= Belgrade Formation =

Geologic formation in North Carolina, United States

- Stratigraphic range: Late Oligocene (Chattian) to Early Miocene (Aquitanian)
- Type: Geological formation
- Sub-units: Pollocksville Member, Haywood Landing Member
- Underlies: Duplin Formation
- Overlies: River Bend Formation

Lithology
- Primary: Limestone sand
- Other: Clay

Location
- Region: North Carolina
- Country: United States

Type section
- Named for: Belgrade, North Carolina

The Belgrade Formation is a limestone geologic formation in North Carolina characterized by limestone coquina mixed with sand, and thinly laminated clays. It preserves fossils dating back to the Paleogene period.

== Description ==
The Belgrade Formation is composed of two subunits: the Pollocksville member and the Haywood Landing member. The Pollocksville member is composed of unconsolidated oyster shells and sand. It was deposited in the Oligocene and early Miocene. The Haywood Landing member is composed of shelly sands and thinly laminated clays. The Belgrade Formation was originally considered part of an Eocene formation called the Trent Marl before it was identified as being deposited in the Miocene and split off.

Strontium isotope dating suggests that the marine invertebrates in the formation primarily originate from an older Late Oligocene-aged facies, while the vertebrates (including the land mammals and sharks) date to a younger, earliest Miocene-aged facies.

== Fossil content ==
=== Mammals ===
A small but diverse land mammal fauna is known from the formation.

==== Rodents ====
Genus	Species	Presence	Material	Notes	Images
cf. Palaeocastor	cf. P. sp.	Jones County		A castorid.	

==== Lagomorphs ====
Genus	Species	Presence	Material	Notes	Images
cf. Megalagus	cf. M. sp.	Jones County		A leporid.	

==== Carnivorans ====
Carnivorans
Genus	Species	Presence	Material	Notes	Images
Amphictis	A. cf. timucua	Jones County.	A right mandible (NCSM 33670).	An ailurid.	
Craterogale	C. cf. simus	Jones County		A mustelid.	

==== Perissodactyls ====
Perissodactyls
Genus	Species	Presence	Material	Notes	Images
cf. Anchitherium	cf. A. sp.			An equid.	
Archaeohippus	A. blackbergi			An equid.	
cf. Menoceras	cf. M. barbouri			A rhinoceros.	
Nexuotapirus	N. marslandensis			A tapir.	

==== Artiodactyls ====
Artiodactyls
Genus	Species	Presence	Material	Notes	Images
Arretotherium	A. cf. fricki			An anthracotheriid.	
Daeodon	D. shoshonensis			An entelodont.	
Hesperhyinae indet.				A peccary of uncertain affinities.	
Paratoceras	P. wardi			A protoceratid.	

===== Cetaceans =====
Cetaceans
Genus	Species	Presence	Material	Notes	Images
Albertocetus	A. meffordorum		Isolated right petrosal (USNM 559392).	A xenorophid.	
Ankylorhiza	A. tiedemani		CCNHM 6045 (a well preserved 10th lower postcanine).	An odontocete.	
Ankylorhiza	A. sp.		CCNHM 5554 (an isolated postcanine) and CCNHM 5465 (a partial bulla).	An odontocete.	
Cotylocara	cf. C. sp.		CCNHM 4277 (a partial left bulla)".	A xenorophid.	
Echovenator	E. sp.		A fragmentary petrosal.	A xenorophid.	
Echovenator	cf. E.		Partial tympanic bullae.	A xenorophid, possibly the same taxon as Echovenator sp.	
Eomysticetidae	Eomysticetidae indet.		CCNHM 1831 and CCNHM 1821, both are right tympanic bullae.	An indeterminate species most similar to (but sti differing from) Eomysticetus whitmorei.	
cf. Eoplatanista	cf. E. sp.		"CCNHM 4276 (a partial right tympanic bulla)".		
Eurhinodelphinidae	Eurhinodelphinidae indet.		CCNHM 1828 (a partial right periotic) and CCNHM 4274 (a partial left tympanic bulla).	"Compares favorably with Xiphiacetus cristatus and Eurhinodelphis cocheteuxi".	
?Kentriodontidae	?Kentriodontidae indet.		"CCNHM 4275 (a partial bulla)".		
Odontocete	Indeterminate	Belgrade Quarry.	CCNHM 1903 (an isolated tooth).	Indeterminate toothed whale remains, may represent a squalodelphinid or kentriodontid.	
cf. Physeteroidea	cf. Physeteroidea indet.		"CCNHM 1904 (a partial tooth)".	May represent a juvenile physeteroid tooth.	
Squalodelphinidae	Squalodelphinidae indet.		3 right periotics and 3 right tympanic bullae.		
cf. Squalodon	cf. S. sp.		A periotic and multiple teeth.	A squalodontid.	
Waipatiidae	Waipatiidae indet.		"CCNHM 1354 (a posterior lower molar)".		
Xenorophidae	Xenorophidae indet.		"CCNHM 1833 (a partial right squamosal)".	"Falls within the size range of Albertocetus, Echovenator, and Inermorostrum."	
Xenorophus	X. sp.		CCNHM 1826 (a partial postcanine) and CCNHM 1187 (a partial tympanic bulla).	A xenorophid, may represent X. sloanii.	

==== Sirenians ====
Sirenians
Genus	Species	Presence	Material	Notes	Images
Crenatosiren	C. olseni	Onslow Beach.	Skull caps.	An early dugongid.	
Sirenia	Sirenia indet.		"CCNHM 1906 (a partial rib fragment)".	"Approximately twice the diameter of ribs of Crenatosiren olseni, potentially representing a larger dugongid like Dioplotherium, Stegosiren, or Priscosiren".	

=== Reptiles ===
Reptiles
Genus	Species	Presence	Material	Notes	Images
Chelonioidea		Belgrade Quarry.		Indeterminate sea turtle remains.	
Crocodilia		Belgrade Quarry.		Indeterminate crocodilian remains.	

=== Fish ===
Color key: Taxon / Reclassified taxon / Taxon falsely reported as present / Dubious taxon or junior synonym / Ichnotaxon / Ootaxon / Morphotaxon	Notes; Uncertain or tentative taxa are in small text; ~~crossed out~~ taxa are discredited.

Chondrichthyes
Genus	Species	Presence	Material	Notes	Images
Anoxypristis	A. sp.	Belgrade Quarry.		A sawfish.	
Carcharhinus		Belgrade Quarry.			
Carcharias	C. sp.	Belgrade Quarry.		A sand shark.	
Carcharocles	C. angustidens	Belgrade Quarry.		A megatooth shark, now reassigned to the genus Otodus.	
Galeocerdo	G. casei or mayumbensis	Belgrade Quarry.		A tiger shark.	
Ginglymostoma	G. delfortriei			A nurse shark.	
Hemipristis	H. serra	Belgrade Quarry.		A snaggletooth shark.	
Myliobatis	M. sp.	Belgrade Quarry.		An eagle ray.	
Nebrius or Ginglymostoma		Belgrade Quarry.		A nurse shark.	
Negaprion		Belgrade Quarry.		A lemon shark.	
Notorynchus	N. primigenius	Belgrade Quarry.		A cow shark.	
Odontaspis	O. sp.	Belgrade Quarry.		A sand shark.	
Otodus	O. angustidens	Belgrade Quarry.		A megatooth shark.	
Plinthicus	P. stenodon	Belgrade Quarry.		An extinct ray.	
Physogaleus	P. aduncas	Belgrade Quarry.		A ground shark.	
Rhinoptera	R. sp.	Belgrade Quarry.		A cownose ray.	
Squatina	S. sp.	Belgrade Quarry.		An angelshark.	

Osteichthyes
Genus	Species	Presence	Material	Notes	Images
Lagodon	L. sp.	Belgrade Quarry.		A pinfish.	

=== Invertebrates ===
Molluscs
Genus	Species	Presence	Material	Notes	Images
Crassostrea	C. gigantissima	Upper finer grained unit, Pollocksville Member.		An oyster.	

== See also ==
- List of fossiliferous stratigraphic units in North Carolina
