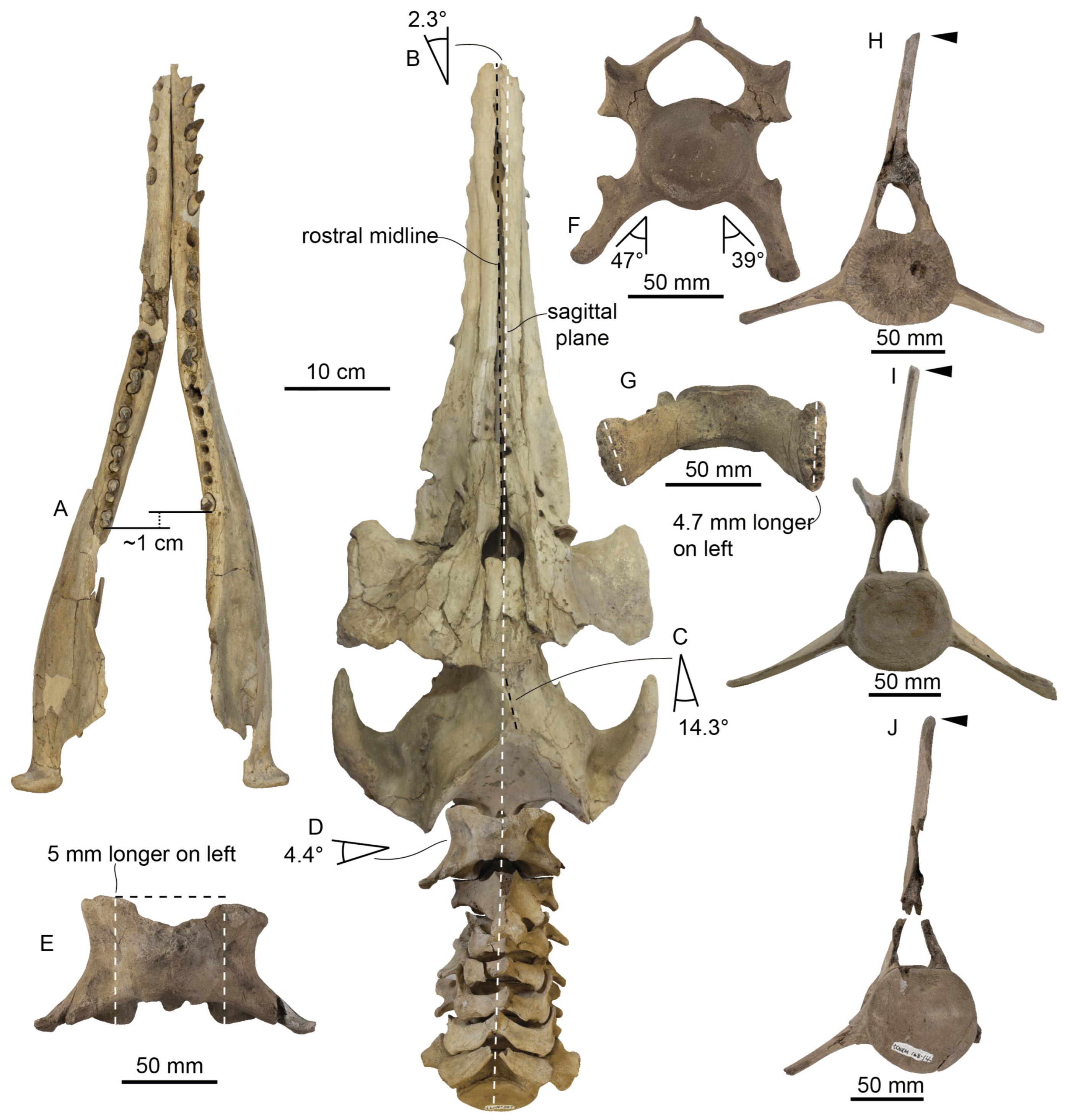
- Skull of Xenorophus sloanii

Scientific classification
- Kingdom: Animalia
- Phylum: Chordata
- Class: Mammalia
- Infraclass: Placentalia
- Order: Artiodactyla
- Infraorder: Cetacea
- Parvorder: Odontoceti
- Family: †Xenorophidae; Uhen, 2008

Genera
- Albertocetus; Archaeodelphis; Cotylocara; Echovenator; Inermorostrum; Mirocetus; Xenorophus

= Xenorophidae =

Xenorophidae Temporal range: 30–23.03 Ma Oligocene

Extinct family of mammals

Xenorophidae is an extinct family of dolphin-like odontocetes (toothed whales) that lived in the Southeastern United States during the Oligocene. They were among the first major groups of odontocetes to diversify in the fossil record and are notable for their ability to echolocate.

== Description ==
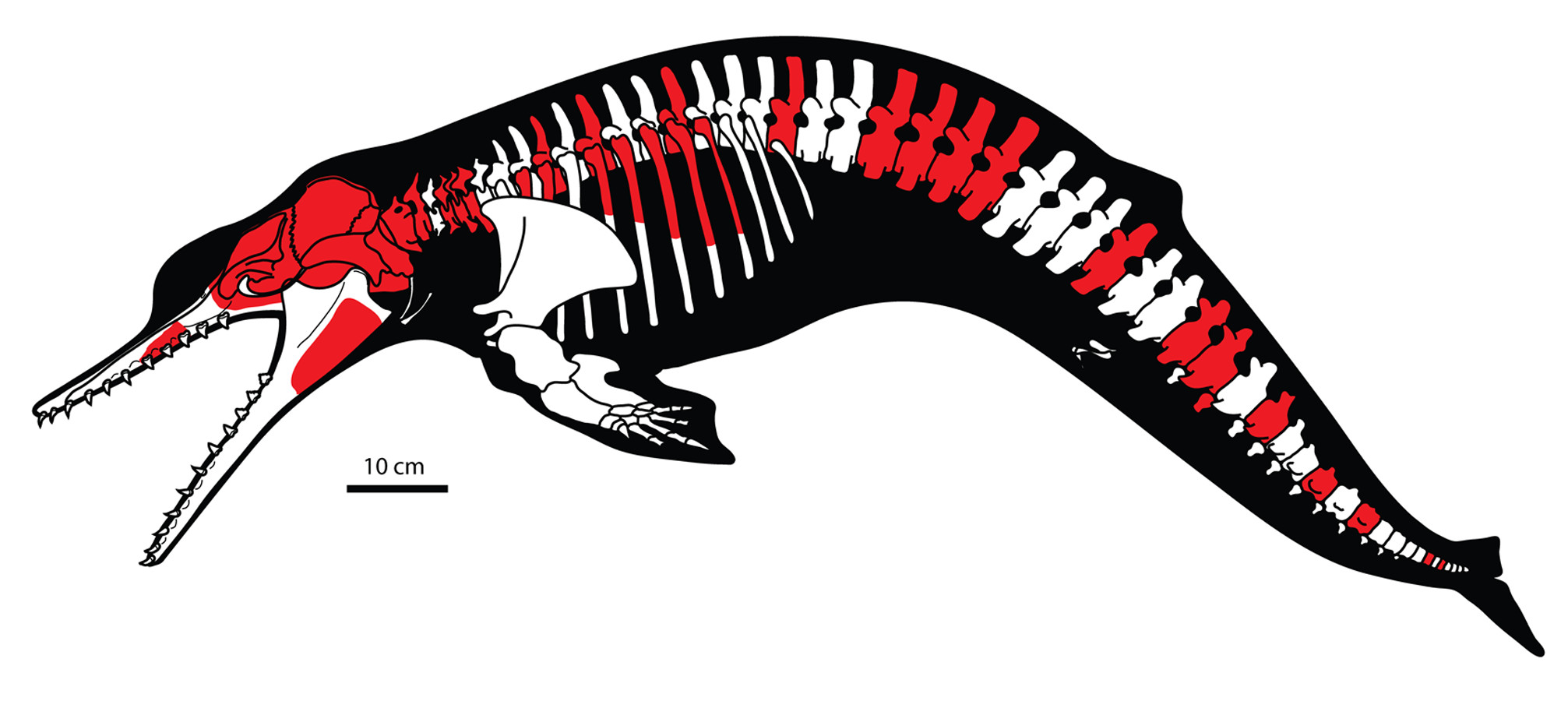
Albertocetus reconstruction outline, showing known bones in red. From Boessenecker et al. 2017

Xenorophids would have appeared quite dolphin-like, with a streamlined body, a tail fluke, and likely possessing flipper-like forelimbs. They were all relatively small compared to modern whales, ranging in size from the 1.2-meter-long (3.9 ft) Inermorostrum xenops to the three-meter-long (9.8 ft) Xenorophus sloanii.

Their elongated skulls lacked the fusion in the sutures between their premaxilla, maxilla, and nasal bones seen in more derived odontocetes. These skulls, with the exception of Inermorostrum, possessed heterodont dentition, with larger conical teeth in the front and sharp, slashing teeth in the back; however, their teeth were still small for Oligocene odontocetes.

=== Locomotion ===
Xenorophids would have swum using dorsoventral undulation like that seen in modern dolphins. However, they lacked the stiffening in the vertebrae present in more derived odontocetes, meaning they were slower and less efficient compared to modern dolphins. Though less efficient, this design enabled for agile maneuvering in confined habitats such as reefs.

=== Echolocation ===
Xenorophids seem to have evolved echolocation independently from modern odontocetes. Genera such as Cotylocara and Echovenator possess traits in their skull clearly showing that they were capable of echolocation. These include having nasal bones that are elevated far above the rostrum, being a precursor to the melon-like structure seen in modern echolocating odontocetes. In addition, they also possessed modified periotic bone and nasal plug morphology showing that they were capable of hearing high-frequency sounds underwater.

== Classification ==
Xenorophidae is one of the earliest diverging branches of the odontocete family tree, being sort of a link between earlier basilosaurid-type whales to more derived odontocetes.

The cladogram below shows the phylogenetic analysis of Velez-Juarbe, 2023 describing the basal odontocete Olympicetus thalassodon, with clade names from Boessenecker and Geisler, 2023.

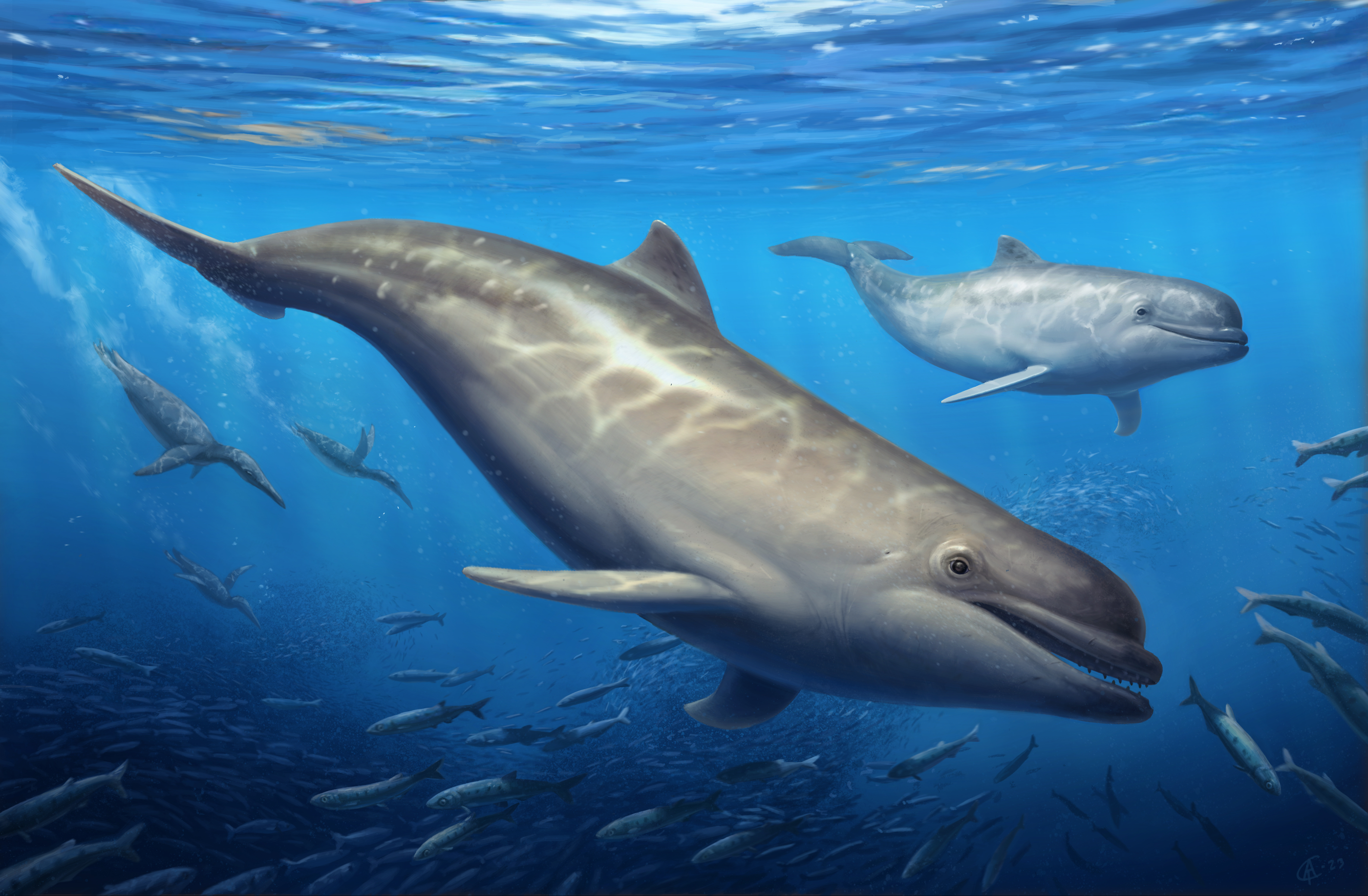
Life reconstruction of Olympicetus thalassodon, another early diverging odontocete

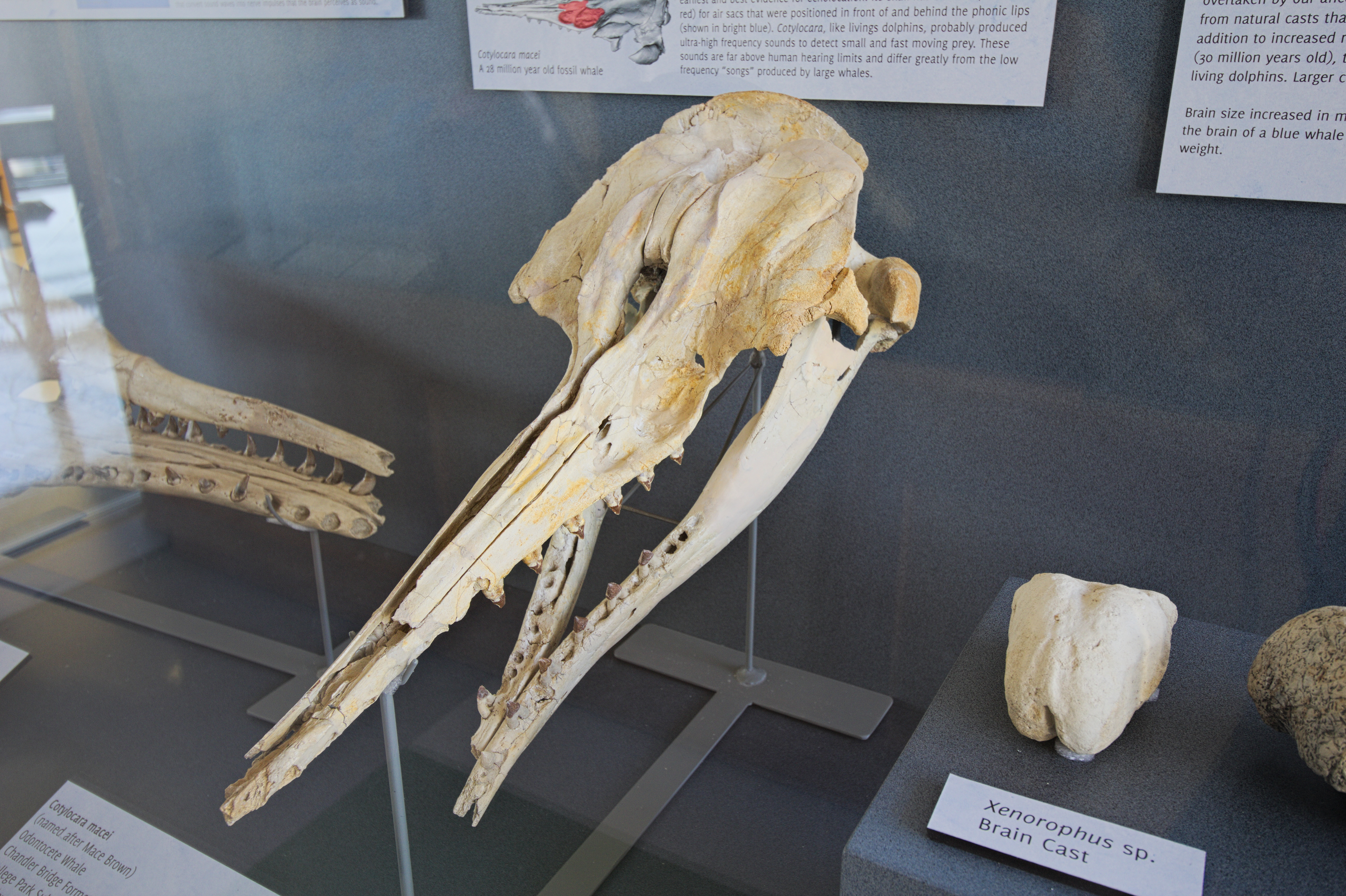
Cotylocara skull at Mace Brown Museum of Natural History

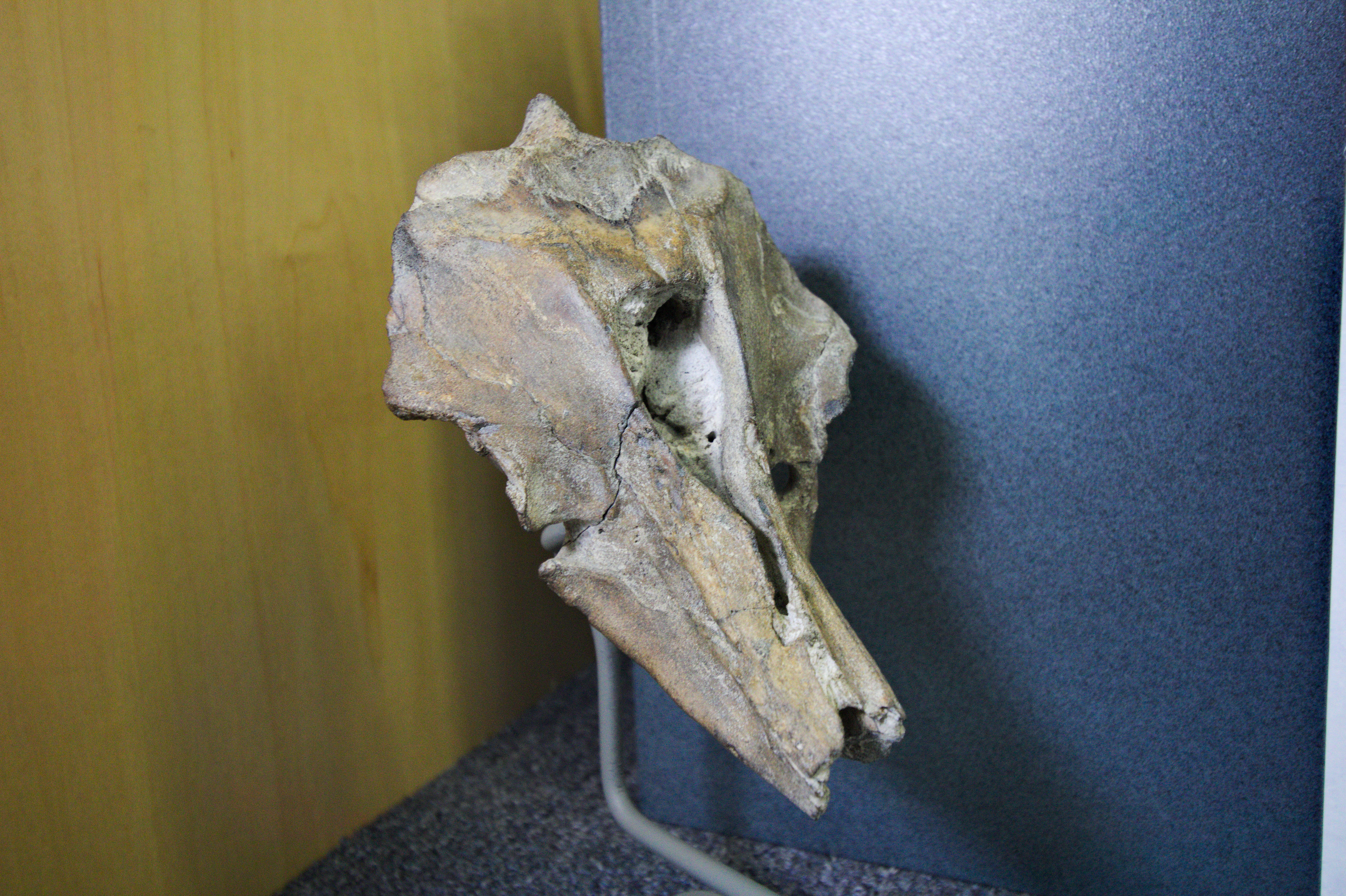
Inermorostrum skull at Mace Brown Museum of Natural History

- Odontoceti
  - Xenorophidae
    - Ashleycetus planicapitis
    - - Archaeodelphis patrius
      - - Mirocetus riabinini
        - - - Xenorophus sp.
            - Xenorophus sloanii
          - - Albertocetus meffordorum
            - - Inermorostrum xenops
              - - Cotylocara macei
                - Echovenator sandersi
  - Amblyoccipita
    - Simocetidae
      - Simocetus rayi
      - - CCNHM 1000
        - - Simocetidae Gen. et sp. A
          - - Olympicetus sp. 1
            - - Olympicetus avitus
              - Olympicetus thalassodon
    - Stegoceti
      - Patriocetus kazakhstanicus
      - - - Agorophius pygmaeus
          - Ankylorhiza tiedemani
        - - Papahu taitapu
          - - Waipatia maerewhenua
            - - - Otekaikea marplesi
                - - Otekaikea huata
                  - Prosqualodon davidi
              - - Ediscetus osbornei
                - - - Squalodon calvertensis
                    - Squaloziphius emlongi
                  - - - Phoberodon arctirostris
                      - - - Notocetus vanbenedeni
                          - - Eurhinodelphis bossi
                            - - Zarhachis flagellator
                              - Zarhinocetus errabundus
                        - Crown Odontoceti

== Ecology ==
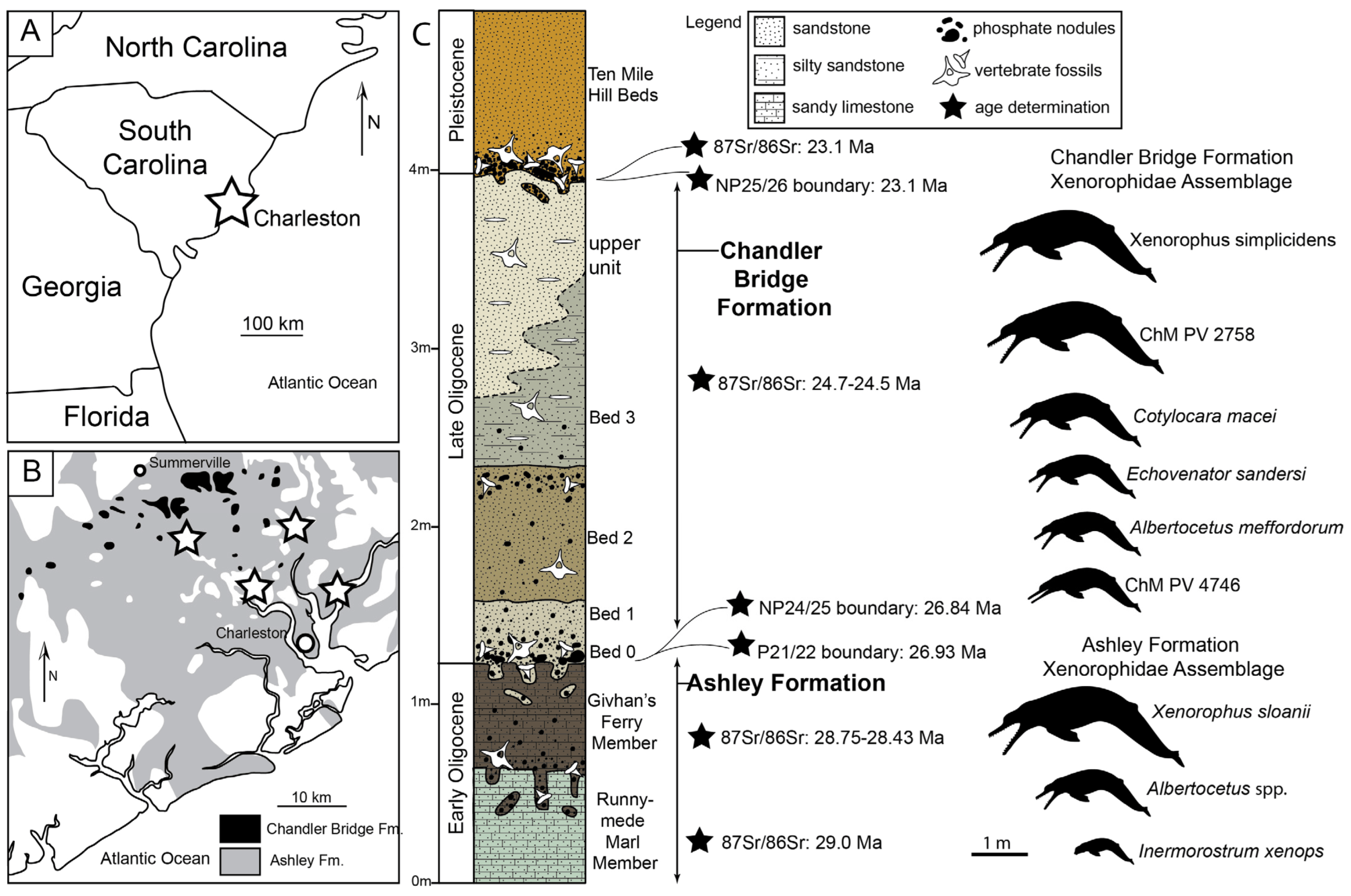
Xenorophid diversity from the Chandler Bridge and Ashley Formations

Xenorophids occupied the niche of mid-level predators within their shallow marine ecosystems. They are thought to have been quite dolphin-like in life and mainly preyed upon small-to-medium-sized aquatic prey. These environments preserve fossils showing that they were abundant in fish, sharks, and many species of both early toothed and early baleen whales.

Xenorophid fossils are only known from the Southeast United States, being mostly found around the Charleston Embayment and absent from other well-sampled areas. This group is also relatively short-lived, only living for about 7 million years during the Oligocene. This both suggests that this family was an rapid and endemic radiation when odontocetes as a whole was first starting to diversify. Additionally, many xenorophid species coexisted with one another, suggesting a degree of niche partitioning among them.

=== Diet and feeding ===
Members of Xenorophidae were quite diverse in terms of their ecology. Ashleycetus represents a generalist predator, possessing a wide snout and closely spaced teeth. Other genera such as Albertocetus, Cotylocara, and Echovenator used their senory capabilities in echolocation to catch prey with their longirostrine jaws. Inermorostrum is unusual for possessing toothless jaws, suggesting it was a suction feeder of small soft-bodied prey like squid, benthic invertebrates, and fish.

Tooth wear patterns on different specimens of Xenorophus show that their diet was varied. Two other specimens also preserved missing teeth, suggesting that they were hunting large, risky prey or fighting one another.

=== Social behavior ===
It has been hypothesized that the high degree of sensory abilities and advanced cognitive traits of Albertocetus, due to its elevated encephalization, suggest it may have engaged in complex social behaviors like group hunting and schooling.
