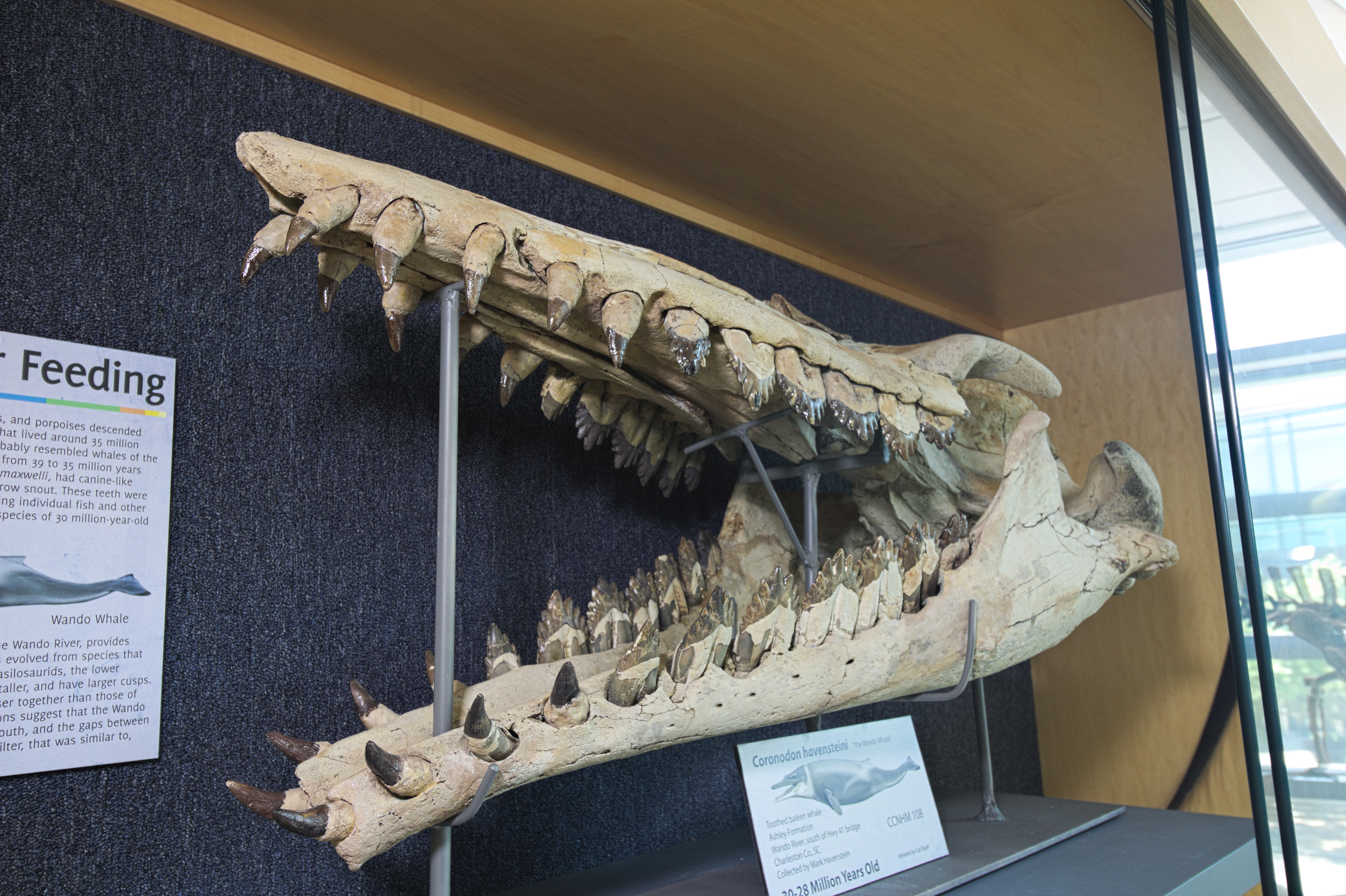
- Coronodon anterolateral at Mace Brown Museum of Natural History

Scientific classification
- Kingdom: Animalia
- Phylum: Chordata
- Class: Mammalia
- Order: Artiodactyla
- Infraorder: Cetacea
- Parvorder: Mysticeti
- Genus: †Coronodon; Geisler et al., 2017

Type species
- Coronodon havensteini Geisler et al., 2017

Other species
- †C. newtonorum Boessenecker et al., 2023; †C. planifrons Boessenecker et al., 2023

= Coronodon =

Coronodon Temporal range: Oligocene ~(Rupelian-Chattian), ~30–23.5 Ma

Extinct genus of whales

Coronodon (meaning "crown tooth") is a genus of toothed (transitional) baleen whales from the Early Oligocene Ashley and Chandler Bridge Formations of South Carolina. The genus contains three species: the type species C. havensteini, and the additional species C. newtonorum and C. planifrons.

== Description ==
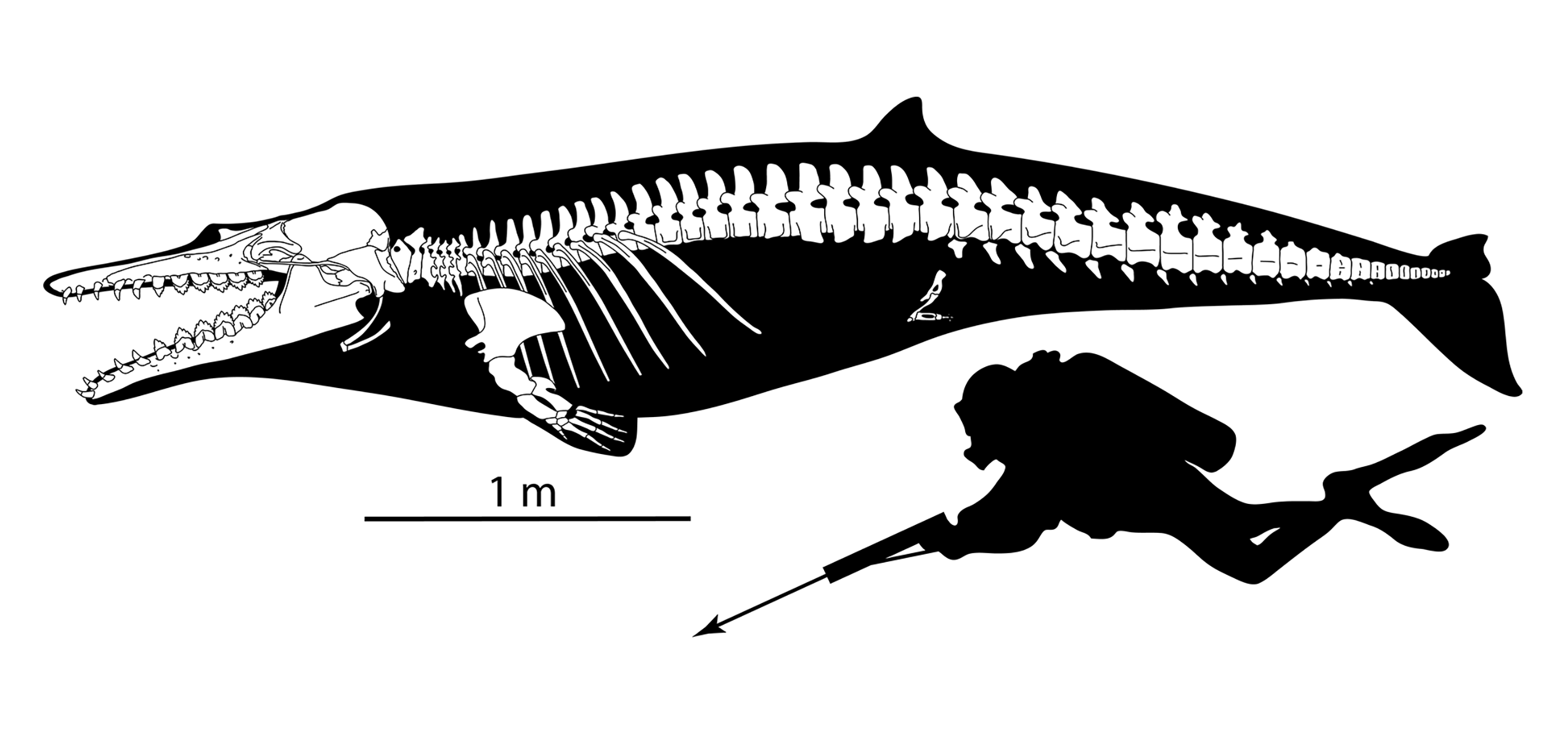
Skeletal composite and size of Coronodon compared to a scuba diver

It was about the same size as Dorudon, measuring 4.9 m (16 ft) long and weighing 1,150 kg (2,540 lb). The rostrum of Coronodon is wide, judging by its straight sides and short mandibular symphysis. Despite being similar to some archaeocetes in having a rostrum that is twisted counterclockwise in anterior view, it differs in having posterior teeth with subequal cusps and an upturned anterior process of the maxilla. Coronodon differs from other toothed mysticetes in having anterior lower molars labially overlapping posterior lower molars.

== Classification ==
Coronodon falls basally within Mysticeti, being closely related to the unnamed taxon ChM PV 5720 and more primitive than "Metasqualodon" symmetricus, Aetiocetidae, Mammalodontidae and Llanocetus.

== Paleobiology ==
=== Palaeoecology ===
Coronodon is very unusual among archaic toothed mysticetes due to its dentition. The incisors are caniniform, and the wear patterns on both the incisors and the P2 (second premolar on the right side of the mandible) indicate that this whale was well suited to capturing larger prey items and piercing flesh. This sort of dentition is common in basilosaurid whales, who fed utilizing exclusively pursuit predation. However, Coronodon differs from its ancestors in that the molars possess more cusps and are more tightly packed together. The molars also have reduced support from the alveolar bone, and the apices of the three main cusps on the molars and premolars meet one another at a 155° angle in the upper and lower jaws, opposed to an 82° and a 98° angle in Cynthiacetus and Dorudon respectively. This would have diminished the shearing capabilities of the molars. The lack of oral processing occurring in the molar region is further evident by wear patterns on the labial side of the teeth, but little to no wear close to the cutting surfaces. This is unlike the molar teeth of basilosaurids, which possess wear patterns indicative of shearing flesh at the back of the mouth. In its initial description, Coronodon was implied to have used its unusual postcanine teeth to facilitate dental filtration. Apart from the unusual shape and orientation of the teeth, evidence of dental filtration can be found in its skull. The rostrum in Coronodon is much wider than those of archaeocetes and primitive odontocetes, and the mandibular symphysis is shorter. Additionally, the rostrum has very loose sutures, which would have allowed Coronodon to expand the size of its oral cavity in a manner similar to extant mysticetes. Together, these features suggest that Coronodon employed a mixed feeding strategy, swapping from pursuit predation to ram feeding when necessary, and using its enlarged molar teeth as a sieve to capture prey when filter feeding.

However, other studies have suggested that Coronodon was primarily, if not obligately, a raptorial feeder, pointing to the correlation in Coronodon between wear in tooth notches with wear on neighboring cusps and the higher degree of wear present in mesial teeth, mesial cusps, higher cusps, and maxillary teeth compared to other regions of individual teeth and its wider dentition as evidence.

== Paleoenvironment ==
C. havensteini is found in the Ashley Formation, whereas C. planifrons and C. newtonorum are found in the Chandler Bridge Formation. The genus has a fossil range from 30 to 23.5 million years ago, from the Early to Late Oligocene. These formations would have been underwater at this time, and a wide assemblage of marine vertebrates have been discovered there. Many primitive odontocetes, such as Ankylorhiza, Xenorophus, and Albertocetus have been found in both formations in Oligocene aged deposits. Other fossil organisms that have been found in these formations include various sea turtles, sirenians, primitive mysticetes, the giant bird Pelagornis and bony and cartilaginous fishes of many sorts, including the megatoothed shark genus Otodus.
