= Ashley Formation =

Geologic formation in South Carolina, U.S.

- Stratigraphic range: Lower Oligocene (Rupelian)
- Type: Geological formation
- Sub-units: Gettysville Member, Runnymeade Marl Member and Givhans Ferry Member.

Location
- Region: South Carolina
- Country: United States

The Ashley Formation is a geologic formation in South Carolina. It preserves fossils dating back to the Paleogene period.

== Vertebrate fauna ==
=== Mammals ===
Carnivorans
Genus	Species	Presence	Material	Notes	Images
Phocidae	Gen. et. sp. indeterminate		Proximal portion of a right femur (ChM PV5713).	"A taxon closely comparable to the most specialized phocid, the modern genus Cystophora".	

Cetaceans
Genus	Species	Presence	Material	Notes	Images
Agorophius	A. pygmaeus	Underwater cliff face from the base of the formation.	A skull.		
Albertocetus	A. meffordorum	Givhans Ferry Member and Runnymede Marl Member.	A partial skeleton and an isolated braincase.	A xenorophid.	
Ankylorhiza	A. tiedemani; A. serratidens		AMNH 10445 (partial rostrum), CCNHM 103 (partial skeleton) and CCNHM 220 (partial skull and associated vertebrae).; CCNHM 105 (partial skeleton)	An odontocete.	
Ashleycetus	A. planicapitis	Near Charleston, South Carolina.	A partial skull.		
Coronodon	C. havensteini	"Wando River near Highway 41 Bridge, Berkeley County, South Carolina".		A basal mysticete.	
Ediscetus	E. osbornei			"Slightly outside the odontocete crown group".	
Micromysticetus	M. rothauseni		2 braincases without rostra.		
Saurocetus	S. gibbesi		A cheek tooth (MCZ 8760).		
Xenorophus	X. sloanii		Incomplete skull.	A xenorophid.	

Sirenians
Genus	Species	Presence	Material	Notes	Images
Crenatosiren	C. olseni			A dugongid also found in the Chandler Bridge and Parachucla formations.	
Stegosiren	S. macei			A dugongid also found in the Chandler Bridge Formation.	

=== Reptiles ===
Color key: Taxon / Reclassified taxon / Taxon falsely reported as present / Dubious taxon or junior synonym / Ichnotaxon / Ootaxon / Morphotaxon

Notes
Uncertain or tentative taxa are in small text
~~crossed out~~ taxa are discredited.

Crocodilians
Genus	Species	Presence	Material	Notes	Images
Gavialosuchus	G. carolinensis	Dorchester County, South Carolina.	ChM PV 4282 (mandible).	Now moved to the genus Thecachampsa.	
Thecachampsa	T. carolinensis	Dorchester County, South Carolina.	ChM PV 4282 (mandible).	A gavialoid.	

Turtles
Genus	Species	Presence	Material	Notes	Images
Ashleychelys	A. palmeri	East bank of Limehouse Branch, Berkeley County, South Carolina.		A cheloniid also found in the Chandler Bridge Formation.	
Carolinochelys	C. wilsoni		MCZ 1005-A (a nearly complete skull) and ChM PV8309.	A cheloniid also found in the Chandler Bridge Formation.	
Natemys	N. sp. 1	Givhan's Ferry Member.	CCNHM 4288 (a non-ridged carapacial ossicle).	A dermochelyid also found in the Chandler Bridge Formation.	
Natemys	N. sp. 2	?Givhan's Ferry Member and ?Runnymede Marl Member.	CCNHM 4287.1 and 4287.2 (a pair of associated non-ridged carapacial ossicles) and CCNHM 4910 (a non-ridged ossicle).	A dermochelyid.	
Procolpochelys	P. charlestonensis		A humerus (MCZ 1005-B).	A cheloniid also found in the Chandler Bridge Formation.	
cf. Psephophorus	cf. P. sp.	Givhan's Ferry Member.	CCNHM 5460 (an isolated non-ridged carapacial ossicle).	A dermochelyid also found in the Chandler Bridge Formation.	

=== Fish ===
==== Cartilaginous fish ====
Rays
Genus	Species	Presence	Material	Notes	Images
Dasyatis	"D." sp.	Givhans Ferry Member.	Multiple teeth.	A stingray.	
Mobula	"M." sp.	Givhans Ferry Member.		A devil ray.	
Plinthicus	P. sp.	Givhans Ferry Member.	A tooth (SC2007.36.48).		
Raja	R. mccollumi	Givhans Ferry Member.	Abundant teeth.	A skate also found in the Chandler Bridge Formation.	
Raja	"R." sp.	Givhans Ferry Member.	Multiple teeth.	A skate, appears to be conspecific with R. sp. from the Chandler Bridge Formation.	
Rhinoptera	"R." sp.	Givhans Ferry Member.	A broken symphyseal tooth (SC2015.29.30).	A cownose ray.	
Rhynchobatus	R. sp.	Givhans Ferry Member.	Teeth (SC2007.36.39, SC2015.29.13, SC2015.29.32).	A wedgefish.	
Taeniurops	"T." cavernosus	Givhans Ferry Member.	Multiple teeth.	A stingray.	

Sharks
Genus	Species	Presence	Material	Notes	Images
Araloselachus	A. sp.	May be derived from the Givhans Ferry Member.	Teeth.		
Carcharhinus	C. gibbesi	Givhans Ferry Member.	A large number of teeth.	The most common shark in the Ashley Formation sample.	
Galeocerdo	G. aduncus	Givhans Ferry Member.	Teeth.	A ground shark.	
Ginglymostomatidae	Gen. et. sp. indeterminate	Givhans Ferry Member.	A partial tooth (SC2007.36.208).	A nurse shark.	
Hemipristis	H. cf. H. serra	Givhans Ferry Member.	4 teeth (SC2007.36.7, SC2007.36.8, SC2007.36.9).	A weasel shark.	
Otodus	O. angustidens	Ashley River, in the Givhans Ferry Member.	Ablated specimens.	A megatoothed shark.	
Pachyscyllium	P. sp.	Givhans Ferry Member.	A tooth (SC2007.36.5).	A catshark.	
Physogaleus	P. cf. P. contortus	Givhans Ferry Member.	SC2007.36.19, SC2007.36.20 (four teeth), SC2015.29.27.	A ground shark.	
Physogaleus	P. sp.	Givhans Ferry Member.	SC2007.36.21 and SC2007.36.22.	A ground shark.	
Pristiophorus	P. sp.	Givhans Ferry Member.	An incomplete tooth crown (SC2015.29.20).	A sawshark.	
Scyliorhinus	S. weemsi	Givhans Ferry Member.	Multiple teeth.	A catshark.	
Sphyrnidae	Gen. et. sp. indeterminate	Givhans Ferry Member.	SC2007.36.23, SC2007.36.24, SC2007.36.25 (11 teeth), SC2007.36.26, SC2007.36.27, SC2007.36.28 (five teeth).	A hammerhead shark.	
Squalus	S. sp.	Givhans Ferry Member.	Teeth.	A spurdog.	
Squatina	S. sp.	Givhans Ferry Member.	Teeth (SC2007.36.4, SC2007.36.126, SC2007.36.149, SC2007.36.227, SC2015.29.18, SC2015.29.19, SC2015.33.2).	An angelshark.	
Trigonotodus	T. alteri		Teeth.	A thresher shark.	

==== Bony fish ====
Bony fish
Genus	Species	Presence	Material	Notes	Images
Albula	A. sp.	Givhans Ferry Member.	SC2007.36.165, SC2007.36.228 (five teeth), SC2015.29.200 (66 teeth), SC2015.29.201, SC2015.29.204.	A bonefish.	
Archosargus	A. sp.	Givhans Ferry Member.	Multiple teeth.	A sea bream.	
?Calamus	?C. sp.	Givhans Ferry Member.	Teeth.	A sea bream.	
Diplodus	D. sp.	Givhans Ferry Member.	SC2015.29.195 (13 teeth), SC2015.29.222, SC2015.29.223, SC2015.29.224.	A sea bream.	
?Labridae	Gen. et. sp. indet.	Givhans Ferry Member.	Multiple teeth.	A wrasse.	
Osteoglossidae	Gen. et. sp. indeterminate	Givhans Ferry Member.	Teeth.		
Palaeocybium	P. sp.	Givhans Ferry Member.	A tooth (SC2007.36.122), a neurocranium and a left dentary.	A scombrid.	
Paralichthyidae	Gen. et. sp. indeterminate	Givhans Ferry Member.	A tooth (SC2015.36.259).	A flatfish.	
?Pogonias	?P. sp.	Givhans Ferry Member.	Teeth.	A croaker.	
Scomberomorus	S. sp.	Givhans Ferry Member.	Teeth.	A scombrid.	
?Sciaenops	?S. sp.	Givhans Ferry Member.	Many teeth.	A croaker.	
Sphyraena	S. sp.	Givhans Ferry Member.	Many cheek and laniary teeth.	A barracuda.	
Trichiurides	T. cf. T. sagittidens	Givhans Ferry Member.	2 ablated laniary teeth.	A cutlassfish.	

== See also ==
- List of fossiliferous stratigraphic units in South Carolina
- Paleontology in South Carolina
