= Chandler Bridge Formation =

Geologic formation in South Carolina, US

- Stratigraphic range: Chattian (Arikareean); ~27–24 Ma
- Type: Formation
- Unit of: Cooper Group
- Underlies: Edisto Formation
- Overlies: Ashley Formation

Lithology
- Primary: Sandstone

Location
- Coordinates: 32.8°N 79.8°W
- Approximate paleocoordinates: 32.9°N 74.2°W
- Region: South Carolina
- Country: United States

Type section
- Named for: Chandler Bridge
- Chandler Bridge Formation (the United States) Chandler Bridge Formation (South Carolina)

The Chandler Bridge Formation is a geologic formation in South Carolina. It preserves fossils dating back to the Chattian (Late Oligocene) of the Paleogene period, corresponding to the Arikareean in the NALMA classification. The formation overlies the Ashley Formation and is overlain by the Edisto Formation.

== Vertebrate paleofauna ==
=== Mammals ===
==== Carnivorans ====
Carnivorans reported from the Chandler Bridge Formation
| Genus | Species | Presence | Material | Notes | Images |
|---|---|---|---|---|---|
| Phocidae | Gen. et. sp. indeterminate | | Proximal portion of a right femur (ChM PV5712). | "A taxon closely comparable to the most specialized phocid, the modern genus Cystophora". | |

==== Cetaceans ====
Cetaceans reported from the Chandler Bridge Formation
| Genus | Species | Presence | Material | Notes | Images |
|---|---|---|---|---|---|
| Agorophiidae | | Upper sandy unit. | | Referred to as Genus Y. | |
| Agorophius | A. sp. | | "ChM PV 4256 (a partial skull and mandible with isolated teeth and associated postcrania)". | An odontocete. | |
| Ankylorhiza | A. tiedemani | | Partial skeleton (CCNHM 103). | An odontocete also found in the Ashley and Belgrade formations. | |
| Coronodon | C. newtonorum | A manmade exposure in the vicinity of North Charleston, South Carolina. | Partial skeleton (ChM PV 2778). | A toothed mysticete. | |
| Coronodon | C. planifrons | Drainage ditch in North Charleston, South Carolina. | Partial skeleton (CCNHM 166) & isolated upper right M3 (CCNHM 8732). | A toothed mysticete. | |
| Cotylocara | C. macei | | | A xenorophid. | |
| Echovenator | E. sandersi | "Drainage ditch associated with Limehouse Branch Creek, Berkeley County, South Carolina". | A nearly-complete skull. | A xenorophid. | |
| Eomysticetus | E. carolinensis | Bed 2. | | A mysticete. | |
| Eomysticetus | E whitmorei | Bed 3, uppermost portion of the formation. | | A mysticete. | |
| cf. Eurhinodelphinidae | | Upper sandy unit. | | | |
| cf. Squalodelphinidae | | Upper sandy unit. | | | |
| Squalodon | | | A premolar (BCGM 9198). | | |

==== Sirenians ====
Sirenians reported from the Chandler Bridge Formation
| Genus | Species | Presence | Material | Notes | Images |
|---|---|---|---|---|---|
| Crenatosiren | C. olseni | | | A dugongid also known from the Ashley and Parachucla formations. | |
| Metaxytherium | M. albifontanum | | Remains of a subadult individual (SC 89.115) and a young adult individual (ChM PV4757). | A dugongid also found in the Parachucla Formation. | |
| Priscosiren | P. atlantica | | SC 89.254. | A dugongid. | |
| Stegosiren | S. macei | | | A dugongid also found in the Ashley Formation. | |

=== Reptiles ===
==== Birds ====
| Color key: Taxon / Reclassified taxon / Taxon falsely reported as present / Dubious taxon or junior synonym / Ichnotaxon / Ootaxon / Morphotaxon | Notes; Uncertain or tentative taxa are in small text; ~~crossed out~~ taxa are discredited. |

Birds reported from the Chandler Bridge Formation
| Genus | Species | Presence | Material | Notes | Images |
|---|---|---|---|---|---|
| Palaeochenoides | P. mioceanus | | Distal end of a tarsometatarsus. | A dubious pelagornithid, may instead be from the Cooper Formation. | |
| Pelagornis | P. sandersi | Bed 2 near Charleston Airport. | | A pelagornithid. | |
| Sulidae | | Upper sandy unit. | | | |
| Tympanonesiotes | T. wetmorei | | A very fragmentary piece of tarsometatarsus. | A dubious pelagornithid, may instead be from the Cooper Formation. | |

==== Crocodilians ====
Crocodilians reported from the Chandler Bridge Formation
| Genus | Species | Presence | Material | Notes | Images |
|---|---|---|---|---|---|
| Gavialosuchus | G. carolinensis | | A tooth (BCGM 9197). | Now moved to the genus Thecachampsa. | |
| Thecachampsa | T. carolinensis | | A tooth (BCGM 9197). | A gavialid. | |

==== Testudines ====
Testudines reported from the Chandler Bridge Formation
| Genus | Species | Presence | Material | Notes | Images |
|---|---|---|---|---|---|
| Ashleychelys | A. palmeri | | Multiple specimens. | A cheloniid also found in the Ashley Formation. | |
| Bairdemys | B. healeyorum | | A largely complete skeleton and a partial anterior carapace. | A podocnemid. | |
| Carolinochelys | C. wilsoni | Upper sandy unit. | Multiple specimens. | A cheloniid. | |
| cf. Egyptemys | cf. E. sp. | Bed 1. | CCNHM 4289 (a ridged carapacial ossicle). | A dermochelyid. | |
| Natemys | N. sp. 1 | | CCNHM 4405.1–4405.5 (five associated non-ridged carapacial ossicles); CCNHM 5540, 5541, and 5542 (three non-ridged carapacial ossicles). | A dermochelyid, also known from the Ashley Formation. | |
| Procolpochelys | P. charlestonensis | | ChM PV6056 (a largely complete carapace associated with a few fragmentary vertebrae, pectoral girdle elements, humerus, and femur) and a skull fragment. | A cheloniid. | |
| cf. Psephophorus | cf. P. sp. | Bed 1. | CCNHM 5543 (an isolated ridged ossicle). | A dermochelyid, also found in the Ashley Formation. | |

=== Fish ===
==== Bony fish ====
| Color key: Taxon / Reclassified taxon / Taxon falsely reported as present / Dubious taxon or junior synonym / Ichnotaxon / Ootaxon / Morphotaxon | Notes; Uncertain or tentative taxa are in small text; ~~crossed out~~ taxa are discredited. |

Bony Fish reported from the Chandler Bridge Formation
| Genus | Species | Presence | Material | Notes | Images |
|---|---|---|---|---|---|
| Aglyptorhynchus | A. sp. | | 2 isolated vertebral centra. | | |
| Cylindracanthus | C. sp. | Upper sandy unit. | | A billfish. | |
| Histiophorus | H. rotundus | | ChM PV4864. | A swordfish, now reassigned to Xiphiorhynchus. | |
| Xiphiorhynchus | X. cf. X. aegyptiacus | "McKewn Subdivision, North Charleston, Dorchester County, South Carolina". | A partial rostrum. | A swordfish. | |
| Xiphiorhynchus | X. rotundus | | ChM PV4864. | A swordfish. | |

==== Rays ====
Rays reported from the Chandler Bridge Formation
| Genus | Species | Presence | Material | Notes | Images |
|---|---|---|---|---|---|
| Anoxypristis | | | A single rostral spine. | A sawfish. | |
| Dasyatidae | Dasyatidae gen. et. sp. indet. | | Teeth (BCGM 9100 and 9101, SC 2009.18.19). | A stingray. | |
| Dasyatis | D. cavernosa | | Teeth (BCGM 9096, 9097, and 9103, SC 2009.18.17). | A stingray. | |
| Dasyatis | D. rugosa | | BCGM 9098 and 9099, SC 2009.18.18. | A stingray. | |
| Gymnura | G. sp. | | A tooth (BCGM 9107). | A butterfly ray. | |
| Mobula | M. cf. M. loupianensis | | BCGM 9133–9142, SC 2009.18.20. | | |
| Myliobatinae | Myliobatinae gen. indet. | | Partial medial teeth and complete lateral teeth (BCGM 9114–9117, SC 2009.18.22). | An eagle ray. | |
| Paramobula | P. fragilis | | Teeth (BCGM 9111–9113, SC 2009.18.21). | | |
| Plinthicus | P. stenodon | Upper sandy unit. | BCGM 9118–9121, SC 2009.18.23 | The oldest record of this species. | |
| Raja | Raja mccollumi | "Summerville, Dorchester County, South Carolina". | Teeth. | A skate also found in the Ashley Formation. | |
| Raja | R. sp. | | Teeth (BCGM 9087–9089, SC 2009.18.16). | A skate with teeth twice as large as those of R. mccollumi, but far less common. | |
| Rhinoptera | R. cf. R. studeri | | Teeth (BCGM 9122 and 9123, SC 2009.18.24). | A cownose ray. | |
| Rhinoptera | R. sp. | Upper sandy unit. | | A cownose ray. | |
| Rhynchobatus | R. pristinus | | Teeth (BCGM 9084–9086, SC 2009.18.14). | A wedgefish. | |

==== Sharks ====
Sharks reported from the Chandler Bridge Formation
| Genus | Species | Presence | Material | Notes | Images |
|---|---|---|---|---|---|
| Alopias | A. cf. A. vulpinus | | Teeth (BCGM 9046–9048, SC 2009.18.3). | A thresher shark. | |
| Bythaelurus | B. sp. | | A fragmentary tooth (BCGM 9074). | A catshark. | |
| Carcharias | C. cuspidatus | | Teeth (BCGM 9051 and 9052). | A sand shark. | |
| Carcharias | C. sp. | | A posterior tooth (BCGM 9053) and a lateral tooth from a very young individual (BCGM 9054). | A sand shark. | |
| Carcharhinus | C. gibbesi | | BCGM 9056–9062, SC 2009.18.6. | The most abundant non-batoid elasmobranch in the Chandler Bridge sample. | |
| Carcharhinus | C. leucas | Upper sandy unit. | | The bull shark. | |
| Carcharocles | C. angustidens | Upper sandy unit. | Teeth. | Reassigned to the genus Otodus. | |
| Carcharocles | C. sp. | | Teeth (BCGM 9055, SC 2009.18.5). | Reassigned to the genus Otodus. | |
| Cetorhinus | ?C. parvus | | Scales (BCGM 9049 and 9050, SC 2009.18.4). | A basking shark. | |
| Galeocerdo | G. 'casei' | Upper sandy unit. | | | |
| Galeorhinus | G. sp. | | Teeth (BCGM 9080–9083, SC 2009.18.13). | A houndshark. | |
| Hemipristis | H. serra | | Teeth (BCGM 9071–9073, SC 2009.18.10). | A weasel shark. | |
| Nebrius | N. cf. N. serra | | A tooth (SC 2009.18.1). | A nurse shark. | |
| Otodus | O. angustidens | Upper sandy unit. | Teeth. | Assemblages dominated by teeth of juveniles and neonates, with few adults present, suggesting a nursery area for the species. | |
| Otodus | O. sp. | | Teeth (BCGM 9055, SC 2009.18.5). | A megatooth shark. | |
| Physogaleus | P. aduncus | | Teeth (BCGM 9063–9066, SC 2009.18.7). | A ground shark. | |
| Physogaleus | P. contortus | Upper sandy unit. | | A ground shark. | |
| Physogaleus | P. sp. | | Broken and/or abraded teeth (BCGM 9067 and 9068, SC 2009.18.8). | A ground shark. | |
| Rhincodon | R. cf. R. typus | | Teeth (BCGM 9044 and 9045, SC 2009.18.2). | The oldest fossil record of the whale shark. | |
| Rhizoprionodon | R. sp. | | Small, imperfectly preserved teeth (BCGM 9069 and 9070, SC 2009.18.9). | A sharpnose shark. | |
| Sphyrna | S. cf. S. media | | BCGM 9075–9077, SC 2009.18.11. | A hammerhead shark. | |
| Sphyrna | S. zygaena | | BCGM 9078 and 9079, SC 2009.18.12. | The more common of the two hammerhead shark species found in the formation. | |
| Squatina | S. cf. S. angeloides | | BCGM 9042 and 9043. | An angelshark. | |

== See also ==
- List of fossiliferous stratigraphic units in South Carolina
- Paleontology in South Carolina
