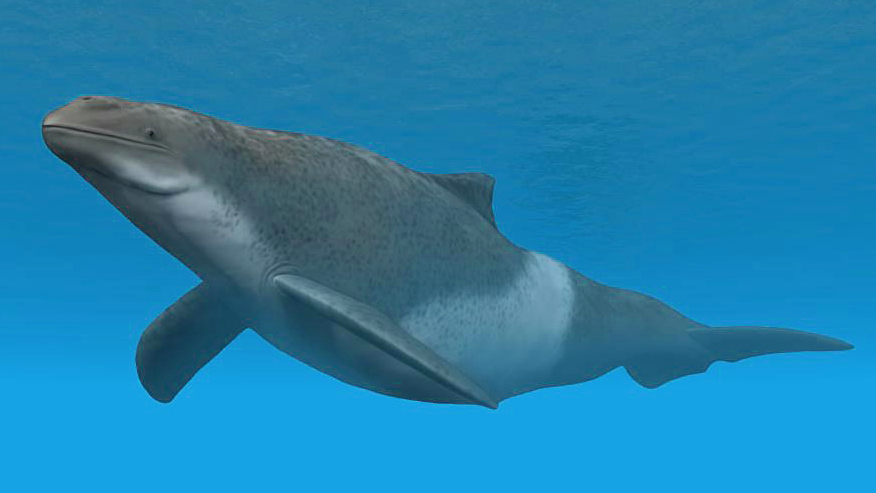
- Life restoration

Scientific classification
- Kingdom: Animalia
- Phylum: Chordata
- Class: Mammalia
- Order: Artiodactyla
- Infraorder: Cetacea
- Family: †Xenorophidae
- Genus: †Mirocetus; Mchedlidze, 1970
- Species: †M. riabinini

Binomial name
- †Mirocetus riabinini Mchedlidze, 1970

= Mirocetus =

Mirocetus Temporal range: Late Oligocene, 28.4–23.0 Ma

Extinct genus of whale-like animals

Mirocetus is a genus of archaic odontocete from the late Oligocene (Chattian) of Azerbaijan. Like many other primitive odontocetes, its classification has been fluid since its description.

== Classification ==
Mirocetus riabinini is based on a skull from late Oligocene (Chattian) deposits in Azerbaijan. Although originally assigned to Patriocetidae in the original description, Mchelidze later assigned it to the mysticete family Aetiocetidae. Fordyce (1981, 2002) treated Mirocetus as Odontoceti incertae sedis in recognition of its primitiveness, and a 2015 paper recognized the genus as sufficiently distinct from other basal odontocete families to warrant its own family, Mirocetidae. However, a cladistic analysis of Olympicetus by Velez-Juarbe recovers Mirocetus as a member of Xenorophidae, rendering Mirocetidae a synonym of Xenorophidae.
