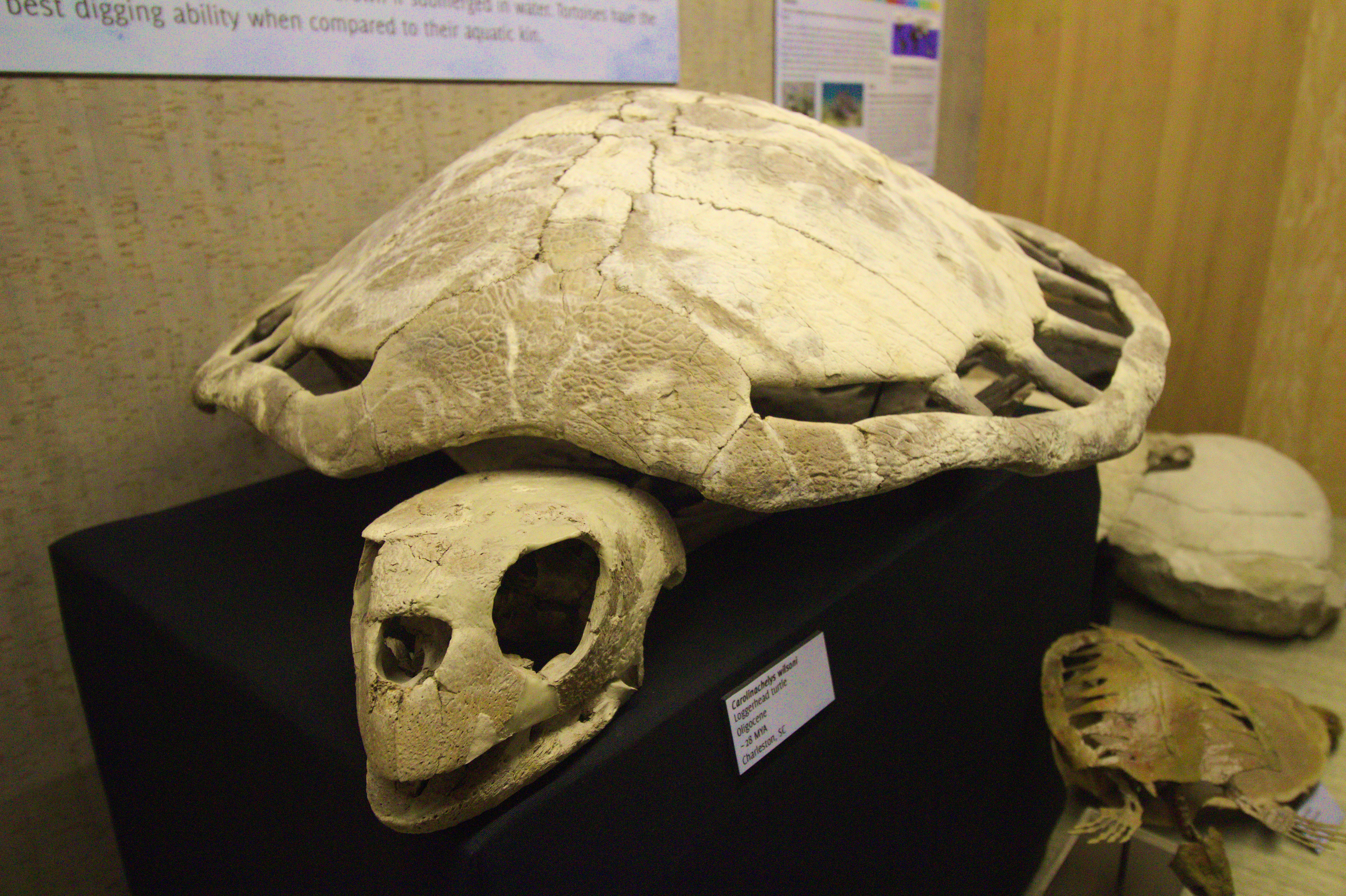
- Carolinachelys wilsoni skull and shell at Mace Brown Museum of Natural History

Scientific classification
- Kingdom: Animalia
- Phylum: Chordata
- Class: Reptilia
- Order: Testudines
- Suborder: Cryptodira
- Family: Cheloniidae
- Genus: †Carolinochelys; Hay, 1923
- Species: †C. wilsoni

Binomial name
- †Carolinochelys wilsoni Hay, 1923

= Carolinochelys =

Carolinochelys Temporal range: Middle Oligocene, 28–23 Ma

Extinct genus of turtles

Carolinochelys is an extinct genus of sea turtle from Oligocene of the eastern United States. It contains one species: C. wilsoni, and was first named by O.P. Hay in 1923. It is known from South Carolina, where it is known from the late Rupelian-aged Ashley Formation and the early Chattian-aged Chandler Bridge Formation, as well as from the late Rupelian-aged Old Church Formation of Virginia.
