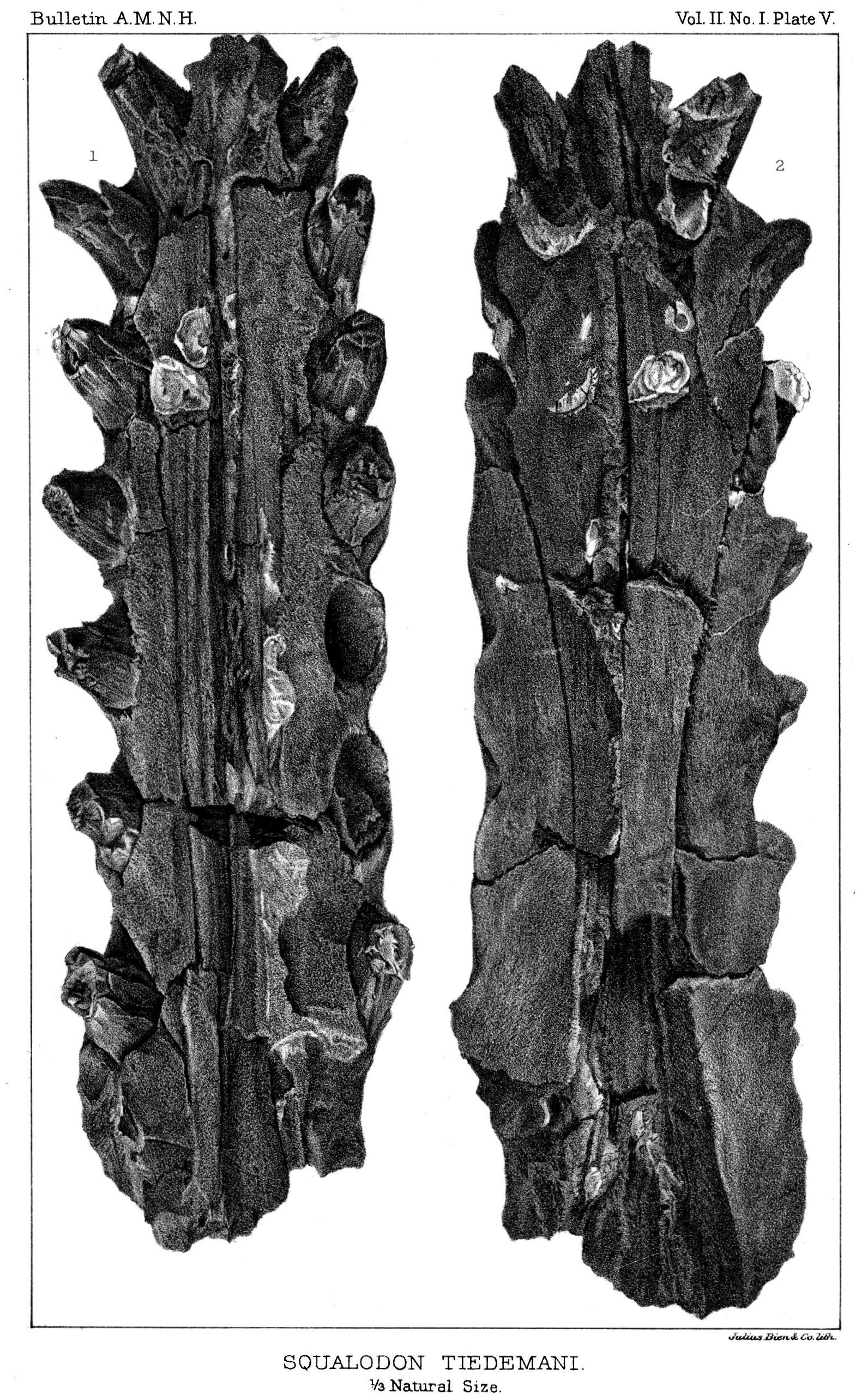
- Holotype rostrum (snout) of A. tiedemani from below and above

Scientific classification
- Kingdom: Animalia
- Phylum: Chordata
- Class: Mammalia
- Order: Artiodactyla
- Infraorder: Cetacea
- Parvorder: Odontoceti
- Genus: †Ankylorhiza; Boessenecker et al., 2020

Type species
- †Squalodon tiedemani Allen, 1887

Species
- †A. tiedemani (Allen, 1887); †A. serratidens Boessenecker, 2026

= Ankylorhiza =

Ankylorhiza Temporal range: Oligocene ~29–23.5 Ma

Extinct genus of toothed whales

Ankylorhiza (meaning "fused roots"; in reference to the type of dentition seen in early toothed whales) is an extinct genus of toothed whale that lived in what is now the United States during the Oligocene epoch, between 29 and 23.5 million years ago. The genus contains two known species, the type species A. tiedemani and the second named species A. serratidens. Ankylorhiza was about 4.8 meters (16 ft) long, with a long, robust skull bearing conical teeth that were angled forwards at the tip of the snout.

Ankylorhiza is the largest known Oligocene toothed whale and is one of the most completely known early members of this group, with characteristics intermediate between basal and derived cetaceans. The taxon would have had powerful jaw musculature and probably fed on large prey by seizing it and puncturing it with its robust teeth. The animal likely occupied a fast-swimming predator niche similar to that of living orcas.

== Discovery and naming ==
The holotype of Ankylorhiza (cataloged under specimen number AMNH 10445) consists of a partial snout fossil discovered in the Ashley Formation of South Carolina, United States. The layers the bones were found in date to the Oligocene epoch of the Paleogene period, between 29 and 23.5 million years ago. In 1887, zoologist Joel Asaph Allen attributed AMNH 10445 to the extinct river dolphin Squalodon—now considered a wastebasket taxon—as a new species he named Squalodon tiedemani. The specific name tiedemani is in honor of I. B. Tiedeman, who discovered the fossils and donated them to the American Museum of Natural History, where they're currently stored.

In a 2020 publication, paleontologist Robert Boessenecker and colleagues found the fossil snout to represent the same taxon as CCNHM 103, a nearly complete skeleton of large toothed whale found in the same formation; and CCNHM 220, a partial skull with associated vertebrae. They reassigned Squalodon tiedemani to as the type species of a new genus genus of toothed whale, Ankylorhiza tiedemani. The generic name Ankylorhiza is Ancient Greek for "fused roots", alluding to the type of dentition exhibited by stem Odontoceti. In 2026, Boessenecker described another incomplete skeleton from the Ashley Formation, accessioned as CCNHM 105, as the holotype of a second species of the genus, A. serratidens.

== Description ==
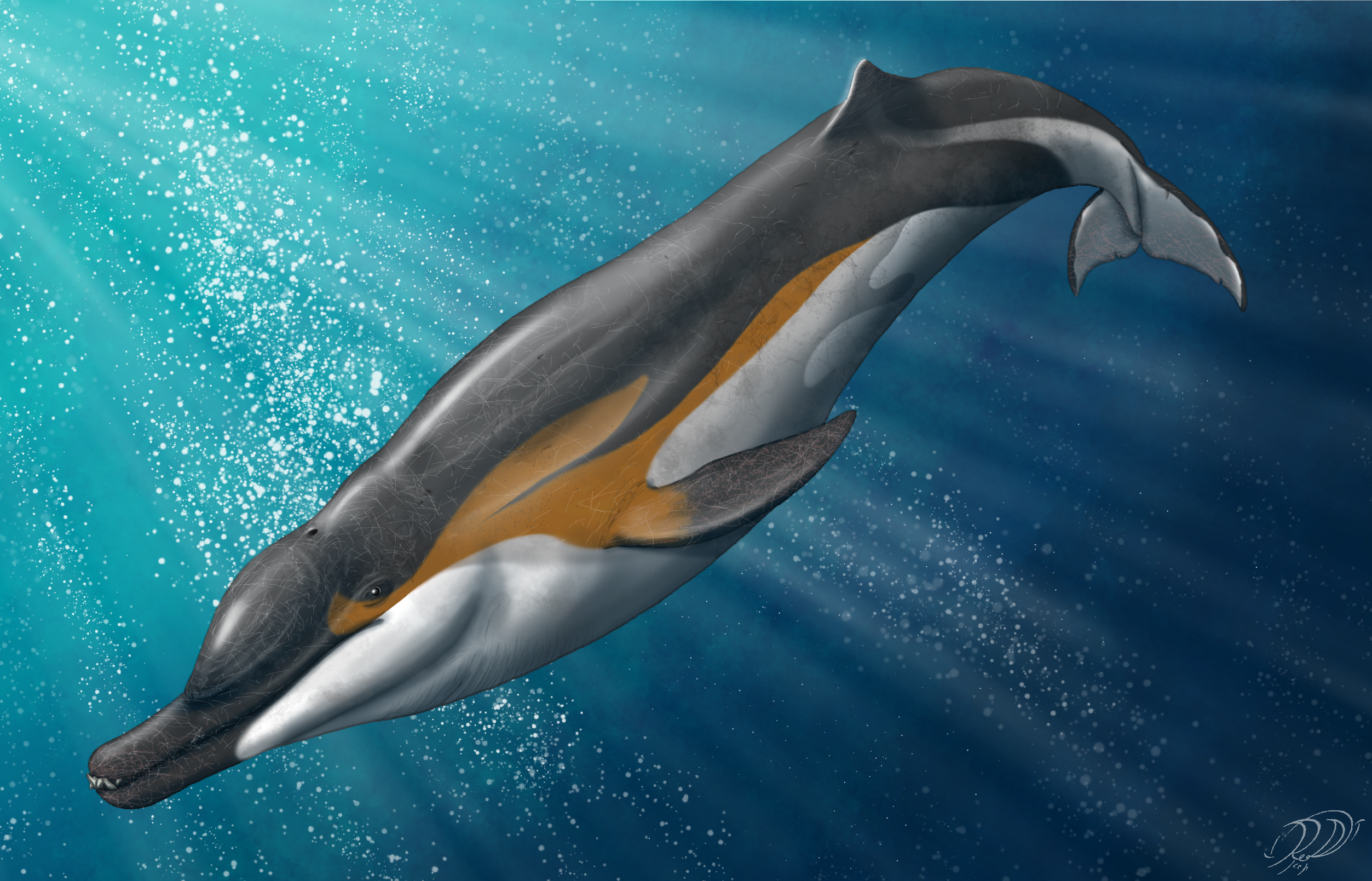
Life restoration of A. tiedemani

Ankylorhiza had a 97.2-centimeter (38.3 in) long skull that measured 42.5 centimeters (16.7 in) at its widest point, and a total body length of around 4.8 meters (16 ft), making it the largest known toothed whale from the Oligocene epoch. In the early Miocene, greater lengths were attained by physeteroids (the ancestral group including modern sperm whales) within this group of whales.

Ankylorhiza's skull was relatively elongated, and had the largest temporal fossae (shallow depressions on the sides of the skull) of any known toothed whale; they composed 24% of the skull's total length and 36% of its width at the rear. Each side of Ankylorhiza's upper jaw bore 13 teeth; three incisors, one canine, and nine postcanines. Between the first canine and the fifth postcanine tooth, the maxilla (main upper jaw bone) became thicker and formed bony supports divided by deep furrows between each tooth, which would have helped the animal's dentition precisely interlock when it closed its jaws. Ankylorhiza's sharp-tipped teeth had carinae (cutting edges) on both edges that bore occasional serrations, and its tooth enamel was adorned with lengthwise ridges. The lower incisors in the upper jaw were tusk-like and angled forwards.

The morphology of Ankylorhiza's forelimbs was between that of basal (early-diverging or "primitive") and living cetaceans. Ankylorhiza's humerus (upper arm bone) had an enlarged head and flattened attachment sites for the ulna and radius (lower arm bones), as well as a shaft that was short relative to those of basilosaurids, but still longer than in extant toothed whales. In comparison to modern toothed whales, the hands and fingers were much longer. In the spinal column, the vertebrae (backbones) at the base of the tail formed a more rigid structure than in earlier cetaceans, while the lumbar region–consisting of vertebrae between the rib cage and pelvis—was very flexible. The height and width of the vertebral centra (bodies of the vertebrae) increase in height from the back of the chest to the basal part of the tail, with the second caudal (tail) vertebra being the tallest and broadest, indicating this region of the body experienced the most undulation when the animal was swimming.

== Classification ==
Ankylorhiza was a member of the toothed whale parvorder Odontoceti. This group contains all cetaceans that feed with teeth, including dolphins, porpoises, beaked whales, sperm whales and others; baleen whales (Mysticeti), in contrast, filter-feed using baleen plates in their mouths. In 2020, Boessenecker and colleagues phylogenetically placed A. tiedemani as a basal odontocete that split off between the xenorophids and squalodontids, in a position between the more basal family Basilosauridae and modern toothed whales. Along with Microcetus, Ankylorhiza is one of the most completely known early toothed whales. Boessenecker and colleagues found A. tiedemani to form a clade with specimens CCNHM 1075 and ChM PV2764, two undescribed Oligocene toothed whale skeletons found in Charleston, both of which may turn out to represent another species within the genus Ankylorhiza. The following cladogram is adapted from the results of Boessenecker and colleagues' analysis in 2020.

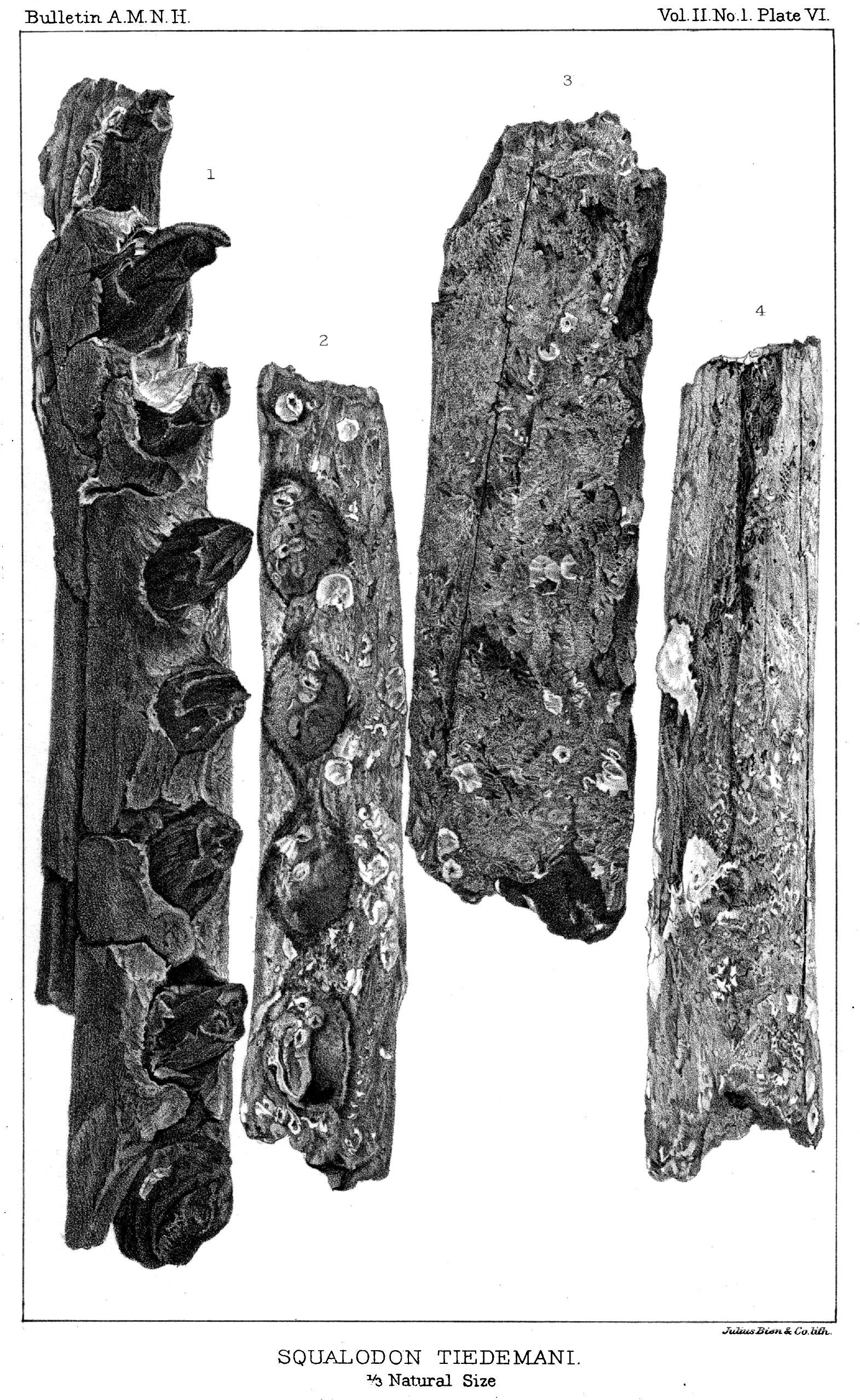
Holotype snout fossil of A. tiedemani in side view (1), and a fragment of the mandibular ramus in various views (2-3)

- Cetacea
  - Georgiacetus vogtlensis
  - - Basilosauridae
    - - Mysticeti
      - Odontoceti
        - Ashleycetus planicapitus
        - - Archaeodelphis patrius
          - - Mirocetus riabinini
            - - Xenorophidae
              - - Patriocetus kazakhstanicus
                - - - ChM PV 2761
                    - - - ChM PV 5852
                        - Agorophius pygmaeus
                      - Ankylorhiza tiedemani
                  - - Otekaikea spp.
                    - - Waipatia maerewhenua
                      - - - Squalodon calvertensis
                          - - Prosqualodon davidis
                            - Phoberodon arctirostris
                        - - - Notocetus vanbenedeni
                            - - Xiphiacetus bossi
                              - Zarhachis flagellator
                          - - Physeteroidea
                            - - - Platanista gangetica
                                - Ziphiidae
                              - - Inioidea
                                - Delphinoidea

== Paleobiology ==
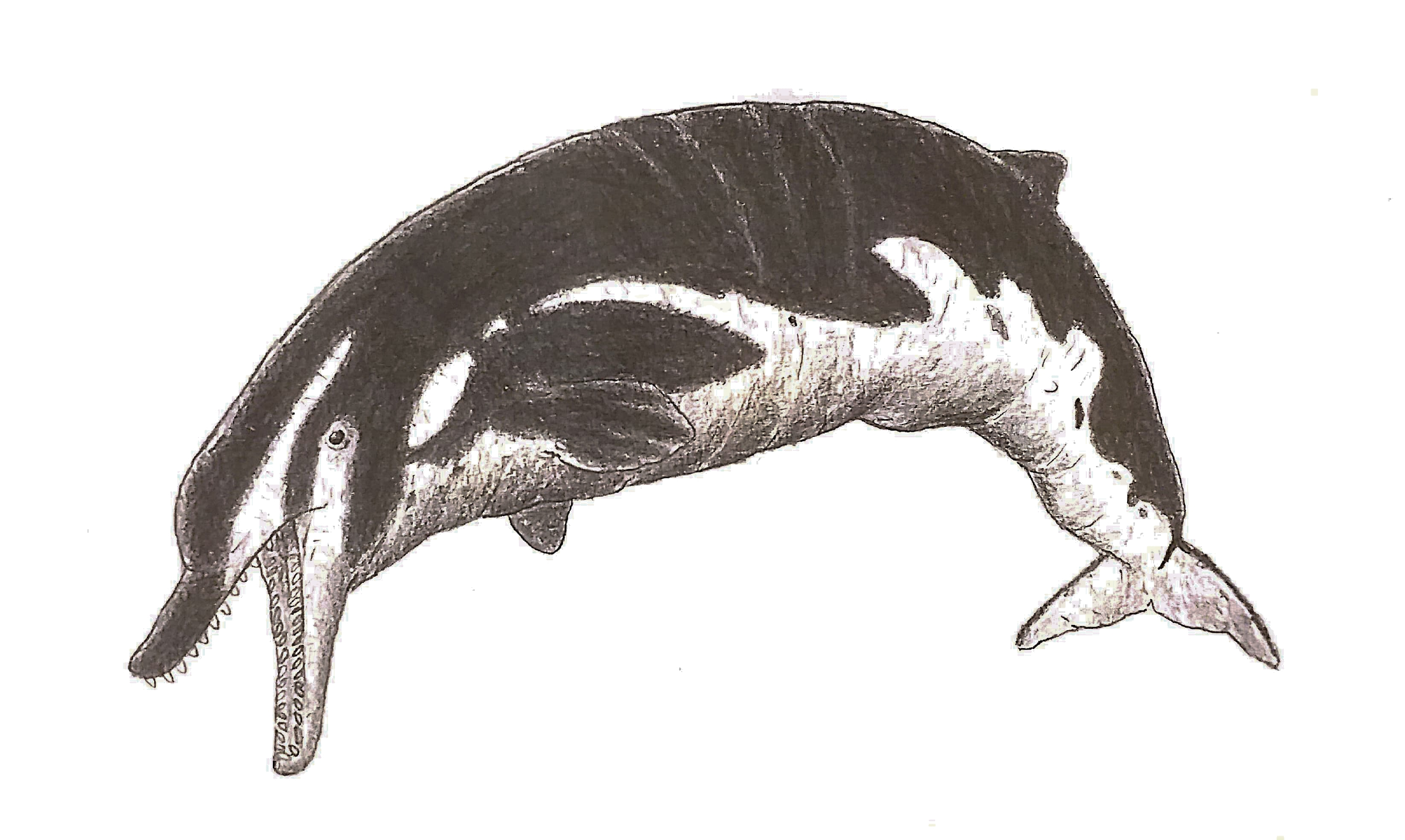
Reconstruction

The jaws were shorter and more well-built than those of earlier toothed whales, indicating an overall stronger snout. The deep and enlarged temporal fossae at the back of the skull would have served to anchor large, powerful jaw muscles; which together with the thick dental cementum indicates Ankylorhiza employed a high bite force for feeding on large prey. This may also explain why the upper jaw became so thick towards the front of the snout for additional reinforcement. Known skull remains of Ankylorhiza often show severe breakage of the postcanine teeth, possibly caused during impacts with solid bone when the animal was feeding. Ankylorhiza's conical teeth with lengthwise ridges suggest they were adapted for seizing and piercing into prey animals. The unique forward-pointing incisors of Ankylorhiza were potentially used for intraspecific combat, though Boessenecker and colleagues note that use for ramming, a method used by living orcas to injure whales, may be more likely.

== Paleoecology ==
The jaw, tooth, and vertebral anatomy of Ankylorhiza, as well as its large body size all indicate that it was a fast-swimming predator, and probably occupied an ecological niche similar to that of modern orcas, thus making it the earliest known large macrophagous toothed whale. After the genus became extinct around the beginning of the early Miocene epoch, its niche was probably reoccupied successively by Squalodon, macroraptorial sperm whales, and extant orcas.
