= Xenorophus =

Xenorophus Temporal range: Late Oligocene, 28.4–23.0 Ma

Scientific classification
- Domain: Eukaryota
- Kingdom: Animalia
- Phylum: Chordata
- Class: Mammalia
- Order: Artiodactyla
- Infraorder: Cetacea
- Family: †Xenorophidae
- Genus: †Xenorophus; Kellogg, 1923

Species
- X. sloanii Kellogg, 1923; X. simplicidens Boessenecker & Geisler, 2023

Extinct genus of mammals

Xenorophus is a genus of primitive odontocete from late Oligocene (Chattian) marine deposits in South Carolina. It belongs to the Xenorophidae.

== Classification ==
Xenorophus was originally described on the basis of a skull from the Chandler Bridge Formation of South Carolina in the collections of the USNM. Later authors, but also Remington Kellogg who described the genus, classified it in the family Agorophiidae, which eventually became a repository for primitive odontocetes. Whitmore and Sanders (1977) and Fordyce (1981), however, preferred to treat Xenorophus as Odontoceti incertae sedis. A cladistic analysis by Mark Uhen published in 2008 recognized Xenorophus as belonging with Archaeodelphis and Albertodelphis in an odontocete clade more primitive than Agorophius or Simocetus, and named it Xenorophidae.

== Paleobiology ==
Xenorophus was capable of echolocation like modern dolphins, judging from the cranial features of two other xenorophids, Echovenator and Cotylocara and from the shape of its own skull. It had an estimated body length of 2.6 to 3 metres (8 ft 6 in to 9 ft 10 in).
