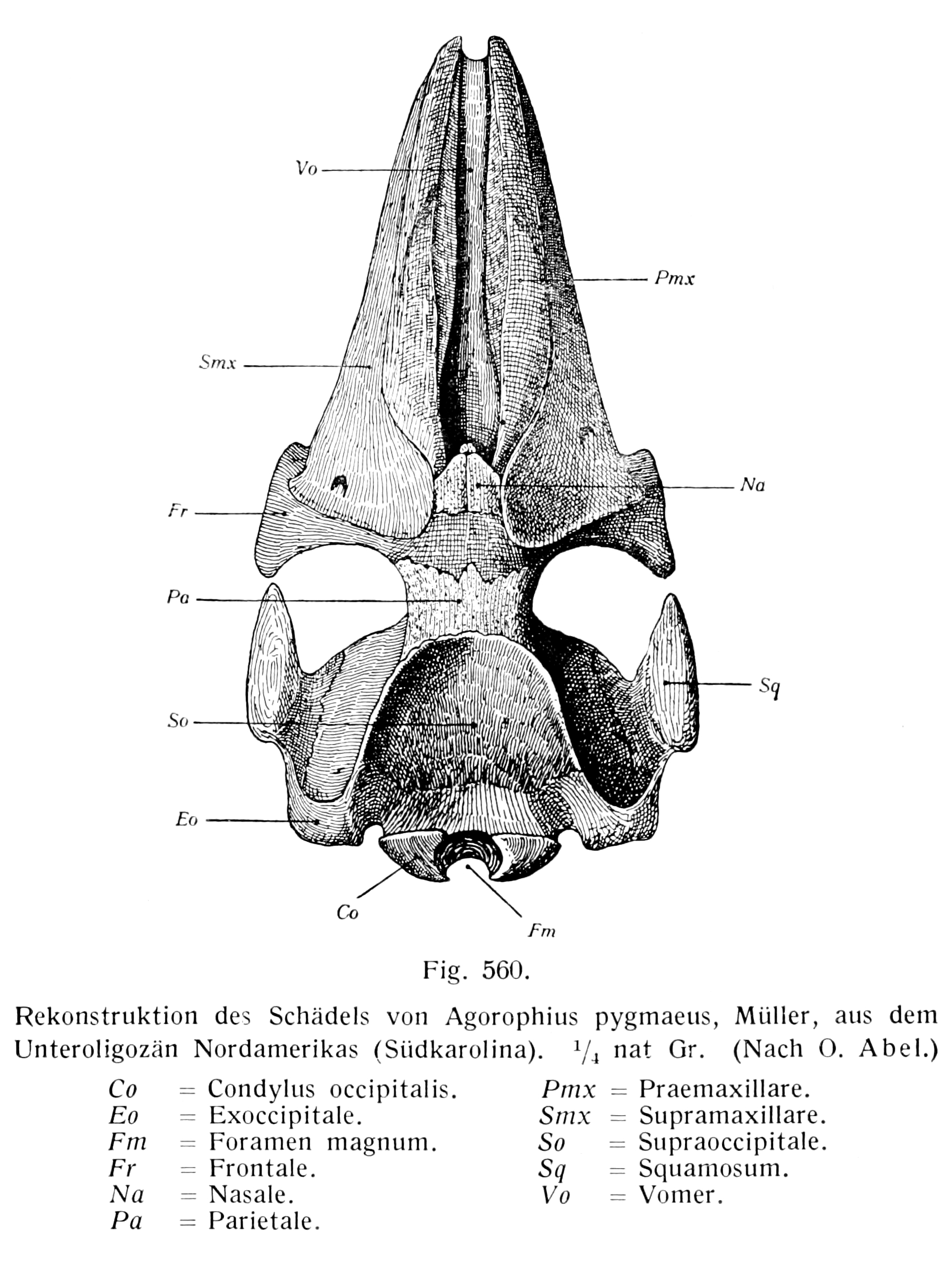

Scientific classification
- Domain: Eukaryota
- Kingdom: Animalia
- Phylum: Chordata
- Class: Mammalia
- Order: Artiodactyla
- Infraorder: Cetacea
- Parvorder: Odontoceti
- Family: †Agorophiidae; Godfrey et al., 2016
- Genus: †Agorophius; Cope, 1895

Type species
- Agorophius pygmaeus J. P. Muller, 1849

= Agorophius =

Agorophius Temporal range: Early Oligocene, 32 Ma

Extinct species of whale

Agorophius is an extinct genus of toothed whale that lived during the Oligocene period, approximately 32 million years ago, in the waters off what is now South Carolina.

== Taxonomy ==
The holotype of Agorophius pygmaeus, MCZ 8761, was first mentioned in an 1848 report on the geology of South Carolina by Michael Tuomey. It was eventually described as Zeuglodon pygmaeus by Johannes Peter Müller in 1849. Louis Agassiz coined the name Phocodon holmesii for the same specimen, classifying it as an odontocete. Later authors considered Zeuglodon pygmaeus a species of either Dorudon or Squalodon, and in 1895 Edward Drinker Cope eventually recognized it as being a distinct genus, which he named Agorophius.

Although the skull is lost and the tooth is the only extant part of MCZ 8761, Fordyce (1981) was able to diagnose Agorophius based on existing descriptions of the skull by Muller, Cope, and Agassiz. New specimens from the Ashley Formation and Chandler Bridge Formation have provided new data on Agorophius, distinguishing it from other Oligocene odontocetes from the US Eastern Seaboard by the condition of its intertemporal condition.

== Classification ==
Agorophius is the type genus of Agorophiidae, named by Abel in 1914. A number of archaic odontocetes (e.g. Archaeodelphis, Microzeuglodon, and Xenorophus) were previously assigned to this family, but are now recognized as belonging to distinct families (Xenorophidae).
