= Chandler Bridge Creek =

Stream in South Carolina, U.S.

Coordinates: 32°57′43″N 80°08′58″W

Chandler Bridge Creek is a stream in Berkeley, Charleston, and Dorchester counties in the U.S. state of South Carolina. It is a tributary of Eagle Creek, which flows into the Ashley River. The late Oligocene (Chattian) Chandler Bridge Formation, which has yielded archaic mysticetes and odontocetes, sirenians, sea birds, and turtles is named after Chandler Bridge Creek.
