= River Bend Formation =

Geologic formation in North Carolina, United States

- Stratigraphic range: Early Oligocene
- Type: Formation
- Underlies: Belgrade Formation
- Overlies: Castle Hayne Limestone

Lithology
- Primary: limestone

Location
- Region: North Carolina
- Country: United States

Type section
- Named for: River Bend Estates along the Trent River

The River Bend Formation is a limestone geologic formation in North Carolina. It preserves fossils dating back to the Paleogene period.

== Description ==
The River Bend formation is a limestone formation characterized by mollusc molds, barnacle hashes, bivalves, and sandy limestone layers. Fossils indicate that the formation was deposited during the middle to late Oligocene.

=== History ===
Originally, the River Bend formation was part of a limestone unit called the Trent Marl. Further research split off the Miocene Belgrade Formation from the Trent Marl and considered the River Bend formation as part of the Castle Hayne Limestone. The River Bend formation was then identified as an Oligocene limestone and broken out from the Castle Hayne Limestone. The Trent Marl nomenclature is no longer used.

== See also ==
- List of fossiliferous stratigraphic units in North Carolina
