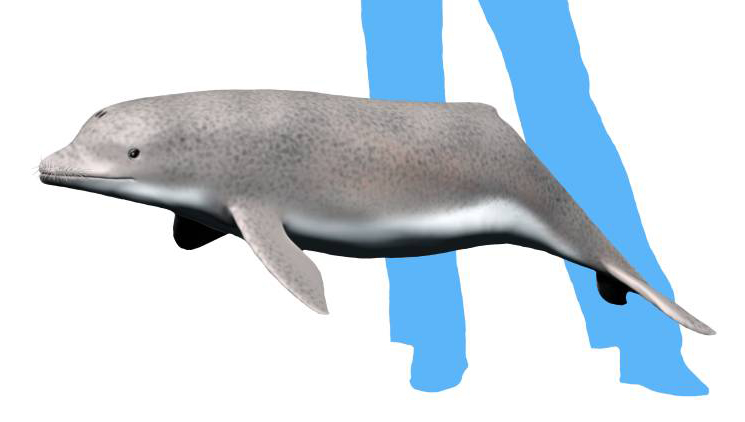
- Life restoration

Scientific classification
- Domain: Eukaryota
- Kingdom: Animalia
- Phylum: Chordata
- Class: Mammalia
- Order: Artiodactyla
- Suborder: Whippomorpha
- Infraorder: Cetacea
- Family: †Xenorophidae
- Genus: †Inermorostrum; Boessenecker et al., 2017
- Species: †I. xenops

Binomial name
- †Inermorostrum xenops Boessenecker et al., 2017

= Inermorostrum =

Inermorostrum Temporal range: Early Oligocene, 30 Ma

Extinct genus of mammals

Inermorostrum is a genus of primitive odontocete from early Oligocene (Rupelian) marine deposits in South Carolina. It belongs to the family Xenorophidae.

== Description and biology ==
Inermorostrum is largely distinguished from other xenorophiids in having a greatly reduced rostrum devoid of functional teeth. The short, toothless rostrum is unusual for early odontocetes, showing that Inermorostrum mostly preyed on squids and other marine invertebrates by means of suction-feeding.

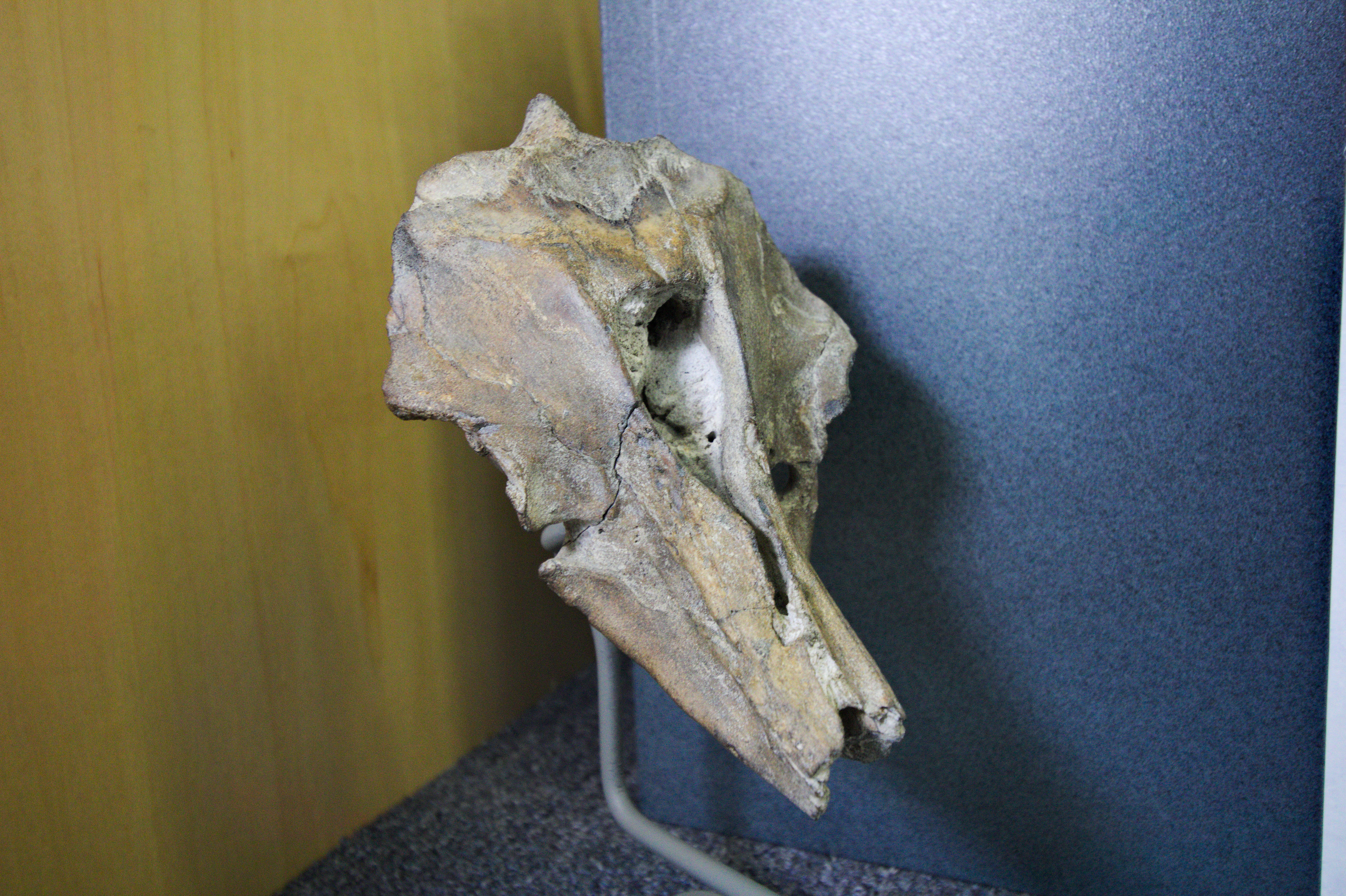
Inermorostrum anterolateral at Mace Brown Museum of Natural History
