= Mace Brown Museum of Natural History =

Natural history museum in South Carolina

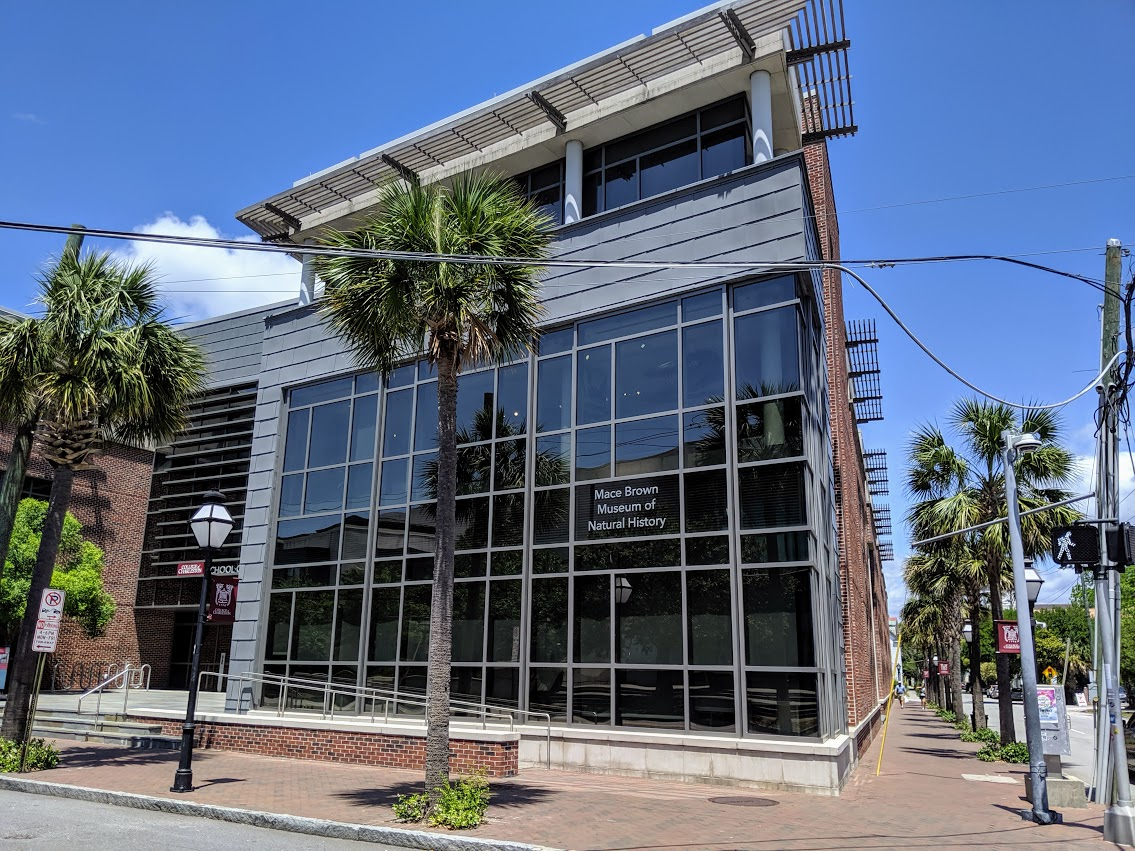
- Mace Brown Museum of Natural History

- Location within South Carolina
- Established: 2010
- Location: 202 Calhoun Street
- Coordinates: 32°47′05.4″N 79°56′22.7″W
- Type: Natural history museum
- Key holdings: Cretaceous-Cenozoic marine vertebrate assemblages including key fossils of early baleen whales, dolphins, and sea cows.
- Collections: Natural history
- Collection size: 30,000
- Visitors: 13,760 in 2019
- Curator: Scott Persons
- Owner: The College of Charleston
- Website: https://charleston.edu/mace-brown-museum/index.php

The Mace Brown Museum of Natural History is a public natural history museum situated on the campus of The College of Charleston, a public liberal arts college in Charleston, South Carolina. With a collection of over 30,000 vertebrate and invertebrate fossils, the museum focuses on the paleontology of the South Carolina Lowcountry. Admission to the museum is free, and donations are welcome. The museum has the holotype specimens of Coronodon, Cotylocara, and Inermorostrum, as well as the reference specimen of Ankylorhiza tiedemani

== History ==
The Mace Brown Museum of Natural History has no relation to the original "College of Charleston Museum" initiated and curated in the mid 19th century by paleontologist Francis Holmes; this earlier museum was closed during the U.S. Civil War.

The original basis for the current museum was a large private collection assembled by Mace Brown, who offered to donate his collection to College of Charleston if a museum were built in the new science building. The College agreed, and space was set aside in the new 125,000 square foot building, which now houses the School of Sciences and Math, which also houses the Department of Chemistry and Department of Geology and Environmental Geosciences. The College of Charleston Natural History Museum was opened in 2010 and subsequently renamed the Mace Brown Museum of Natural History in 2015.

The Mace Brown Museum of Natural History has an informal but extensive partnership with local (and regional) amateur collectors. To celebrate the efforts made by amateur paleontologists, the museum produced an exhibit titled Amateur Contributions to Lowcountry Paleontology. Almost all exhibits have a label or a short description. There is no admission; however, donations are appreciated.

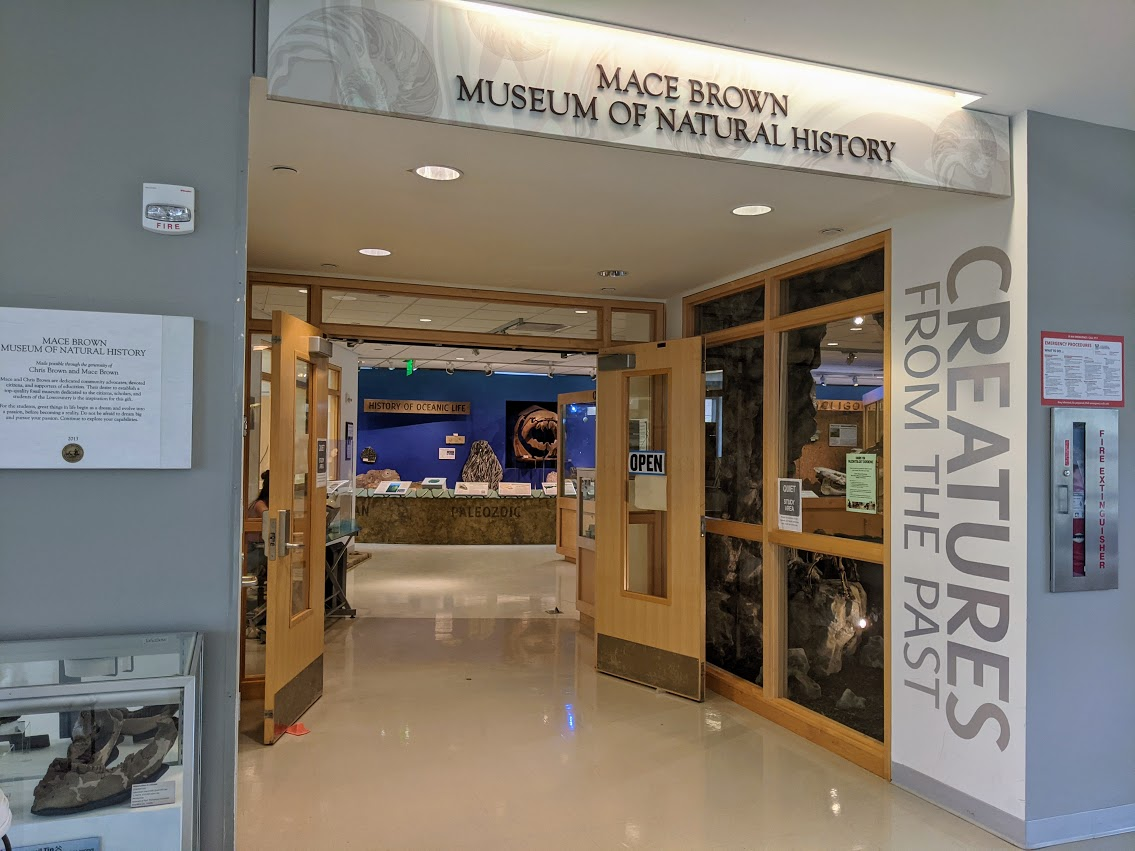
Mace Brown Museum of Natural History inside

== Holdings ==
There are also a few small video presentations, "touch me" specimens, and several fossil whale skulls from the Charleston area. The display is arranged chronologically from oldest (3.45 billion years old) to youngest (a few million years old). The oldest exhibit pieces in the museum are a 3.49 billion-year-old microbial mat.

The 'core' of the museum's collection is a large assemblage of marine vertebrate fossils from the Oligocene epoch (34-23 mya), with an emphasis on unusually well preserved early dolphins and early baleen whales (which are rare worldwide during the Oligocene) but also including sea cows, sea turtles, sea birds, fish, sharks, and rays. An entire exhibit is dedicated to the evolution of cetaceans, emphasizing the evolution of baleen, echolocation, the evolution of the flipper, and telescoping: the migration of the nose into the blowhole onto the top of the head. All four holotype specimens (Cotylocara, Coronodon, Inermorostrum, and Stegosiren) are all from this Oligocene collection.

Remaining parts of the collection and displays include some skulls and skeletons of Pleistocene land mammals from the southeastern USA (chiefly Florida and South Carolina), Cretaceous mosasaurs from the Western Interior Cretaceous Seaway, fossil mammals and turtles from the White River badlands of South Dakota, an exhibit on trackways, an exhibit on fossil mammoths and mastodons, an exhibit on fossil preservation (taphonomy), another on turtles, and another on crinoids and other echinoderms. Exhibits include a fossil plant display, sloths of the southeast, and elephants of South Carolina.

In 2011 the museum added an ocean and sea bottom, with fossils of bottom dwellers mounted on the seafloor. Floaters and swimmers mounted above in the sea. There are two large feature specimens: the head shield of a giant armored placoderm fish and a complete skeleton of a large teleost bony fish.

In 2019, a complete mounted cast skeleton of the ancestral whale Dorudon atrox (Eocene, Egypt) was donated to the museum and installed as a permanent exhibit in the atrium of the Addlestone Library.

In 2020 casts of skulls of a Triceratops and a Tyrannosaurus were added. The Tyrannosaurus is a cast of the T. rex named "Scotty", the largest T. rex ever discovered. The Triceratops and Tyrannosaurus were joined by Tylosaurus.

In April 2021, a new exhibit highlights dinosaur tracks and trackways from around the world. Some of the items in the new exhibit include a Stegosaurus track cast, a large ornithopod track, and ornithopod track paths.

== Research ==
Research using the collections at the museum emphasizes the marine vertebrate paleontology of the Carolinas, particularly the early evolution of whales and dolphins. Undergraduate College of Charleston students have the opportunity to conduct research projects on fossils from the collection, focusing thus far on fossil fish, sharks, sea turtles, and cetaceans.

In 2021, student Camille Sullivan received the museum's first Paleontology Scholarship.
