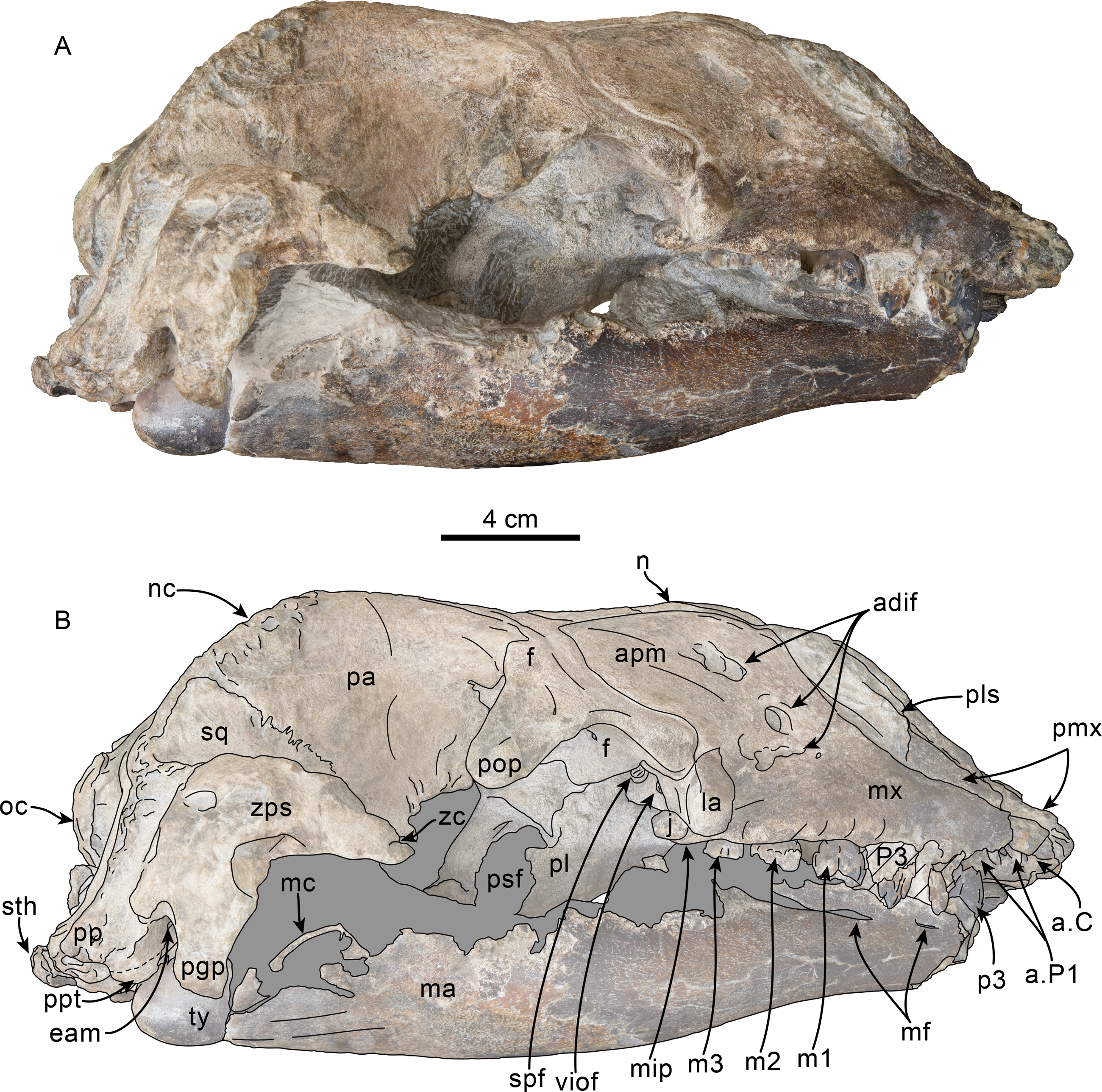
- Holotype skull of O. thalassodon

Scientific classification
- Kingdom: Animalia
- Phylum: Chordata
- Class: Mammalia
- Order: Artiodactyla
- Infraorder: Cetacea
- Parvorder: Odontoceti
- Genus: †Olympicetus; Velez-Juarbe 2017

Type species
- †Olympicetus avitus Velez-Juarbe 2017

Other species
- †O. thalassodon Velez-Juarbe 2023

= Olympicetus =

Olympicetus Temporal range: Oligocene (Rupelian-Chattian), ~33.7–26.5 Ma

Extinct genus of mammals

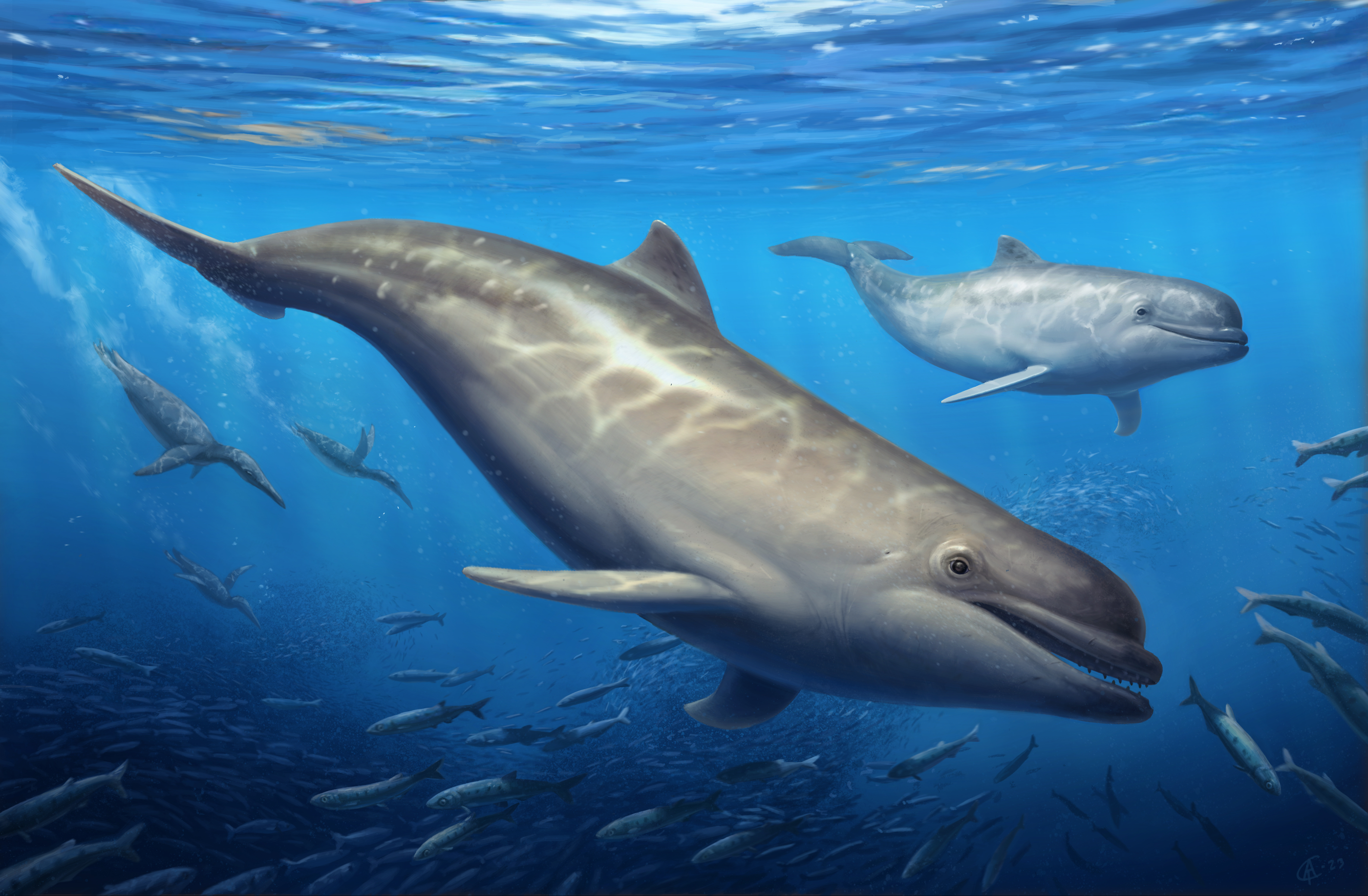
Life reconstruction of O. thalassodon alongside plotopterid birds

Olympicetus (meaning Olympic cetacean) is an extinct genus of small simocetid toothed whales that lived during the Oligocene epoch in what is now the coasts of Washington, about 33.7 million to 26.5 million years ago. The type species is Olympicetus avitus, known from the littoral Pysht Formation and described in 2017. A second species, Olympicetus thalassodon, was named in 2023 and it is also known from this formation.

== See also ==
- Evolution of cetaceans
