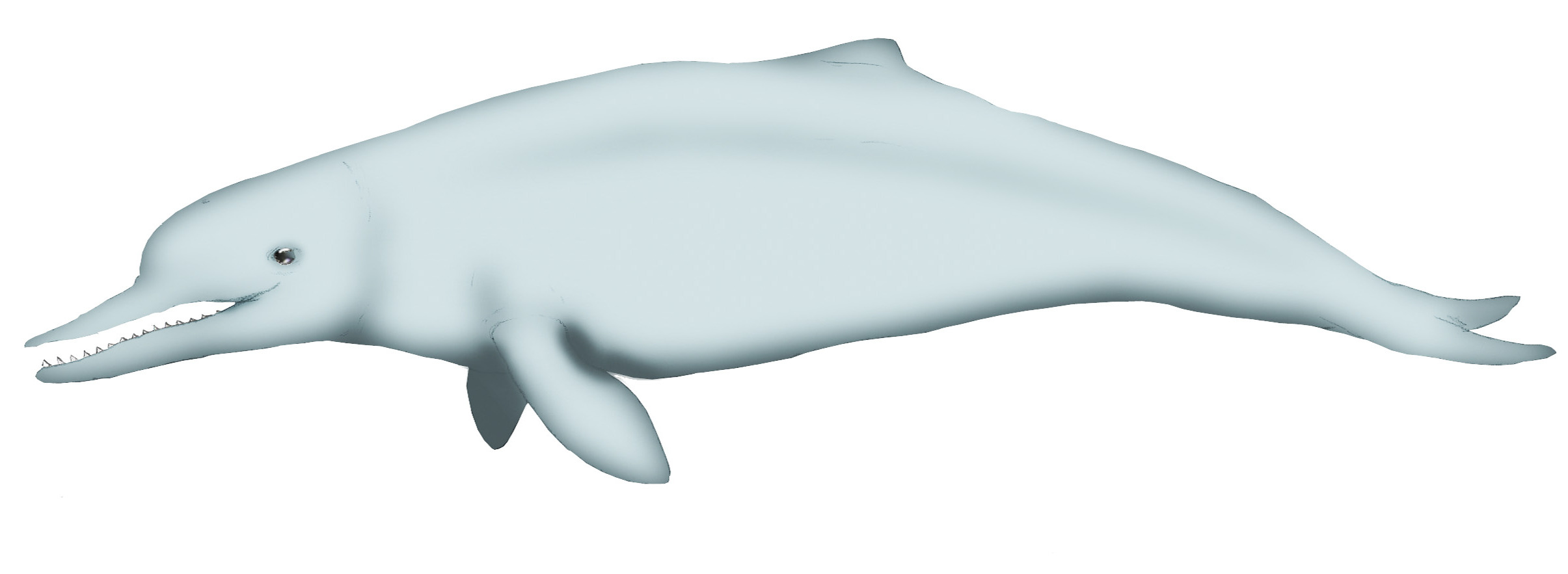
- Life restoration

Scientific classification
- Domain: Eukaryota
- Kingdom: Animalia
- Phylum: Chordata
- Class: Mammalia
- Order: Artiodactyla
- Infraorder: Cetacea
- Family: †Xenorophidae
- Genus: †Cotylocara; Geisler et al., 2014
- Species: †C. macei

Binomial name
- †Cotylocara macei Geisler et al., 2014 (type)

= Cotylocara =

Cotylocara Temporal range: Late Oligocene, 28.4–23.0 Ma

Extinct genus of odontocete cetaceans

Cotylocara is a genus of primitive odontocete from late Oligocene (Chattian) marine deposits of the Chandler Bridge Formation of South Carolina. It belongs to the Xenorophidae.

== Paleobiology ==
Cotylocara was capable of echolocation like modern dolphins, as evidenced by its dense, thick and downturned rostrum, air sac fossae, cranial asymmetry, and exceptionally broad maxillae.

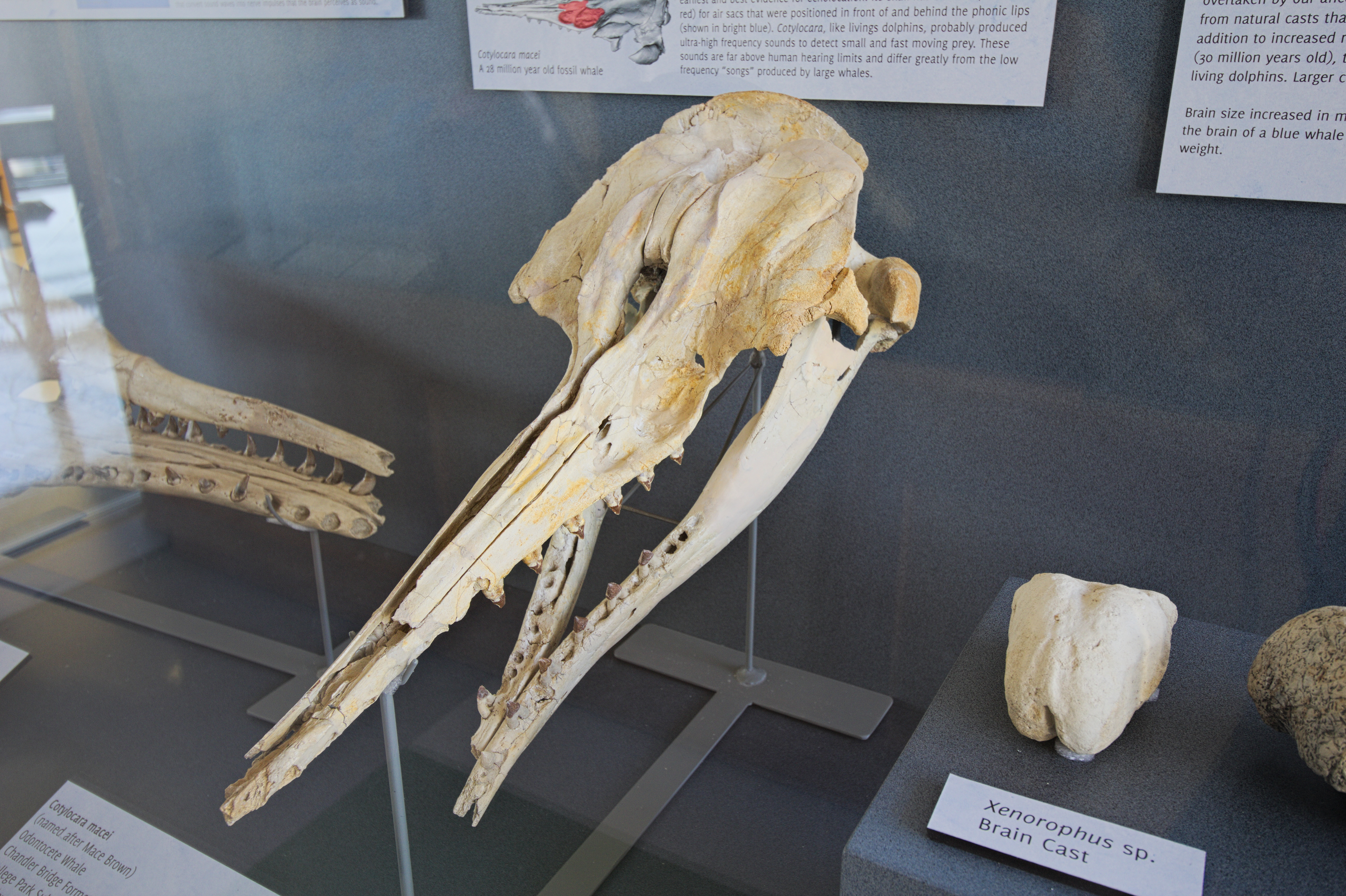
Cotylocara anterolateral at Mace Brown Museum of Natural History
