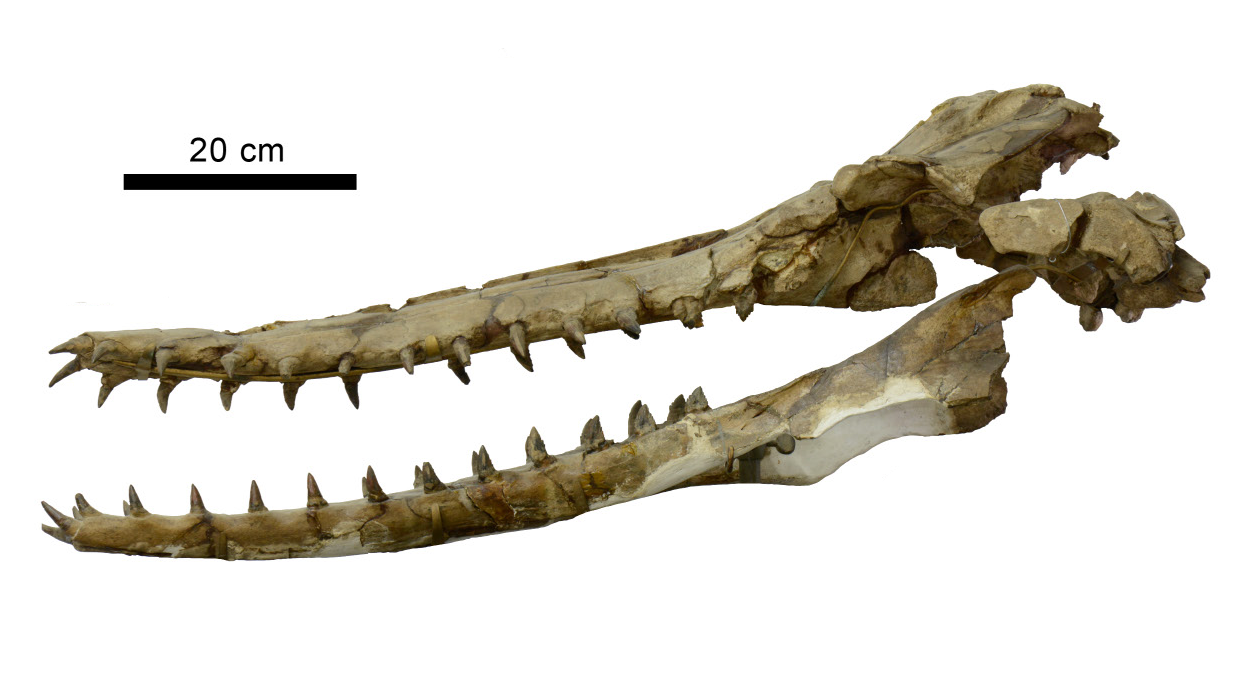
- Holotype skull

Scientific classification
- Kingdom: Animalia
- Phylum: Chordata
- Class: Mammalia
- Order: Artiodactyla
- Infraorder: Cetacea
- Superfamily: Platanistoidea
- Family: †Squalodontidae
- Genus: †Phoberodon; Cabrera, 1926

Type species
- †Phoberodon arctirostris Cabrera, 1926

Species
- P. arctirostris Cabrera 1926 (type)

= Phoberodon =

Phoberodon Temporal range: Burdigalian

Extinct genus of cetaceans

Phoberodon is an extinct genus of archaic odontocete cetacean from the Early Miocene (Burdigalian) of Patagonia, Argentina.

== Taxonomy and description ==
Phoberodon was described in 1926 from a partially complete skeleton with a skull (holotype MLP 5-4) lacking the earbones, which was found in the Colhuehuapian Gaiman Formation of Chubut Province, Argentina. Subsequent authors either followed Cabrera (1926) in classifying Phoberodon as a squalodontid, or considered it a relative of Waipatia although the genus was included in any cladistic analysis of archaic odontocetes. However, known specimens lack a periotic, which incorporates most defining synapomorphies of Squalodontidae, and Viglino et al. (2018) recovered Phoberodon as distantly related to Squalodon.

== Palaeobiology ==
=== Palaeoecology ===
The morphology of its skull and its enamel ultrastructure both suggest that P. arctirostris was a raptorial feeder.
