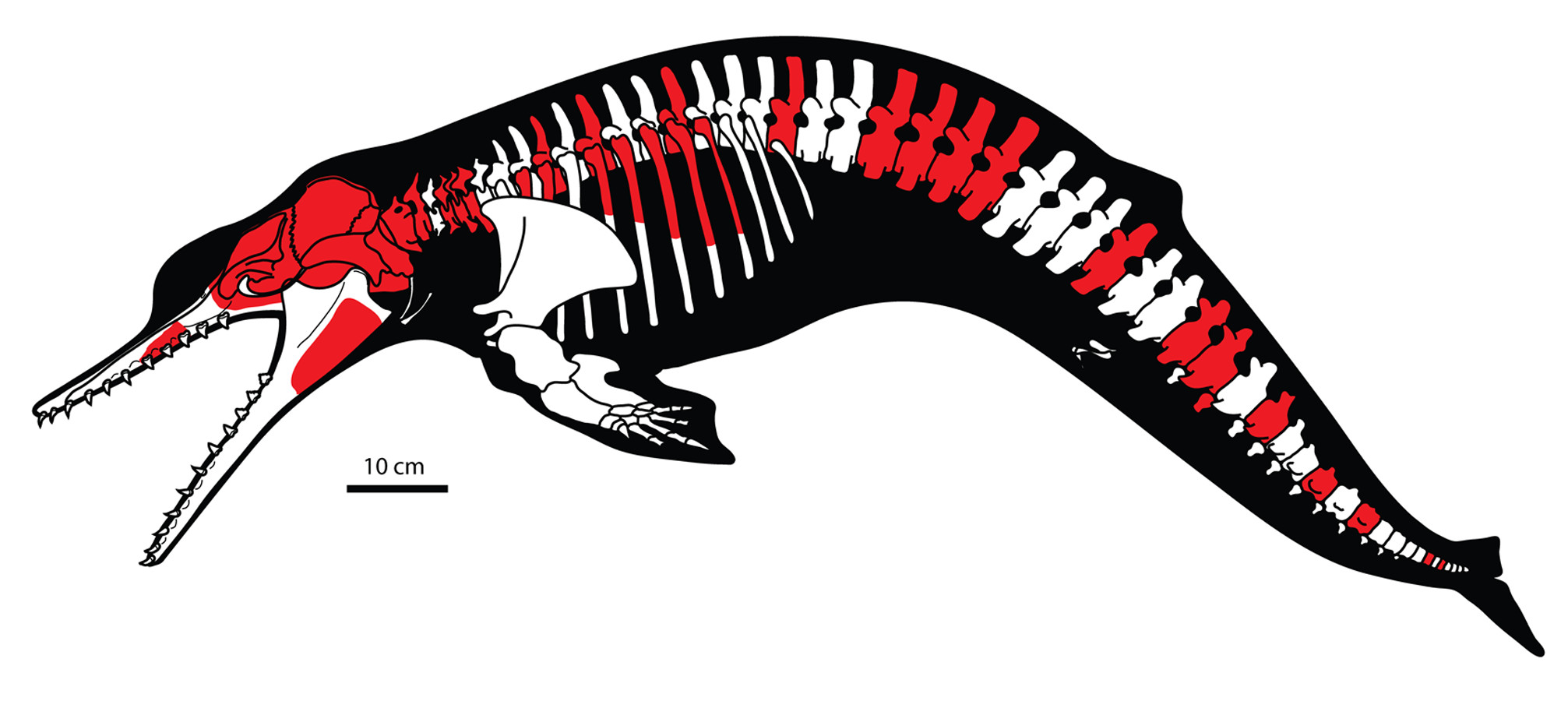

Scientific classification
- Kingdom: Animalia
- Phylum: Chordata
- Class: Mammalia
- Order: Artiodactyla
- Infraorder: Cetacea
- Family: †Xenorophidae
- Genus: †Albertocetus; Uhen, 2008
- Species: †A. meffordorum

Binomial name
- †Albertocetus meffordorum Uhen, 2008

= Albertocetus =

Albertocetus Temporal range: Rupelian

Extinct genus of mammals

Albertocetus is an extinct genus of primitive odontocete cetacean from early Oligocene (Rupelian) marine deposits in North Carolina, and belonging to the family Xenorophidae.

== Description ==
Albertocetus is a relatively small whale, measuring 1.82 metres (6.0 ft) long and weighing approximately 51–73 kilograms (112–161 lb). It is distinguished from other xenorophids in having a large lacrimal bone, a steep ascending process of the maxilla, a short but present intertemporal constriction with a sagittal crest, and a tall median ridge on the premaxilla. The teeth were heterodont and may have been polydont because other xenorophids are polydont.
