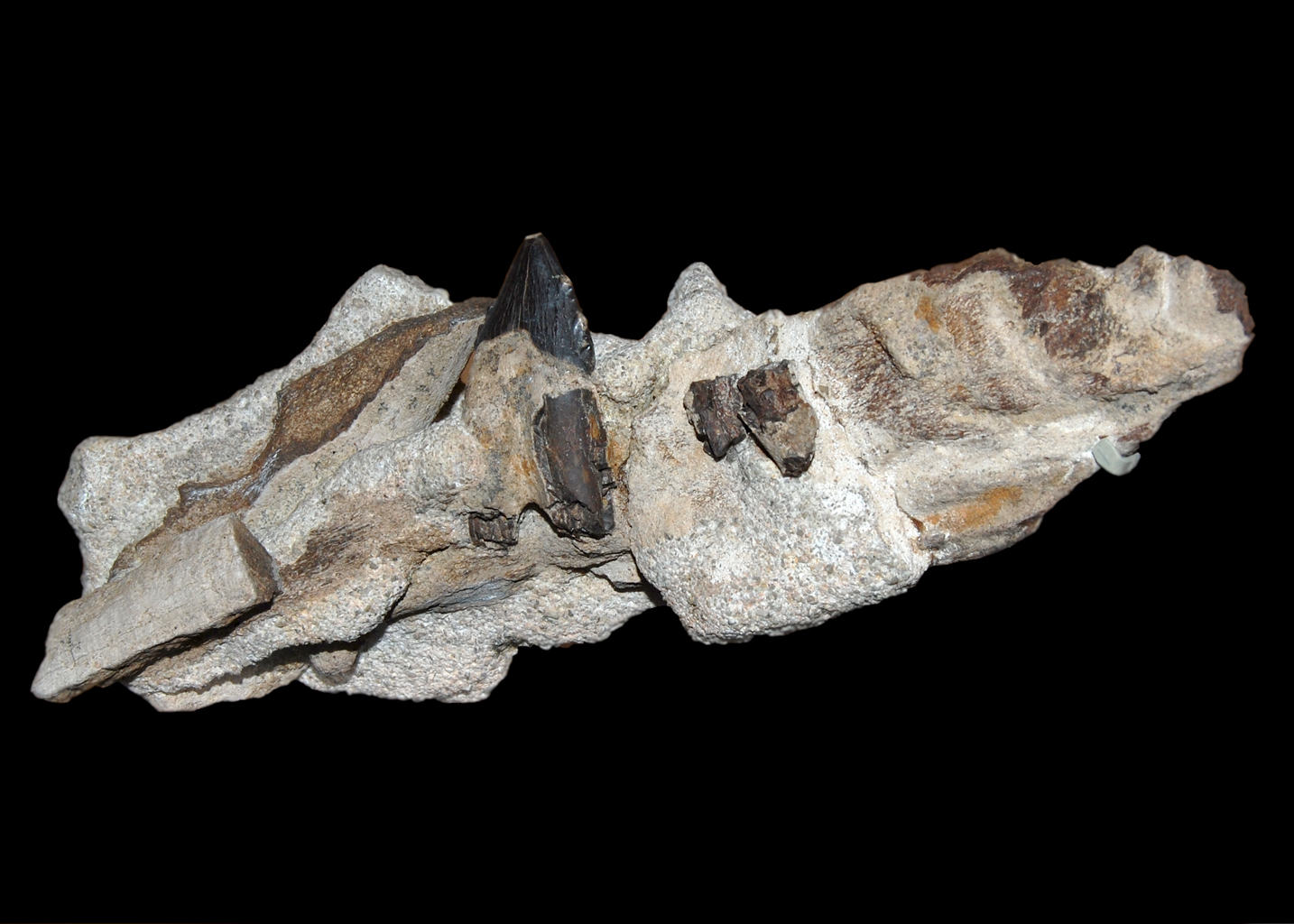
- Patriocetus fossil in Vienna

Scientific classification
- Domain: Eukaryota
- Kingdom: Animalia
- Phylum: Chordata
- Class: Mammalia
- Order: Artiodactyla
- Infraorder: Cetacea
- Family: †Patriocetidae
- Genus: †Patriocetus; Abel, 1913

Species
- P. denggi; P. ehrlichii; P. kazakhstanicus

= Patriocetus =

Patriocetus Temporal range: Late Oligocene–Early Miocene

Extinct species of whale

Patriocetus is an extinct genus of toothed whale.
