= Echovenator =

Echovenator Temporal range: Late Oligocene, 28.4–23.0 Ma

Scientific classification
- Domain: Eukaryota
- Kingdom: Animalia
- Phylum: Chordata
- Class: Mammalia
- Order: Artiodactyla
- Infraorder: Cetacea
- Family: †Xenorophidae
- Genus: †Echovenator; Churchill et al., 2016
- Species: †E. sandersi

Binomial name
- †Echovenator sandersi Churchill et al., 2016

Extinct genus of mammals

Echovenator ("echolocation hunter") is a genus of primitive odontocete from late Oligocene (Chattian) marine deposits in South Carolina. It belongs to the Xenorophidae.

== Description and paleobiology ==
Echovenator is distinguishable from other xenorophids in having a paranaris fossa and fused fronto-nasal and maxillo-premaxillary sutures. The earbone structure shows that this odontocete was clearly capable of echolocation.
