= Archaeodelphis =

Archaeodelphis Temporal range: Late Oligocene, 28.4–23.0 Ma

Scientific classification
- Domain: Eukaryota
- Kingdom: Animalia
- Phylum: Chordata
- Class: Mammalia
- Order: Artiodactyla
- Infraorder: Cetacea
- Family: †Xenorophidae
- Genus: †Archaeodelphis; Allen, 1921
- Species: †A. patrius

Binomial name
- †Archaeodelphis patrius Allen, 1921

Extinct genus of cetaceans

Archaeodelphis is an extinct genus of primitive odontocete cetacean from late Oligocene (Chattian) marine deposits in South Carolina, and belonging to the family Xenorophidae.

== Description ==
Archaeodelphis has polydont teeth, like other xenorophids.
