= South Georgia rift =

Rift valley in the southeastern USA

South Georgia Rift
- Stratigraphic range: 215-175 Ma
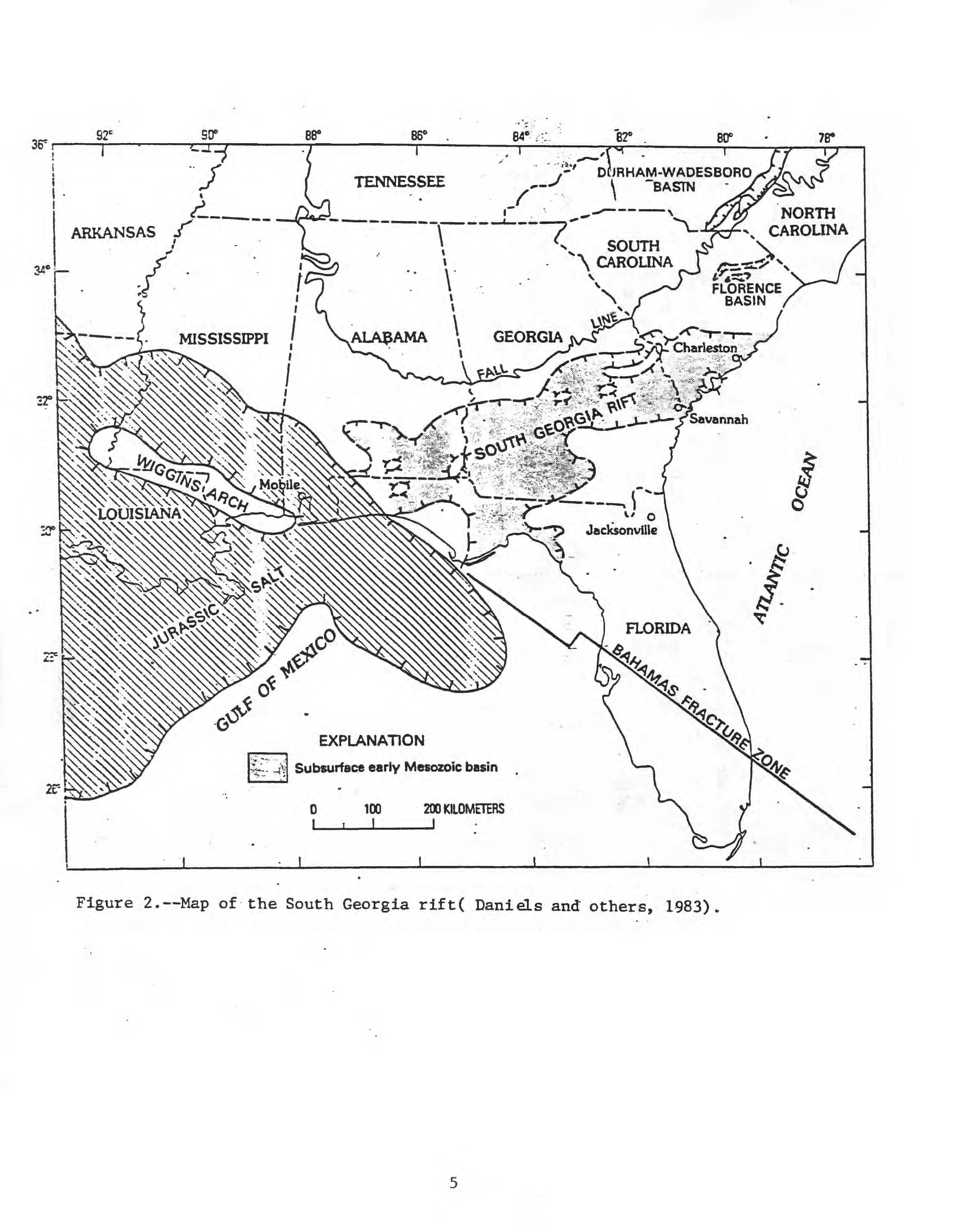
- Map of the South Georgia Rift
- Type: Rift Valley
- Unit of: Rift Valley associated with the break up of Pangea
- Sub-units: Hawthorn Formation, Citronelle Formation, Ocala Limestone, Marks Head Formation, Alum Bluff Formation, Flint River Formation, Tivola Limestone, Claiborne/Jackson Group, Oak Grove Sand, Jackson Bluff, Chipola Formation, Shoal River, Choctawhatchee Formation, Coharie Formation, Brandywine Formation, Duplin Formation, Bear Bluff Formation, Conway Formation, Waccamaw Formation, Canepatch Formation, Peedee Formation, Penholoway Formation, Socastee Formation, Waiter Island Formation, Midway Group, Clayton Formation, Pine Barren Member, Lisbon Formation, Wilcox Group, Tuscahoma Sand,Nanafalia Formation, Gravel Creek Sand Member, Grampian Hills Member, Altamaha Grit, Wilcomico Shoreline Complex, Socastee Formation, Talbot shoreline complex
- Area: ~100,000 km2
- Thickness: up to 3,500 metres (11,480 ft)

Lithology
- Primary: (Surface) Limestone, Sand, clay, sandstone
- Other: (subsurface) basalt, diabase

Location
- Location: South Georgia, Southeast Alabama, western Florida Panhandle, South Carolina Lowcountry
- Region: Southeastern United States
- Country: United States
- Extent: 100,000 square miles, 160,000 square kilometers

Type section
- Named for: Southern Georgia

The South Georgia Rift (SGR) or the South Georgia Rift Basin is a large rift valley in the southeastern United States. It is the largest of all rift valleys in the Eastern North American Margin (ENAM). The rift runs from the extreme western Florida panhandle and southeastern Alabama, through south and southeastern Georgia, into southeastern South Carolina (up to near the Charleston area), and then offshore into the Atlantic Ocean.

== Geology ==
The South Georgia rift is associated with the Central Atlantic Magmatic Province (one of the largest volcanic eruptions in Earth's history), which was part of the initial rifting with the break up of Pangaea. It is also related to the Newark Supergroup rift valleys, which are exposed at the surface further north. Like the Newark rift basins, the South Georgia Rift (including its eastern/central segment that is sometimes informally known as the "East Georgia" rift system) formed as a late Triassic–Early Jurassic continental rift during the initial stages of the opening of the Atlantic Ocean. Today, the rift valley is covered by an extremely thick layer of red bed, sandstones, siltstones, mudstones, and conglomerate sediments. Below this layer in some areas are mafic igneous rocks, basalt flows, and intrusive diabase sills and dikes. Seismic and well data show that the basin is composed of multiple asymmetric half-grabens bounded by large normal faults. Syn-rift strata thickens toward the border faults, similar to other eastern North American rift basins.

Structurally, the South Georgia Rift is unusual among eastern North American rift basins. It overlies a deep crustal suture that is the former boundary between Laurentian crust and Gondwanan crust (Suwannee terrane). Geophysical studies indicate that rifting reactivated old Alleghanian structures along the Brunswick magnetic anomaly and related sutures. This caused the basin floor to form step-downs across inherited zones of weakness rather than a simple single full graben. This rift structure likely influenced both the location and geometry of the rift, which included the development of sub-basins in central and eastern Georgia.

Igneous rocks are oldest at the bottom of the basin, which date to the Late Triassic and are youngest at the top, which are early Jurassic ages. There are also lavas that date to the Central Atlantic Magmatic Province (CAMP) (~201 Ma). Petrophysical analysis of core samples and logs from wells at Rizer #1 and Norris Lightsey #1 shows fluvial and alluvial-fan sandstones, siltstones, and mudstones with variable porosity. These are interbedded with finer lacustrine sediments and are cut by mafic intrusive sills. In eastern sections of the rift valley (South Carolina/central–east Georgia), some of these sediments are overlain by one or more tholeiitic basalt flows. Further west (in Georgia and Alabama), only red-bed sediments are found with no basaltic flows. This shows that there is large lateral variation across the rift basin.

== Sedimentation ==
Seismic studies show that the South Georgia Rift is composed of multiple syn-rift basins (half-grabens) separated by intervening structural highs and sub-basins. These sub-basins were filled during Late Triassic rifting with a thick sequence of continental sediments (mainly from the eroded Appalachian Mountains). Analysis of the rift's porosity profiles suggests the presence of distinct depositional environments. These include zones associated with ancient lakes, fluvial river channels, and alluvial-fan deposits. These observations indicate that the rift valley featured intermittent lakes and rivers within an overall alluvial-plain setting, similar to other Triassic rift basins.

Basaltic lava flows and diabase intrusions are found within the upper part of the South Georgia Rift stratigraphy. A prominent seismic reflector known as the "J horizon" has been identified as a Jurassic-age basalt layer extending across the basin depths of roughly 1–1.5 km near Charleston. This shows that laterally extensive basalt flows solidified on top of the rift sediments. Diabase sills (sheet-like intrusions) are also present within the basin. The basalts and diabases together form a resistant igneous cap above the softer sedimentary red beds below. The occurrences of basalt flows in the South Georgia Rift are regionally restricted.

== Borehole data ==
Because the South Georgia Rift is buried under over 11,000-foot (3,400-metre) sediment deposits in places, much of what is known about its geology comes from boreholes and geophysical surveys. Oil and gas exploration wells in the 1970s first confirmed the existence of Triassic red beds beneath the Coastal Plain. The Clubhouse Crossroads well in South Carolina encountered reddish sandstones and shales at depth—a clear indication of a Mesozoic rift basin (the Dunbarton Basin). Since then, numerous boreholes have been dug, showing the thickness and makeup of its fill. Rock samples show the South Georgia Rift's sedimentary sequence is several kilometres thick in places.

Drill holes have confirmed key aspects of the rift's stratigraphy. In southern South Carolina, the Dorchester 211 and Clubhouse Crossroads #3 wells hit basalt flows and diabase sills overlying Triassic sedimentary layers, which directly verified CAMP volcanic sequences in the subsurface. By contrast, wells in the Georgia portion of the rift (such as those in the Riddleville area) encountered thick red beds but no basalt. This suggests that lava flows did not extend far westward. The overall thickness of the rift fill is substantial: the deepest test well, Norris Lightsey #1, which was drilled in 1984 in Colleton County, South Carolina, reached a total depth of about 4,000 metres (13,000 ft). It penetrated more than 800 metres (2,600 ft) of Triassic red-bed strata (sandstone and shale) before reaching pre-rift basement rocks, making it the deepest well to date in the Triassic section of the basin.

In 2015, a dedicated stratigraphic test well (Rizer #1) was drilled in the southeastern part of the rift to obtain core samples and modern geophysical logs for carbon-storage research. The borehole confirmed the expected sequence of red beds and correlated well with seismic reflections and the nearby Norris Lightsey well. This improved understanding of the rift's subsurface structure.

== Relationship to the Newark Rift Basin ==
The South Georgia Rift formed as part of the same extensional event that produced the Newark Supergroup rift basins of eastern North America. Both the South Georgia Rift and the Newark Basin (along with related basins east of the Appalachian Mountains) developed during the Late Triassic–Early Jurassic breakup of the supercontinent Pangaea. In the Newark Basins (exposed in New Jersey, Pennsylvania, Maryland, and Virginia), multiple lava flows of CAMP age are also above Triassic sedimentary formations. By comparison, the South Georgia Rift, though buried, preserved at least one extensive basalt flow (the J horizon). This flow is found above Triassic deposits, as evidenced by drilling and geophysical data. Because the South Georgia Rift is buried under the Coastal Plain, its sedimentology and palaeoenvironments have been a part of the better-studied Newark Supergroup outcrops. The presence of lakebed mudstone sequences has been theorized based on the Newark Basin's abundant lacustrine deposits.

Despite these similarities, the South Georgia Rift is also different from the Newark Basin in significant ways. The South Georgia Rift is much larger in extent, whereas the Newark and other northern rift basins are comparatively smaller and exposed at the surface. The South Georgia rift is also part a different tectonic setting. It straddles the ancient suture between the North American continental crust and the Suwannee terrane, a fragment of African (Gondwanan) crust. The South Georgia rift also formed on crust that has different composition and structural history than the crust underlying the Newark Basin. This inherited difference may have influenced the South Georgia Rift's structure. The rift may have exploited pre-existing weaknesses along the Alleghanian suture zone. Additionally, the South Georgia Rift's subsidence and magmatism appear to have been somewhat different compared to northern basins, with peak rifting and volcanism occurring slightly later in the south.

== Extent ==
The South Georgia Rift is the largest known Mesozoic rift basin on the eastern North American margin. It extends in a southwest to northeast orientation for roughly 500 kilometres (310 mi), crossing several states under the Atlantic Coastal Plain. The rift's southwestern end lies in southern Alabama and the extreme western Florida panhandle, near the northern Gulf of Mexico. From there it runs northeast through southern Georgia (approximately along the Fall Line region) into South Carolina, reaching its northeastern terminus around the Charleston area. The buried rift underlies a broad swath of the southeastern United States. Area estimates range from about 87,000 square kilometres (34,000 sq mi) up to around 160,000 square kilometres (62,000 sq mi) when offshore portions are included.

Several named sub-basins have been identified, particularly along the rift's margins. On the north-western side of the rift, two major sub-basins separated by a basement high have been recognized: the Riddleville Basin in east-central Georgia and the Dunbarton Basin in western South Carolina. These sub-basins were first delineated through aeromagnetic and gravity surveys combined with well data. The Riddleville Basin (in the vicinity of Riddleville and Statesboro, Georgia) contains at least about 2.2 km of Triassic–Jurassic strata, making it one of the thickest sections of the rift fill. The Dunbarton Basin, farther northeast near the Savannah River site in South Carolina, has about 1 km of Triassic sedimentary fill according to geophysical interpretations. Both sub-basins are separated from the main central trough of the SGR by a broad structural horst. In the central (more southerly) part of the rift, the basin fill is even thicker – a maximum thickness of approximately 3.5 km of sedimentary and igneous rock has been inferred near Statesboro. Toward the rift's edges, the Triassic fill thins out against the rift border faults and gradually onlaps onto the adjacent basement. The overall structural footprint of the South Georgia Rift (often called the Southeast Georgia Embayment in older literature when including the overlying strata) continues offshore: the rift likely extends beneath the Atlantic continental shelf off Georgia and adjacent Blake Plateau.

== Seismic activity ==
The South Georgia Rift lies within the stable intraplate region of North America, but its presence has caused seismicity in the southeastern United States. In general, the rift area has low levels of earthquake activity. One huge exception is the Charleston seismic zone at the northeastern end of the rift. This is one of the most notable seismic areas on the US East Coast and east of the Mississippi River. The Charleston seismic zone, centered around Summerville, South Carolina, lies entirely within the mapped boundaries of the South Georgia Rift basin. This zone is characterised by clusters of small earthquakes and occasional moderate tremors. The modern earthquakes align with the subsurface rift structure, suggesting that ancient faults associated with the rift are still capable of being reactivated under the current stress regime. The overall seismicity of the South Georgia Rift region is not uniform; it is concentrated in this northeastern segment (coincident with the Dunbarton sub basin and related structures) while the rest of the rift zone (extending through Georgia and Alabama) is comparatively quiet.

=== 1886 Charleston earthquake connection ===
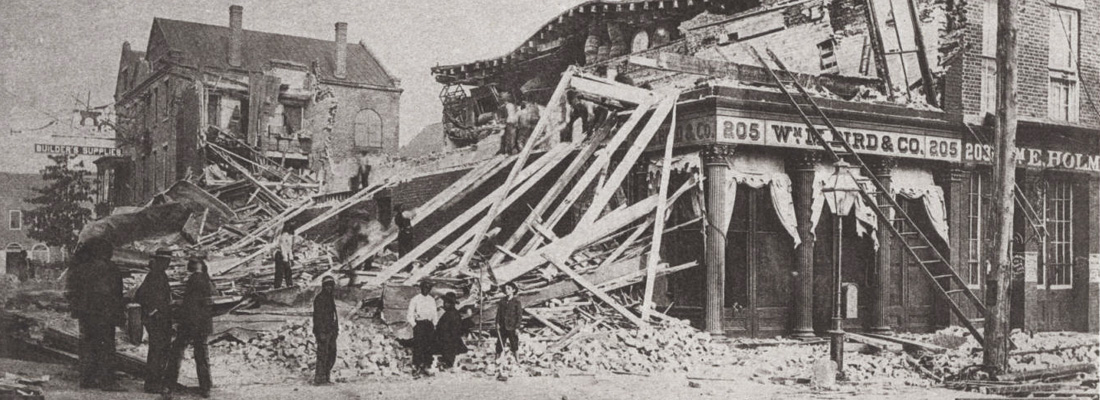
Charleston, SC Earthquake – 1886

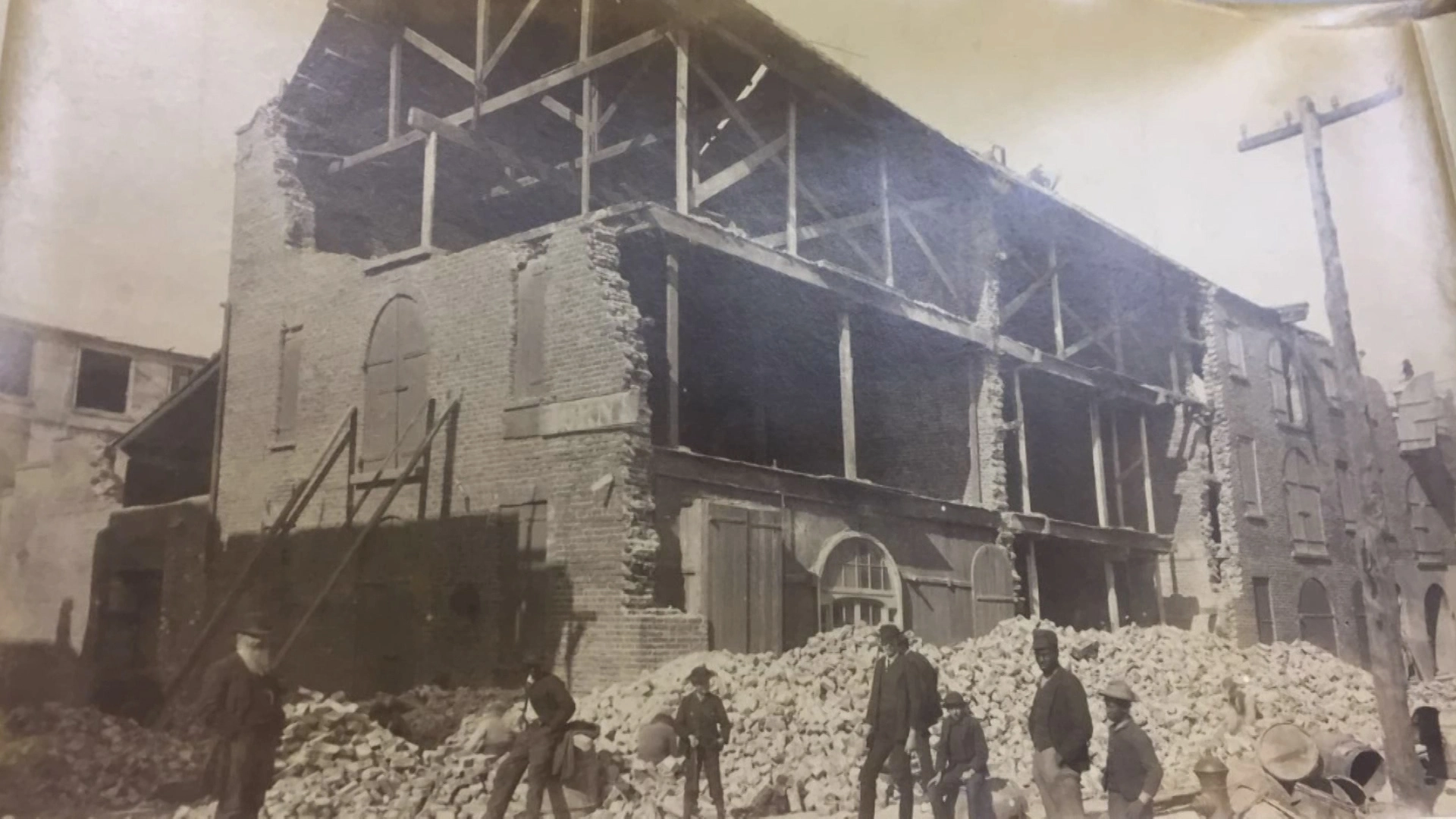
Charleston, SC Earthquake - 1886

On 31 August 1886, a powerful earthquake (magnitude estimated between 6.9 and 7.3) struck the area near Charleston, South Carolina, at the northeastern segment of the South Georgia Rift. Centered around the town of Summerville, just northwest of Charleston, the quake was the most damaging ever recorded on the US East Coast. It caused extreme shaking (intensity X on the Mercalli intensity scale) at the epicenter region, levelling or severely damaging most buildings in Charleston. Between 60 and 100 lives were lost, and damage was reported as far away as Columbia, South Carolina, and Savannah, Georgia. The earthquake was felt over an enormous area. Reports came from as far north as Boston and as far west as the Mississippi River, due to efficient transmission of seismic waves through the rigid crust of eastern North America. The 1886 event remains one of the largest intraplate earthquakes in North American history.

Geological evidence indicates that the 1886 Charleston earthquake resulted from sudden slip on an ancient fault associated with the South Georgia Rift. The earthquake occurred far from any plate boundary, so it has been researched for a long time. Many researchers now conclude that the earthquake likely originated on a reactivated normal fault from the Triassic rift system.

Recent investigations have shed new light on the cause of the earthquake. A re-examination of nineteenth-century surveys, together with modern numerical modelling, scientists identified a right-lateral offset of about 4.2–4.8 metres (14–16 ft) on a section of the South Carolina Railroad southeast of Summerville and uplift of roughly 1 metre (3 ft 3 in) near the town. These observations are consistent with coseismic slip on a west-dipping fault beneath Summerville, commonly referred to as the Summerville fault. The fault aligns with one of the ancient rift-basin fault zones mapped in the South Georgia Rift, strongly linking the 1886 earthquake to the rift's geologic structure.
