= List of fossiliferous stratigraphic units in South Carolina =

This article contains a list of fossil-bearing stratigraphic units in the state of South Carolina, U.S.

== Sites ==
Group or Formation	Period	Notes
Ashley Formation	Paleogene	
Barnwell Sand	Paleogene	
Bear Bluff Formation	Neogene	
Black Creek Group/Donoho Creek Formation	Cretaceous	
Black Mingo Group/Rhems Formation	Paleogene	
Black Mingo Group/Williamsburg Formation	Paleogene	
Canepatch Formation		
Chandler Bridge Formation	Paleogene	
Coachman Formation	Cretaceous	
Cooper Group/Ashley Formation	Paleogene	
Cooper Group/Chandler Bridge	Paleogene	
Cross Formation	Paleogene	
Duplin Formation	Neogene	
Elvins Group/Asbill Pond Formation	Cambrian	
Goose Creek Limestone	Neogene	
Harleyville Formation	Paleogene	
Hawthorn Formation	Neogene	
Horry Clay		
Ladson Formation		
McBean Formation	Paleogene	
Pamlico Formation		
Peedee Formation	Late Cretaceous	
Penholloway Formation		
Raysor Marl	Neogene	
Rhems Formation	Paleogene	
Santee Limestone	Paleogene	
Silver Bluff Formation		
Socastee Formation		
Socastee and Wando Formation		
Ten Mile Hill Beds		
Tiger Leap Formation	Paleogene	
Tupelo Bay Formation	Paleogene	
Waccamaw Formation		
Wando Formation		
Warley Hill Marl	Paleogene	
Williamsburg Formation	Paleogene	

== See also ==
- Paleontology in South Carolina
