= Charleston seismic zone =

Active seismic zone in South Carolina

- Middleton Place/Summerville Seismic Zone
- Etymology: The city of Charleston, South Carolina Location of the Charleston seismic zone
- Named by: Arthur Tarr
- Year defined: 1981
- Coordinates: 33.0379°N 80.1717°W
- Country: United States
- Region: South Carolina coastal plain
- State: South Carolina
- Cities: Charleston, South Carolina

Characteristics
- Top depth: 8,000 metres (26,247 ft)
- Part of: South Georgia rift
- Length: 20 km (12 mi)
- Width: 10 km (6.2 mi)

Tectonics
- Plate: North American plate
- Status: Active
- Earthquakes: 1886 Charleston earthquake (6.7-7.8 magnitude)
- Age: Jurassic

The Charleston seismic zone, also known as the Middleton Place/Summerville seismic zone, is a major seismic zone located near the town of Summerville, South Carolina, United States. It is a result of basement faults from the ancient South Georgia rift, which was active during the break up of Pangaea (~201 Ma). The Charleston seismic zone has the potential for large and catastrophic earthquakes. On August 31, 1886, a fault under the town of Summerville, South Carolina ruptured and produced an earthquake that had an estimated magnitude of between 6.8 and 7.8 on the Richter Scale. This was one of the largest earthquakes ever recorded in the eastern United States.

== Geography ==
The Charleston seismic zone is centered near the town of Summerville, South Carolina (about 20 miles (32 km) northwest of Charleston). Summerville lies directly over an ancient rift valley, the South Georgia rift, which was involved in the initial break up of Pangaea. The seismic zone is located on the coastal plain of South Carolina, with the Piedmont crystalline surface rocks to the northwest, and the Atlantic Ocean to the east and southeast of the area. The Penholoway, Waccamaw, Socastee, and Wando formations make up the surface lithology of the area.

== Geology ==
The geology of the zone is complicated and involves several major geological processes and the interaction of several major geological plates.

=== South Georgia rift ===
The South Georgia rift dates back to the end of the Triassic period. During that time, the supercontinent Pangaea was rifting apart. Initial rifting created a series of half-graben rift valleys together known as the Newark Supergroup. Some of these rift valleys are:

- Culpeper Basin
- Dan River Group
- Deep River Basin
- Fundy Basin
- Hartford Basin
- Gettysburg Formation

These rift valleys were associated with the Central Atlantic magmatic province (CAMP), one of the largest volcanic events in Earth's history. Further south, the South Georgia rift was also erupting basalt at the same time as their counterparts to the north in the Newark Supergroup basins.

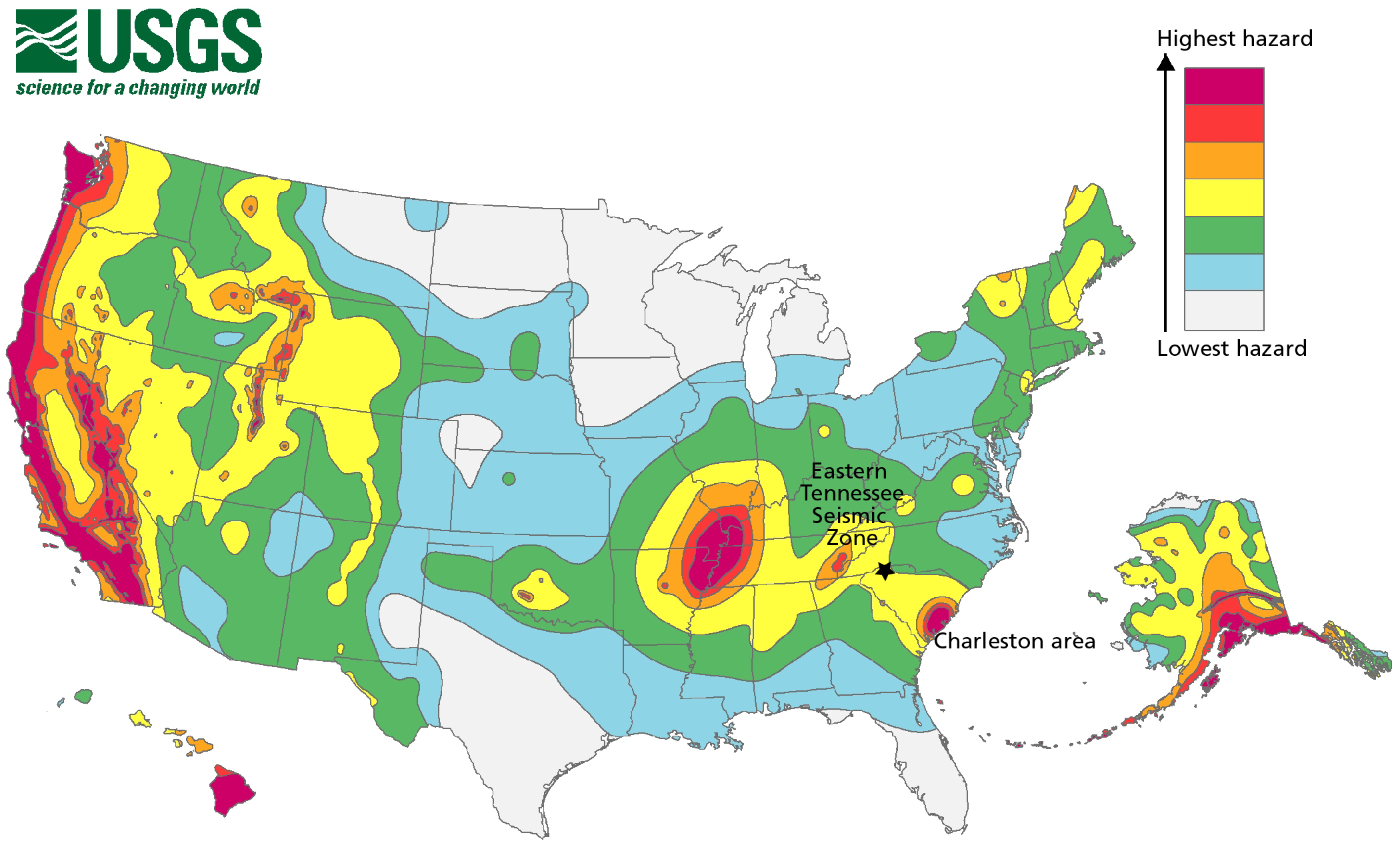
Earthquake hazard map of the United States from the USGS. The Charleston area is listed as the highest hazard level

After Pangaea rifted apart and opened the Atlantic Ocean, the South Georgia rift was left severely fractured. As a result, 4 to 5 different faults intersect around the Summerville, South Carolina, area. Two of the most active faults are the Woodstock and Ashley River faults. This complex setup makes the Charleston seismic zone prone to large earthquakes over time. Even though hundreds of millions of years have passed since volcanic activity occurred, the faults can be reactivated. This happens from far-field plate boundary interactions and movement associated with the North American plate.

=== North American plate ===
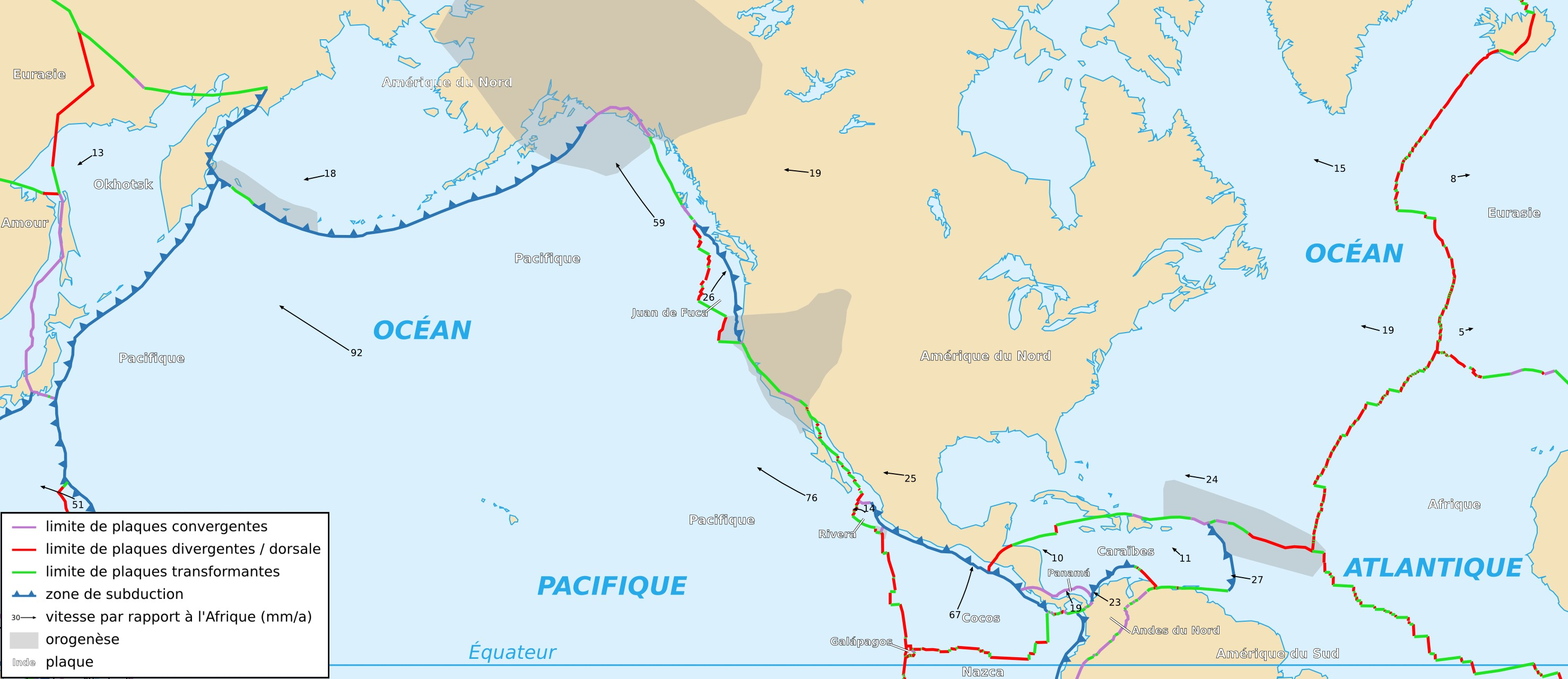
North American Plate tectonic map

The North American plate is constantly under stress from bordering plate boundaries. On its southern boundary, the North American plate interacts with the South American and Caribbean plates. This location is a complex tectonic setting with both subduction at the Lesser Antilles Volcanic Arc and long transform faults (Motagua Fault, the Swan Islands Transform Fault, and the Cayman Trough).

On its southwestern boundary, the North American plate interacts with the Cocos plate. This is marked by a subduction zone at the Middle America Trench, where the Cocos plate subducts under the North American plate. The boundary then transitions to a complex rifting/strike-slip fault configuration further north (San Andreas fault). North of here, the plate boundary transitions back to subduction (Cascadia subduction zone where the Juan de Fuca plate subducts under the North American plate) before transitioning to another long strike-slip fault (Nootka fault).

At the northern terminus of the Nootka fault, the North American plate boundary turns west along the southern Alaskan coast where a ~4,000-kilometre (2,500 mi) subduction zone, the Aleutian subduction zone, marks the North American plate's southern boundary, where the Pacific plate is subducting under the North American plate.

At its northern boundary, the North American plate becomes an ultra-slow spreading center at the Gakkel Ridge. Total spreading rates along this boundary range between 6 and 12.6 millimetres per year (0.24 and 0.50 in/year).

The eastern boundary of the North American plate is the Mid-Atlantic Ridge. This boundary has a direct link to the Charleston seismic zone and the South Georgia rift. The Mid-Atlantic Ridge started as the spreading center that broke up Pangaea, and created the South Georgia rift and the Charleston seismic zone as a result. About 201 Ma later, the ridge is still actively making the Atlantic Ocean wider by around ~1.2 to 5.5 centimetres per year (0.47 to 2.17 in/year).

=== Other boundaries ===
While all plate boundaries surrounding the North American plate play a role in the Charleston seismic zone's behavior, there are two plate boundaries that influence earthquake activity most: the divergent plate boundary at the Mid-Atlantic Ridge and the strike-slip boundary at the San Andreas fault. Their interaction creates compressional forces along the US east coast.

The Mid-Atlantic ridge creates ridge push, which slowly moves the North American plate westward via gravity caused by the cooled basalt sliding down towards the continental margins. This western movement interacts with the San Andreas fault on the US west coast. This rotates the North American plate counterclockwise. As stress builds over time, the shear becomes too great and faults rupture.

== Structure of fault ==
Detailed map laying out fault structures below the Charleston/Summerville, South Carolina area. (USGS)

Many different faults meet in the Summerville, South Carolina, area. Its layout is extremely complicated. It is difficult to pinpoint fault locations and their respective sizes due to the thick layer of sediment that covers the area. In places close to the Charleston seismic zone, sediment layers can be as much as 830 metres (2,720 ft) deep.

Two of the major faults that have been implicated in seismic activity are the Woodstock fault and the Ashley River fault. The Woodstock fault is a right-lateral oblique strike-slip fault. It can be further divided into the north and south Woodstock fault. The Woodstock fault is buried by a deep Mesozoic sedimentary layer that ranges in depth from 2,200 to 12,300 metres (7,200 to 40,400 ft).

The Ashley River fault in contrast is a reverse fault (compressional fault) in response to a plate tectonic stress fields. Both of these faults intersect near Summerville, South Carolina, and are the likely source of large earthquakes, including the 1886 Charleston earthquake.

== Earthquake activity ==
The Charleston seismic zone is one of the most seismically active regions in the eastern United States. Faults under the Charleston area build pressure over hundreds to thousands of years until a large rupture occurs. The area experiences 10 to 15 earthquakes per year, with most being minor (less than 3 in magnitude).

=== 1886 Charleston earthquake ===
In the evening of August 31, 1886, a large and extremely powerful earthquake occurred near the city of Charleston, South Carolina. The epicenter was located very close to the city of Summerville. With an estimated magnitude of 7.3, this was one of the largest earthquakes ever recorded along the US east coast.

For many years, the cause of the Charleston earthquake was unknown. In the 1980s, the source of the earthquake was discovered. A major problem that early studies faced was the huge sedimentary layer that covered the fault.

In 2020, LiDAR (Light detection and Ranging) was used for the first time to see the structure of faults under Summerville. This study revealed that multiple faults may have ruptured during the 1886 earthquake. The 17-kilometer-long Middleton Place lineament, along with the 40-kilometer-long Deer Park lineament (where the Woodstock fault is found), may have worked in tandem and the combined rupture caused the massive earthquake in 1886.
