= Ostrea compressirostra =

Ostrea compressirostra Temporal range: Zanclean to Gelasian ~4.5 Ma to 1.8 Ma

Scientific classification
- Domain: Eukaryota
- Kingdom: Animalia
- Phylum: Mollusca
- Class: Bivalvia
- Order: Ostreida
- Family: Ostreidae
- Genus: Ostrea
- Species: O. compressirostra

Binomial name
- Ostrea compressirostra (Say, 1824)

Subspecies
- O. c. geraldjohnsoni O. c. brucei

Species of bivalve

Ostrea compressirostra is a species of prehistoric saltwater oyster, a fossil that is found in the Yorktown Formation, Chowan River Formation, Waccamaw Formation, and their equivalents in Virginia, North Carolina, South Carolina, and Georgia (U.S. State). Its maximum size is roughly 15 centimetres (5.9 in) in length.
