= Mangelia phrixae =

Scientific classification
- Kingdom: Animalia
- Phylum: Mollusca
- Class: Gastropoda
- Subclass: Caenogastropoda
- Order: Neogastropoda
- Superfamily: Conoidea
- Family: Mangeliidae
- Genus: Mangelia
- Species: M. phrixae

Binomial name
- Mangelia phrixae J. Gardner, 1937

Extinct species of gastropod

Mangelia phrixae is an extinct species of sea snail, a marine gastropod mollusk in the family Mangeliidae.

== Description ==
The length of the shell attains 6.9 mm (0.27 in), its diameter is 2.8 mm (0.11 in).

== Distribution ==
This extinct marine species was found in Miocene strata in the Alum Bluff Group, Florida, United States.
