= Mangelia isabellae =

Scientific classification
- Kingdom: Animalia
- Phylum: Mollusca
- Class: Gastropoda
- Subclass: Caenogastropoda
- Order: Neogastropoda
- Superfamily: Conoidea
- Family: Mangeliidae
- Genus: Mangelia
- Species: M. isabellae

Binomial name
- Mangelia isabellae C.J. Maury, 1910

Species of gastropod

Mangelia isabellae is a minute extinct species of sea snail, a marine gastropod mollusk in the family Mangeliidae.

== Description ==
The length of the shell attains 11 mm.

== Distribution ==
This extinct marine species was found in Miocene strata of the Alum Bluff Formation, Florida; USA.
