= Cooper Group =

Geologic group in South Carolina, US

- Stratigraphic range: Paleogene
- Type: Group

Location
- Region: South Carolina
- Country: United States

The Cooper Group is a geologic group in South Carolina, United States. It preserves fossils dating back to the Paleogene period.

== See also ==
- List of fossiliferous stratigraphic units in South Carolina
- Paleontology in South Carolina
