= Mangelia klimakota =

Scientific classification
- Kingdom: Animalia
- Phylum: Mollusca
- Class: Gastropoda
- Subclass: Caenogastropoda
- Order: Neogastropoda
- Superfamily: Conoidea
- Family: Mangeliidae
- Genus: Mangelia
- Species: M. klimakota

Binomial name
- Mangelia klimakota J. Gardner, 1937

Extinct species of gastropod

Mangelia klimakota is an extinct species of sea snail, a marine gastropod mollusk in the family Mangeliidae.

The known data comes from a fossil.

It has not been extensively documented beyond its initial description.

== Description ==
The length of the shell attains 3.4 mm, its diameter 1.6 mm. The length of its aperture is 1.7 mm.

It is characterized by being small and squat in size with an angular outline.

The line between the conch and protoconch are very distinct with the first rib of the conch outlining the boundary.

It was said to be common at its type locality (see below), but lacked representatives and had no very close analogs elsewhere.

"M." stypteria and "M." sextoni are similar , but have differences that rule them out.

Type locality: No. 2211, lower bed, Alum Bluff, Liberty County, Fl.

Holotype: U.S. Nat. Mus. No. 371081

Occurrence: Chipola formation, localities 2564^r, 3419^r, 2211^c, 7183^r.

Shell is described as being "minute, squat, biconic, the maximum diameter falling near the median horizontal", its spire said to be "moderately elevated and angular". It also noted that the body whorls are broadly conic. The anterior canal is very short, but broad and open. Aperture is oblique and widens very slightly posteriorly, and is acutely angulated at the commissure. Axials are narrow, acute, and commonly flexed slightly behind the periphery and are persistent to the posterior suture, as well as being uniform in strength from the periphery to the anterior suture.

== Distribution ==
This extinct marine species was found in Miocene strata in the Alum Bluff Group, Florida, USA
