= Harleyville Formation =

Geologic formation

- Stratigraphic range: Paleogene
- Type: Formation

Location
- Region: South Carolina
- Country: United States

The Harleyville Formation is a geologic formation in South Carolina. It preserves fossils dating back to the Paleogene period.

== See also ==
- List of fossiliferous stratigraphic units in South Carolina
- Paleontology in South Carolina
