= Chowan =

Chowan is a variation of the name of the Chowanoke American Indian tribe in North Carolina. It may refer to:

- Chowan, the original name of the USS Crusader
- Chowan County, North Carolina
- Chowan River, in Virginia and North Carolina
- Chowan University, in Murfreesboro, Hertford County, North Carolina
- Chowan River Formation, a geologic formation in North Carolina.
