= Mangelia anthetika =

Scientific classification
- Kingdom: Animalia
- Phylum: Mollusca
- Class: Gastropoda
- Subclass: Caenogastropoda
- Order: Neogastropoda
- Superfamily: Conoidea
- Family: Mangeliidae
- Genus: Mangelia
- Species: M. anthetika

Binomial name
- Mangelia anthetika J. Gardner, 1947

Extinct species of gastropod

Mangelia anthetika is an extinct species of sea snail, a marine gastropod mollusk in the family Mangeliidae.

== Description ==
The length of the shell attains 12.4 mm, its diameter is 4.8 mm.

== Distribution ==
This extinct marine species was found in the Alum Bluff Group, Florida, USA.
