= Mangelia sextoni =

Scientific classification
- Kingdom: Animalia
- Phylum: Mollusca
- Class: Gastropoda
- Subclass: Caenogastropoda
- Order: Neogastropoda
- Superfamily: Conoidea
- Family: Mangeliidae
- Genus: Mangelia
- Species: M. sextoni

Binomial name
- Mangelia sextoni J. Gardner, 1937

Extinct species of gastropod

Mangelia sextoni is an extinct species of sea snail, a marine gastropod mollusk in the family Mangeliidae.

== Description ==
The length of the shell attains 3.8 mm, its diameter is 1.6 mm.

== Distribution ==
This extinct marine species was found in Miocene strata in the Alum Bluff Group, Florida, USA.
