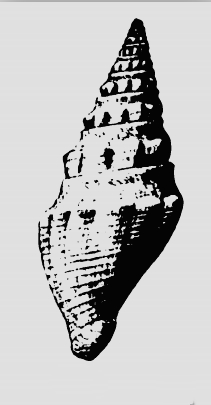
- Original image of a shell of Crassispira boadicea

Scientific classification
- Kingdom: Animalia
- Phylum: Mollusca
- Class: Gastropoda
- Subclass: Caenogastropoda
- Order: Neogastropoda
- Superfamily: Conoidea
- Family: Pseudomelatomidae
- Genus: Crassispira
- Species: C. boadicea

Binomial name
- Crassispira boadicea (Dall, 1900)

Synonyms
- † Pleurotoma boadicea Dall, 1900; † Pleurotoma kempi Maury, 1910

= Crassispira boadicea =

Extinct species of gastropod

Crassispira boadicea is an extinct species of sea snail, a marine gastropod mollusk in the family Pseudomelatomidae, the turrids and allies.

== Description ==
The length of the shell attains 25 mm, its diameter 9.7 mm.

The rather large shell is rudely biconic. The body is angular, the basal curvature very slight. It contains probably 10 whorls in the conch of the perfect adult. The protoconch is smooth but is not perfectly preserved in any of the available material. The anal fasciole is very wide, usually more than half the altitude of the volution, broadly concave, devoid of axial sculpture. The area in front of the fasciole is undulated by the axials, which number 14 on the body of the holotype but which run as low as 11. The axials are most prominent upon the periphery, which they crenulate, rapidly evanescent behind the periphery, persistent to the anterior suture but with constantly diminishing strength. They become obsolete upon the base of the body. The spirals are low, flattened, and rather obscure, usually 3 upon the antepenultimatwhorl 15 upon the ultima, the 6 upon the columella are slightly more elevated than those upon the body. Ssecondaries are fortuitously introduced upon the base of the body. The fasciole exhibits an obscure spiral liration anteriorly. The posterior margin of the whorl is closely appressed against the preceding volution but not conspicuously elevated. The suture line is feeble, and undulatory. The aperture is narrow, widening a little behind by reason of the feeble expansion of the outer lip and the slightly less feeble constriction on the inner. The siphonal notch is broad, shallow, and placed perceptibly nearer to the periphery than to the posterior suture. The parietal wall is smoothly but not very heavily glazed. The anterior canal is long for the genus and rather broad. The anterior siphonal fasciole os rather short, spirally lirate, incrementally rugose, obscurely marginate at its extremity.

== Distribution ==
Fossils from Late Cenozoic strata have been found in Alum Bluff Formation of Florida, United States.
