= Mangelia stypteria =

Scientific classification
- Kingdom: Animalia
- Phylum: Mollusca
- Class: Gastropoda
- Subclass: Caenogastropoda
- Order: Neogastropoda
- Superfamily: Conoidea
- Family: Mangeliidae
- Genus: Mangelia
- Species: M. stypteria

Binomial name
- Mangelia stypteria J. Gardner, 1937

Extinct species of gastropod

Anatomy of a common snail, similar to a Mangelia stypteria

Mangelia stypteria is an extinct species of sea snail, a marine gastropod mollusk in the family Mangeliidae.

== Description ==
The length of the shell attains 5.5 mm, its diameter is 2.3 mm.

== Distribution ==
This extinct marine species was found in Miocene strata in the Alum Bluff Group, Florida, USA.
