= James City =

James City may refer to the following places in the United States:

- James City, North Carolina, an unincorporated area and census-designated place
- James City, Pennsylvania, an unincorporated community and census-designated place
- James City County, Virginia
- James City (Virginia Company), established in the Virginia Colony in 1619
- James City Shire, formed in the Virginia Colony in 1634
- James City Formation, a geologic formation in North Carolina

== See also ==
- St. James City, Florida, an unincorporated community and census-designated place
