= Ten Mile Hill Beds =

- Type: Formation

Location
- Region: South Carolina
- Country: United States

The Ten Mile Hill Beds is a geologic formation in South Carolina. It preserves fossils.

== See also ==
- List of fossiliferous stratigraphic units in South Carolina
- Paleontology in South Carolina
