= Suwannee terrane =

Crustal fragment in southeastern U.S.

The Suwannee terrane, sometimes called the Tallahassee–Suwannee terrane, is a terrane, a block of continental crust, that originated on the edge of Gondwana, and now forms much of the Atlantic Coast of the Southeastern United States, underlying much of Florida and portions of Georgia, South Carolina and North Carolina, and the continental shelf along those states as far as Cape Lookout in North Carolina. The smaller Charleston terrane has been fused to the Suwannee terrane since they collided late in the Neoproterozoic era, about 550 million years ago, and has shared its history since then.

== Definition ==
The Suwannee terrane is a block of continental crust that underlies much of Florida and parts of Alabama, Georgia, South Carolina, and North Carolina, and the continental shelf adjacent to those states. The terrane comprises igneous, metamorphic, and sedimentary rocks of Proterozoic, Paleozoic, and Triassic age that are overlain by thick post-Middle Jurassic sedimentary rocks. The precise boundaries of the Suwannee terrane are not clear because all of the terrane is buried under at least 1,000 meters (3,300 ft) of post-Middle Jurassic sediments. Analysis of the composition of the terrane is dependent primarily on deep wells drilled during exploration for petroleum deposits. The terrane encompasses more than 800,000 square kilometers (310,000 sq mi).

"Exotic" terranes in the Southeastern United States that were sutured to the Laurentian craton during the creation of the North American continent were studied beginning in the 1980s. Proposed names for the most recently added terranes included "Tallahassee/Suwannee terrane", "Brunswick terrane", "North Florida terrane", and "Charleston terrane". As defined when proposed, the "North Florida" and "Tallahassee/Suwannee" terranes largely overlapped, as did the "Brunswick" and "Charleston" terranes, and "North Florida" and "Tallahassee/Suwannee" has given way to "Suwannee" as the name of the most-seaward terrane, while "Brunswick" has given way to "Charleston" for the terrane closer to Laurentia. The two terranes are separated by the Brunswick Magnetic Anomaly, which runs east–west across southern Georgia and northeastward under the continental shelf off of the coasts of South and North Carolina.

The southwestern boundary of the Suwannee terrane is the Bahama Fracture Zone (also known as the Jay Fault), which runs northwestward from the Bahamas across southern Florida and under the Gulf of Mexico to the extreme western Florida panhandle and southern Alabama. Southwest of the Bahama Fracture Zone in the southern part of the Florida peninsula the basement is primarily composed of the Mesozoic-age South Florida Volcanic Rocks. The South Florida Volcanic Rocks and the Suwannee terrane together comprise the basement of the Florida Platform. The Suwannee terrane is bound on the northwest by the Suwannee Suture Zone, also called the Alleghany suture, across southern Alabama. Zircons recovered from Alabama and western Georgia establish the western extent of the Suwannee suture zone. The Suwannee/Alleghany Suture Zone, which may be more than 100 kilometers (60 mi) wide, is the northern boundary of the Suwannee/Charleston terrane in southern Georgia and the Carolinas. It is poorly defined due to sparse data. There is little deformation of Suwannee Basin sediments at their known northern limit, indicating that the Suwannee/Alleghany Suture must be further north. The Suwannee/Alleghany Suture cuts across the grain of the southern Apalachian orogeny, which implies that the accretion of the Suwannee terrane to Laurentia was the terminal event in the formation of Pangaea.

== Osceola Arc ==
The Osceola Arc or Complex comprises Neoproterozoic volcanic and plutonic rocks. It extends more than 750 kilometers (470 mi) east to west and is over 230 kilometers (140 mi) wide. It is bound on the east by the Basement Hinge Zone (approximately the outer edge of the continental shelf) from a point between Cape Lookout and Cape Hatteras in North Carolina to a point off the southeast coast of Florida. It is bound on the southeast by the Bahama Fracture Zone (also known as the Jay Fault) running northwestward across southern Florida and under the Gulf of Mexico to the extreme western Florida panhandle and southern Alabama. It is bound on the northwest by the Suwannee Suture Zone across southern Alabama, and in southern Georgia and the Carolinas by the Brunswick Magnetic Anomaly. Part of the Osceola Arc is overlain by the Suwannee Basin sediments.

Layered volcanic rocks with intrusive magmatice rocks of the Neoproterozoic North Florida Volcanic Series are found in central and panhandle Florida, southern Alabama and western Georgia. They contrast significantly with Triassic and Jurassic volcanic rocks found elsewhere in the southeastern United States. The Osceola Granite, which gave its name to the Osceola Arc, is a batholith, or pluton, centered 1.7–2.4 kilometers (1.1–1.5 mi) beneath Osceola County. Other plutons in the Osceola Arc include the Gaskin Granite in the middle Florida panhandle, and unnamed plutons in southern Alabama. Isotopic composition of the plutons in the Osceola Arc indicate that they origined in an volcanic arc environment. The basement of the Suwannee terrane may be a mixture of Mesoproterozoic era and Archaen eon lithosphere. The Osceola Arc probably developed on the Gondwana continental margin when the plate carrying the Charleston terrane collided with Gondwana.

The Osceola Arc volcanism was contemporary to the Neoproterozoic Pan-African and Brasiliano orogenies. The collision created the Brunswick Suture Zone, a south to southeast dipping crustal fragment that lines up with the leading edge of the Brunswick Magnetic Anomaly.

== Suwannee Basin ==
The first strata of the Suwannee Basin Sediments, a volcaniclastic sandstone, was deposited in the late Cambrian to early Devonian periods. Both paleontological and zircon chemistry evidence places the Suwannee Basin in Gondwana at that time. The Suwannee Basin sediments, which are of pre-Early Jurassic Godwana origin, have been found to average 200 kilometers (120 mi) in width and extend 900 kilometers (560 mi) from the continental shelf of Apalachee Bay in the Gulf of Mexico to the continental shelf off of Cape Lookout in North Carolina, covering an area of about 250,000 square kilometers (97,000 sq mi). The Suwannee Basin sequence of middle Paleozoic sandstones and shales, which is up to 2.5 kilometers (1.6 mi) thick, overlies the Osceola Complex in northern Florida and southeastern Georgia. The Suwannee Basin sediments are 4–6 kilometers (2.5–3.5 mi) thick on the continental shelf from Florida to North Carolina. The northern end of the Suwannee Basin sediments apparently lies between Cape Lookout and Cape Hatteras. On the southeastern side, the Suwannee Basin can only be detected up to the Basement Hinge Zone, a structural boundary that runs from offshore Florida north along the east coast of the United States. The Paleozoic sediments of the Suwannee Basin are typical of sedimentation on a continental shelf, with a mixture of sands derived from continental rocks and marine muds, indicating that they were deposited on the continental crust of Gondwana. The South Florida Volcanic Rocks may cover Suwannee Basin sediments.

== Tallahassee Graben ==
A complex graben system, known as the South Georgia rift, Southwest Georgia Embayment, Apalachicola Embayment, or Tallahassee Graben, underlies much of the Florida panhandle and southern Georgia. It is covered by 2,300–4,000 meters (7,500–13,000 ft) of sedimentary rocks. In other areas in northern Florida and southern Georgia igneous rocks are covered by 1,000–2,000 meters (3,300–6,600 ft) of sedimentary rocks.

Grabens and horsts in the basement of the western part of the Florida panhandle and adjacent continental shelf may have developed due to stresses on the crust caused by the opening of the Gulf of Mexico, or may be horsts that broke off of North America and reattached to the Suwannee terrane. Similarly, horsts that broke off of South America may underlie southern Alabama and Mississippi.

== Charleston terrane ==
The Charleston terrane was a crustal fragment that collided with the Suwannee terrane during the Mesoproterozoic. The tectonic plate carrying the Charleston terrane was subducted under the Suwannee terrane, then part of Gondwana. The subduction initiated the volcanism that created the Osceola Arc on the Gondwana continental margin from about 625 Ma until about 550 Ma, ending when the Charleston terrane collided with the Suwannee terrane. The Osceola Arc probably developed on the Gondwana continental margin when the plate carrying the Charleston terrane collided with Gondwana. The Brunswick Magnetic Anomaly marks the suture between the Charleston and Suwannee terranes. The Brunswick Suture Zone is a seismically detected zone dipping southward that is interpreted as the boundary between Charlston and Suwannee terranes. It is 25–50 kilometers (15–30 mi) wide and 700 kilometers (430 mi) long. The northern boundary of the Charleston terrane is poorly defined due to sparse data. Suwannee Basin rocks occur on both Suwannee and Charleston terrane crustal blocks, indicating that the Suwannee and Charleston terranes joined before the Suwannee Basin sediments were laid down. There is no evidence of pre-Mesozoic rifting in the Suwannee Basin. The entire Suwannee crustal block (including the Charleston terrane) may have been part of Gondwana until the Triassic rifting.

== Origin ==
The Suwannee terrane originated in Gondwana in the late Neoproterozoic. Data from paleontology, isotope geochemistry, and paleomagnetism studies indicate that the terrane was part of the western African continental margin near Senegal. Boreholes in northern Florida that reached sandstones and shales of Paleozoic age have recovered fossils of graptolites, brachiopods, trilobites, crinoids, molluscs, conodonts, palynomorphss, and chitinozoans. The faunal assemblages resemble African or South American assemblages, but none have resembled any North American assemblage. Bore holes have also penetrated granite and other volcanic rocks. The Suwannee terrane contains rhyolitic rocks that correlate geochemically with rocks found in locations along the western margin of Africa. The Osceola Granite resembles the Coya Granite in Senegal. The St. Lucie metamorphic complex (south of the Osceola Granite) matches rocks of the Rokelide orogen in Guinea. The Suwannee Basin sedimentary rocks have been correlated with those of the Bove Basin in Guinea-Bissau; the two features are likely remnants of an extensive basin. It has been suggested that a one billion year old component in the Suwannee terrane indicates a possible origin in northern South America. The Suwannee terrane may be a composite of African and Amazonian lithososphere, with an African upper crust of derived sediment on an Amazonian basement. (Note: The formation of the supercontinent Pannotia between 750 and 530 million years ago brought the Amazonian and West African cratons together.)

The tectonic plate carrying the Charleston terrane was subducted under the Suwannee terrane, then part of Gondwana, during the Mesoproterozoic. The subduction initiated the volcanism that created the Osceola Arc from about 625 Ma until about 550 Ma, when the Charleston terrane collided with the Suwannee terrane. The Osceola Arc volcanism was contemporary to the Pan-African and Brasiliano orogenies. The collision created the Brunswick Suture Zone, a south to southeast dipping crustal fragment that lines up with the leading edge of the Brunswick Magnetic Anomaly. Later, in the late Cambrian to early Devonian, the first strata of the Suwannee Basin Sediments were deposited. Both paleontological and zircon chemistry evidence places the Suwannee Basin in Gondwana at that time. In the late Paleozoic Era, Laurentia (the core of what is now North America) converged on Gondwana, closing the Iapetus Ocean and creating the Pangaea supercontinent. The part of Gondwana facing Laurentia included what are now western Africa and northern South America.

== Rifting ==
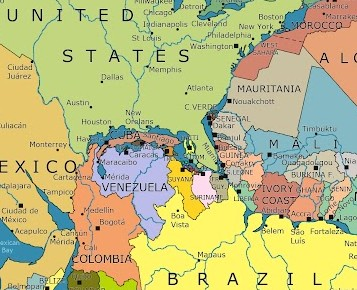
Map of Pangaea with modern countries overlaid. Florida is near the center, extending from North America southward between western Africa and northern South America.

Reconstructions of Pangaea place the Suwannee terrane at the junction of the African, North American, and South American continents. A system of rifts that would eventually produce the Atlantic Ocean began opening along the pre-Pangaea continental margins during the Triassic. The rifting is believed to have been initiated by hot spots, including one near the southern end of the Suwannee terrane. Isotopic signatures of the South Florida Volcanic Rocks, which occur to the southeast of the Bahamas Facture Zone along the south edge of the terrane, indicate they were produced by a hot spot. The South Georgia rift, a graben, started to form across what is now southern Georgia (along the pre-Pangaean margin between Africa and North America), but stopped and became an aulacogen, a failed arm of a triple junction. The rifting shifted, separating the Suwannee terrane from Africa and from South America.

North America began separating from Godwana in the early Jurassic, with the Gulf of Mexico opening in the early Jurassic. Grabens and horsts in the western part of the Suwannee terrane may have developed due to stresses on the crust caused by the opening of the Gulf of Mexico, or may be horsts that broke off of North America and reattached to the Suwannee terrane. Similarly, horsts that broke off of South America may underlie southern Alabama and Mississippi. The continental crust under the South Florida Basin and southern Bahama Banks may be parts of the Suwannee terrane displaced during the opening of the Atlantic and Gulf basins.

== See also ==
- Central Atlantic magmatic province

== Sources ==
- Boote, Susannah K.; Knapp, James H. (December 2016). "Offshore extent of Gondwanan Paleozoic strata in the southeastern United States: The Suwannee suture zone revisited". Gondwana Research. 40: 199–210. doi:10.1016/j.gr.2016.08.011. ISSN 1342-937X.
- Boote, Susannah K.; Knapp, James H.; Mueller, Paul A. (2018). "Preserved Neoproterozoic Continental Collision in Southeastern North America: The Brunswick Suture Zone and Osceola Continental Margin Arc". Tectonics. 37 (1): 305–321. doi:10.1002/2017TC004732. ISSN 1944-9194.
- Heatherington, A. L.; Mueller, P. A. (April 2003). "Mesozoic Igneous Activity in the Suwannee Terrane, Southeastern USA: Petrogenesis and Gondwanan Affinities". Gondwana Research. 6 (2): 296–311. doi:10.1016/S1342-937X(05)70979-5. ISSN 1342-937X.
- Mueller, Paul A.; Heatherington, Ann L.; Foster, David A.; Thomas, William A.; Wooden, Joseph L. (July 2014). "The Suwannee suture: Significance for Gondwana-Laurentia terrane transfer and formation of Pangaea". Gondwana Research. 26 (1): 365–373. doi:10.1016/j.gr.2013.06.018. ISSN 1342-937X.
- Smith, Douglas L.; Lord, Kenneth M. (1997). "Tectonic Evolution and Geophysics of the Florida Basement". In Randazzo, Anthony F.; Jones, Douglas S. (eds.). The Geology of Florida. Gainesville, Florida: University Press of Florida. pp. 13–26. ISBN 9780813014968.
