= McBean Formation =

Geologic formation in South Carolina and Georgia, United States

- Stratigraphic range: Paleogene
- Type: Formation

Location
- Region: South Carolina
- Country: United States

The McBean Formation is a geologic formation in South Carolina and Georgia. It preserves fossils dating back to the Paleogene period. The McBean Formation in east Georgia is made of fossiliferous fine sand and marl. The Shell Bluff, a fossil-collecting site on the Savannah River, gives its name to Shell Bluff, Georgia and is part of the McBean Formation.

== See also ==
- List of fossiliferous stratigraphic units in South Carolina
- Paleontology in South Carolina
