= Mangelia lissa =

Mangelia lissa Temporal range: Miocene

Scientific classification
- Kingdom: Animalia
- Phylum: Mollusca
- Class: Gastropoda
- Subclass: Caenogastropoda
- Order: Neogastropoda
- Superfamily: Conoidea
- Family: Mangeliidae
- Genus: Mangelia
- Species: †M. lissa

Binomial name
- †Mangelia lissa (J. Gardner, 1947)

Extinct species of gastropod

Mangelia lissa is an extinct species of sea snail, a marine gastropod mollusk in the family Mangeliidae.

== Description ==
The length of the shell attains 8.1 mm, its diameter 3 mm.

== Distribution ==
Mangulis lissa was found in the Alum Bluff Group, Florida, USA, among other mollusk species. This means it's from the Miocene Epoch, between 23 mya and 5 mya.
