= Flanner Beach Formation =

Geologic formation in North Carolina

- Type: Formation

Location
- Region: North Carolina
- Country: United States

The Flanner Beach Formation is a geologic formation on the east coast of North Carolina known for its rich record and preservation of middle Pleistocene fossils.

Located in the southern Albemarle Embayment, 2 localities exist in the middle of the Flanner Beach Formation, one at a stratotype on the Neuse river, and the other near Pamlico River. The Neuse River type section represents a sediment starved setting with mixed-salinity shell pods, while the Pamlico River site preserves an undisturbed oligohaline margin–brackish water with a low salinity level–dominated by Rangia cuneata and polychaete burrows. The exposed sediment bed at these two outcrops leave preserved, basal fossilized clam shells.

== History ==
The Flanner Beach formation is a part of a more general region called the Albemarle Embayment. It is a basin, containing sedimentary rock beds as a result of its depositional history. The complex depositional history of this structural feature of north eastern North Carolina is the result of a combination of regional tectonic movement and frequent changes in global sea levels that repeatedly flooded and exposed land (stratotype).

Of the upper Pleistocene period, this formation represents one of the youngest transgressions in the basin. A rapid sea-level rise inundated the coastal lowland, depositing a basal shell lag (containing Rangia cuneata and other mollusks) directly over the swamp deposits.

Ocean waters flooded old river valleys and lowlands, creating a barrier-island and estuarine complex that is now the Flanner Beach Formation.

== Significance ==
In the September of 1986, according to paleontologists, the estuarine basin of the Flanner Beach Formation was discovered with a sequence of fossilized benthic paleo communities (ancient group of seafloor dwelling marine organisms) within the bed.

These ancient communities were sensitive and easily influenced by the surrounding environment's traits. Changes in salinity, substrate textures, seasonality, and water depth, were the many factors that created habitat disruptions that forced the repeated replacement of these communities as a product from environmental changes over time. This is called community replacement.

Due to the varying stratigraphy levels of the Flanner Beach formation, predation signs of each sedimentary level's fossilized organisms were used to determine how the long-term environmental changes affected ancient community diversity and its relation to modern marine diversity; prey-predator interactions coincide with the fossiliferous concentrations that differ between geographical levels along the shores of the Neuse River estuary (more diversity seen at higher levels). Through such observations, the paleontologists were able to parallel the changes in these ancient marine communities, to the geographical change of North Carolina's coast regarding its transition from open bay to a lagoonal setting.

The Flanner Beach Formation's exposed sedimentary levels enables researchers to be able to study the marine biostratigraphy of North Carolina. The formation's significance is seen in its contribution to the development of the Carolina's coastal geographical transformation records.

== See also ==
- List of fossiliferous stratigraphic units in North Carolina
