= List of earthquakes in South Carolina =

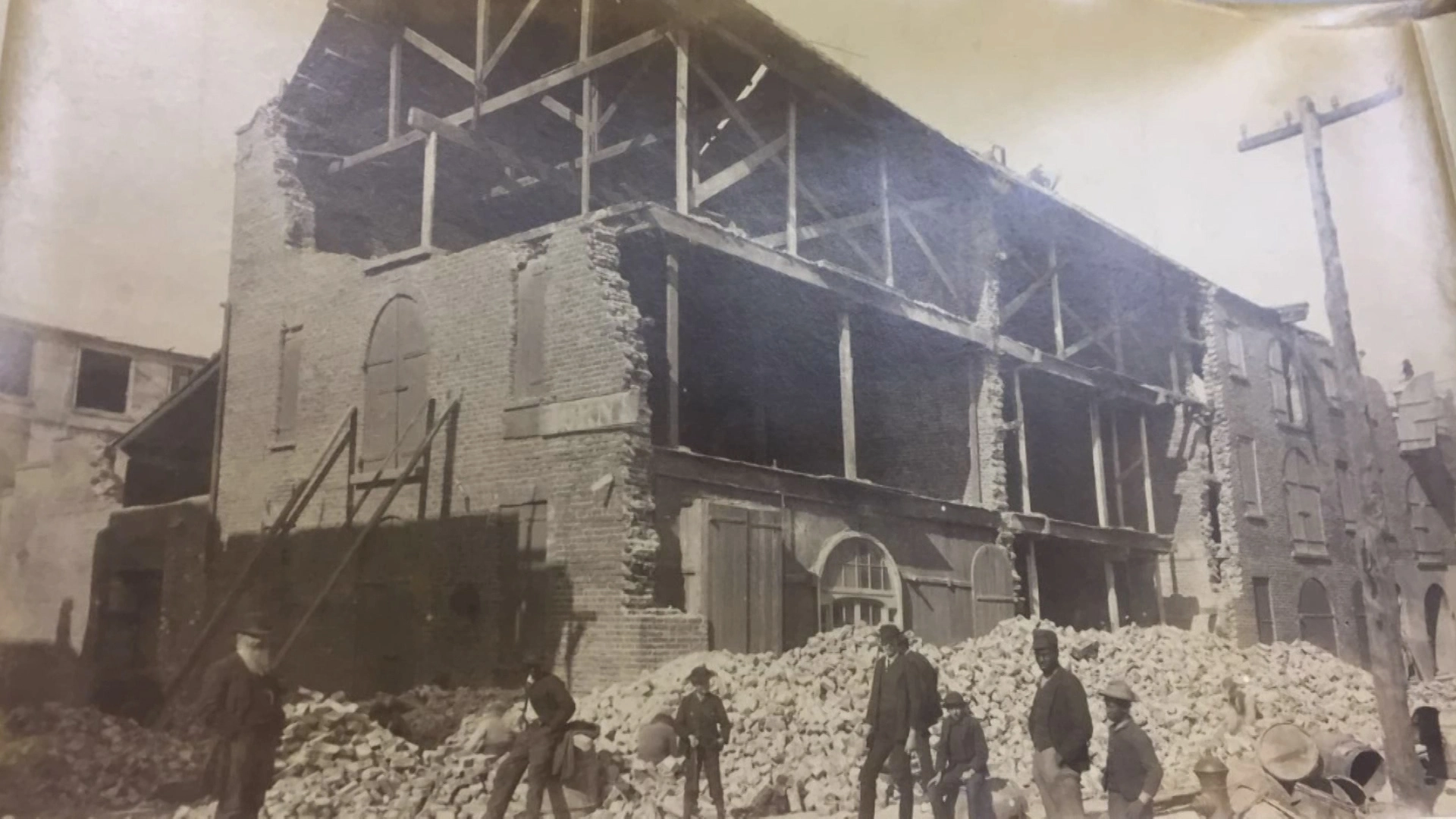
Charleston, SC Earthquake – 1886

South Carolina earthquakes occur with the greatest frequency along the central coastline of the state, in the Charleston area. South Carolina is the most seismically active state on the east coast. At 7.3 magnitude, the Charleston earthquake of 1886 was the largest quake to ever hit the Eastern United States. This earthquake killed at least 60 people and destroyed much of the city. Aftershocks, some of them large enough to be damaging by themselves, continued for years.

Faults in this region are difficult to study at the surface due to thick sedimentation on top of them. Many of the ancient faults are within plates rather than along plate boundaries.

Prehistoric earthquakes of similar size to the 1886 shock have occurred in coastal South Carolina at intervals of several centuries to several thousands of years. In recent decades, damaging earthquakes much smaller than that of 1886 have occurred every decade or two, most recently in May 2026 (magnitude 1.9). Typically, smaller earthquakes are felt each year or two. East of the Rockies, an earthquake shakes the ground over an area up to ten times the area typically shaken by a similar magnitude earthquake on the west coast. For example, an eastern magnitude 4.0 earthquake typically can be felt at many locations as far as 100 km (60 mi) from where it occurred, and it might or might not cause damage near its source. An eastern magnitude 5.5 earthquake usually can be felt out to 500 km (300 mi) in most directions and can cause damage out to 40 km (25 miles).

== Tectonic setting ==
Earthquakes occur deep within bedrock. Most bedrock beneath the Charleston area was assembled as continents collided to form a supercontinent about 500-300 million years ago, raising the Appalachian Mountains. Most of the rest of the bedrock formed when the supercontinent rifted apart about 200 million years ago to form what are now the southeastern U.S., the Atlantic Ocean, and Africa. Today the Charleston area is far from the nearest plate boundary, which is in the Caribbean Sea.

At plate boundaries, the relation of earthquakes to faults is comparatively well understood. In contrast, in the Charleston area, as in most other parts of the U.S. east of the Rockies, the relation is enigmatic. Bedrock in the area is laced with faults that date mainly from the formation of the Appalachians and the birth of the Atlantic. However, in the Charleston area bedrock and its faults are buried beneath sand, silt, clay, and soft sedimentary rocks that may be as thick as 3 km (2 miles). Accordingly, few of the area's earthquakes can be linked to known faults. As in most other regions east of the Rockies, the best guide to earthquake hazards is the earthquakes themselves.

== Earthquakes ==
=== Charleston earthquake of 1886 ===
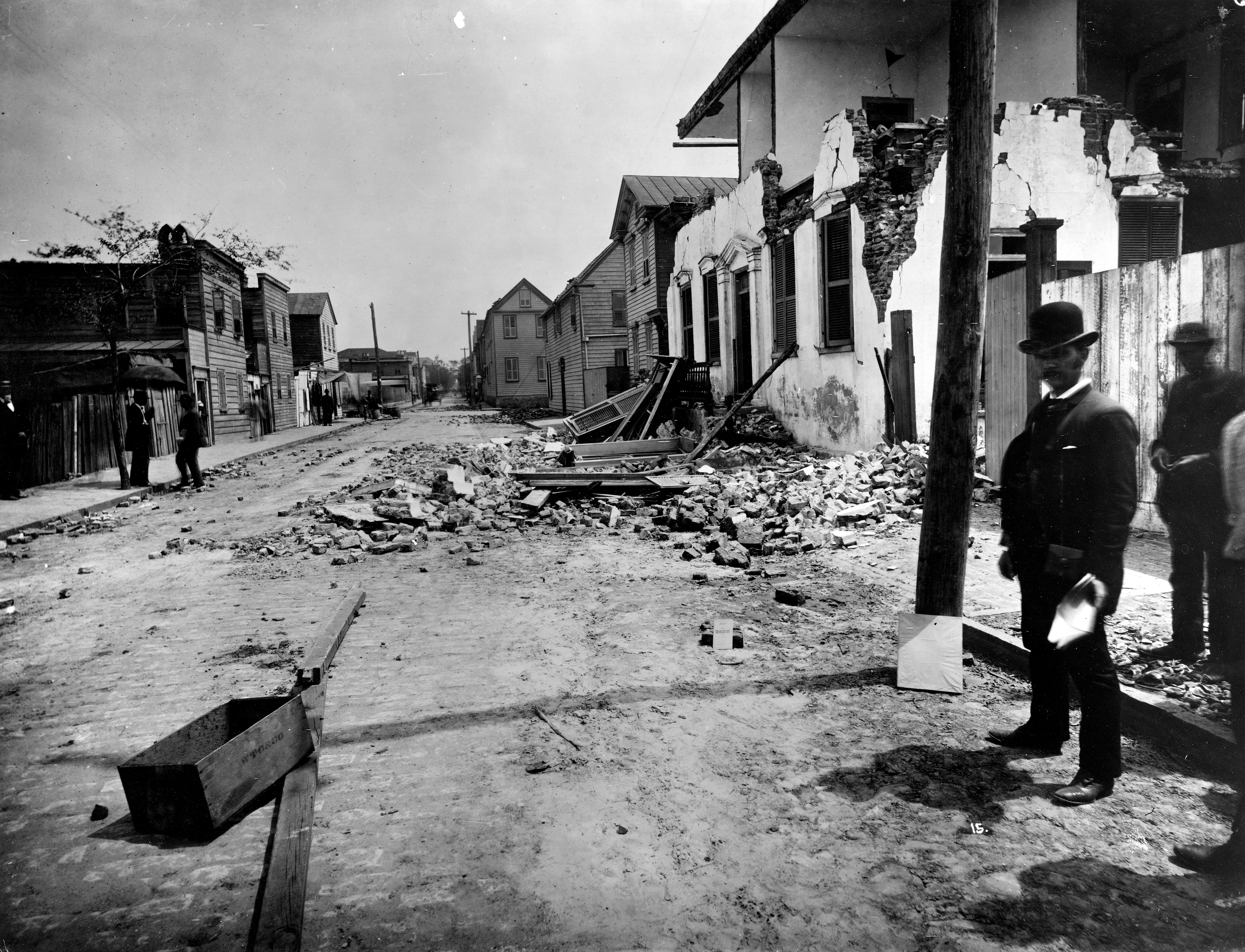
Charleston earthquake of 1886.

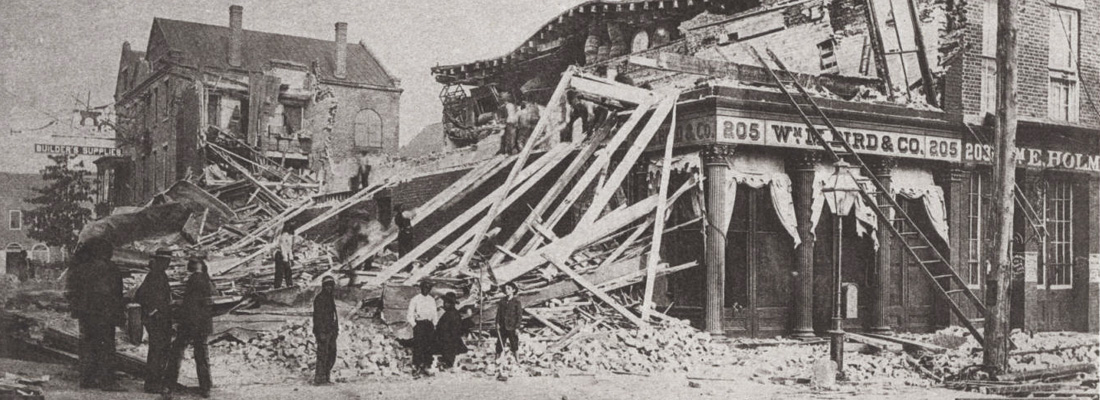
Charleston earthquake of 1886.

An estimated $23 million ($197.08 million in 2025) in damage was caused by one of the great earthquakes in United States history in 1886. Charleston and nearby cities suffered most of the damage, although points as far as 160 kilometers (100 mi) away were strongly shaken. Many of the 20 earthquakes of intensity V or greater (Mercalli intensity scale) that centered within South Carolina occurred near Charleston. A 1924 shock in the western part of the State was felt over 154,000 square kilometers (59,000 sq mi). Several earthquakes outside the State borders were felt strongly in South Carolina.

The August 31, 1886 Charleston earthquake was initially perceived in that city as a barely perceptible tremor, then a sound like a heavy body rolling along; the sound became a roar, all movable objects began to shake and rattle, and the tremor became a rude, rapid quiver. The first shock was at 9:51 p.m. and lasted 35 to 40 seconds. A strong aftershock occurred 8 minutes later. Six additional shocks followed during the next 24 hours. Few buildings escaped damage and many were totally destroyed. Chimneys of at least 14,000 houses were destroyed. The maximum intensity has been estimated at X.

An estimated 60 persons were killed by falling buildings and many more were injured. Within a radius of 160 kilometers (100 mi), the cities of Columbia, South Carolina and Augusta and Savannah, Georgia, also experienced damage. The total area affected by this earthquake covered more than 5 million square kilometers (1.9 million sq mi) and included distant points such as New York City; Boston, Massachusetts; Milwaukee, Wisconsin; Havana, Cuba; and Bermuda. All or parts of 30 states and Ontario, Canada, felt the principal earthquake.

Two strong aftershocks were reported on October 22, 1886, and another on November 5. The first of these was felt (intensity VI) in Charleston, at Atlanta and Augusta, Georgia, and at other towns. The second shock was intensity VII in Summerville. which received significant damage from the August 31 earthquake. Another tremor caused intensity VI effects on November 5 in Charleston and was felt over the same area as the previous aftershocks. The total felt area covered approximately 78,000 square kilometers (30,000 sq mi).

=== Other quakes ===
An earthquake of January 26, 1860 at 7 p.m., described as "the severest one felt in many years," was felt throughout the state and as far away as Macon, Georgia.

On January 23, 1903, houses were shaken strongly (intensity VI) in the area of the South Carolina – Georgia border near Savannah. Intensity IV–V effects were noted at Charleston, III–IV at Columbia, and III at Augusta, Georgia.

A moderate shock affected Charleston, Augusta, and Savannah on April 19, 1907. Dishes rattled and objects were thrown from shelves throughout the 26,000 square kilometer area. A somewhat stronger earthquake caused some damage to chimneys (intensity VII) at Summerville on June 12, 1912. The shock was felt at Charleston with intensity VI and also was felt as far as Brunswick and Macon, Georgia; Greenville, South Carolina, and Wilmington, North Carolina, an area of about 90,000 square kilometers.

The Union County area was shaken with an intensity VI–VII earthquake about 6 months later (January 1, 1913). At Union, cracks appeared in many brick buildings and many chimneys were damaged. The total felt area, roughly elliptical in shape, covered approximately 111,000 square kilometers.

Another earthquake affected the Summerville area on September 22, 1914. Pictures on walls were displaced (intensity V). The shock was preceded by a noise like a train approaching from a distance. The shock was felt (intensity IV) at Charleston and with less intensity at Augusta, Macon, and Savannah, Georgia, an area of about 78,000 square kilometers.

Pickens County was the apparent center of an October 20, 1924, earthquake which shook most of South Carolina and western North Carolina, northeastern Georgia, and eastern Tennessee. The area affected was approximately 145,000 square kilometers. Highest intensities were reported at Pickens, Walhalla, Brevard, and Hendersonville, North Carolina. Buildings were shaken, and furniture was overturned (intensity V). A loud roar accompanied the shock.

On July 26, 1945, an earthquake centered in the vicinity of Lake Murray, about 50 kilometers west of Columbia, was felt over 65,000 square kilometers, including part of Georgia, North Carolina, and Tennessee. No damage was noted and only intensity IV–V effects were observed in the epicentral region.

Moderately strong shocks occurred near Charleston on November 19, 1952, August 3, 1959, March 12, 1960, July 23, 1960, and October 23, 1967. The 1959 disturbance caused minor damage (intensity VI) at Charleston, Summerville, and Wadmalaw Island. Chimneys were damaged, plaster cracked and fell, walls cracked, and objects fell from shelves. Cracked plaster was also reported from Columbia, Johns Island, Meggett, and Pierpont in South Carolina and from Augusta, Georgia. The total affected area was about 65,000 square kilometers. The other earthquakes did not exceed intensity V. The epicenter for the March 12, 1960, tremor was off the coast of South Carolina; Augusta, Georgia, and Greensboro, North Carolina, also felt this shock.

Moderate earthquakes also awakened many residents (intensity V) at Anderson on October 20, 1958, and caused minor damage (cracked and fallen plaster – intensity V) at Chesterfield on October 26, 1959. Another shock on April 20, 1964, was felt strongly (intensity V) at Gaston and Jenkinsville. Places in Fairfield, Florence, Lexington, and Richland Counties also reported the tremors. Several windows were broken in Bowman and Orangeburg (intensity V) from a magnitude 3.4 earthquake on May 19, 1971. Two small shocks, about 3 hours apart, were felt in western South Carolina July 13, 1971. The main shock at 7:42 a.m. edt was felt over approximately 5,200 square kilometers, including two places in Georgia. The tremor was felt by all in Newry; many were frightened by the loud Earth noises (intensity VI), hanging objects swung violently, and furniture shifted.

=== 2002 Seabrook Island earthquake ===
On Monday, November 11, 2002, areas near Seabrook Island, South Carolina experienced a magnitude 4.4 earthquake. The earthquake occurred at a depth of 3.1 miles (5.0 km), 16 miles southeast of Seabrook Island at 32 degrees 22.0 minutes north (32.366N), 80 degrees. 4.4 minutes west (80.073W). There were no reports of damage or injuries.

=== Valentine's Day earthquake 2014 ===
On Friday, February 14, 2014, at 10:23 p.m., an earthquake occurred in the midlands of SC. The epicenter was located near Edgefield SC and could be felt all over SC, Georgia, and Western North Carolina. It was reported to have been a 4.1 earthquake, which is rare for South Carolina.

=== Kershaw County Quakes ===
In late 2021 and most of 2022, southeastern Kershaw County experienced over 80 earthquakes, 11 of which exceeded a 2.5 magnitude. 6 of the quakes exceeded a 3.0 magnitude, the largest of which registering at a 3.6.
