= List of fossiliferous stratigraphic units in North Carolina =

This article contains a list of fossil-bearing stratigraphic units in the state of North Carolina, U.S.

== Sites ==
| Group or Formation | Period | Notes |
|---|---|---|
| Cid Formation | Ediacaran | |
| Millingport Formation | Ediacaran | |
| Bear Bluff Formation | Neogene | |
| Belgrade Formation | Paleogene | |
| Black Creek Formation | Cretaceous | |
| Black Creek | Cretaceous | |
| Tar Heel Formation | Cretaceous | |
| Castle Hayne Limestone | Paleogene | |
| Yorktown Formation | Neogene | |
| Chowan River Formation | Neogene | |
| Croatan Formation | Neogene | |
| Dan River Group/Cow Branch Formation | Triassic | |
| Duplin Marl | Neogene | |
| Eastover Formation | Neogene | |
| Flanner Beach Formation | Quaternary | |
| Horry Clay | | |
| Jackson Group | Paleogene | |
| James City Formation | Quaternary | |
| New Bern Formation | Paleogene | |
| Newark Group/Cumnock Formation | Triassic | |
| Newark Group/Pekin Formation | Triassic | |
| Pamlico Formation | Neogene | |
| Peedee Formation | Cretaceous | |
| Pekin Formation | Triassic | |
| Pollocksville Formation | Neogene | |
| Pungo River Formation | Neogene | |
| River Bend Formation | Paleogene | |
| Silverdale Formation | Paleogene | |
| Tar Heel Formation | Cretaceous | |
| Trent Formation | Neogene | |
| Waccamaw Formation | Quaternary | |

== See also ==
- Paleontology in North Carolina
- Lists of fossiliferous stratigraphic units in the United States
