= New Bern Formation =

Geologic formation in North Carolina, United States

- Stratigraphic range: Paleogene
- Type: Formation

Location
- Region: North Carolina
- Country: United States

The New Bern Formation is a geologic formation in North Carolina. It preserves fossils dating back to the Paleogene period.

== See also ==
- List of fossiliferous stratigraphic units in North Carolina
