= Coffee Mill Hammock Formation =

Geologic formation in Florida

- Stratigraphic range: Late Pleistocene
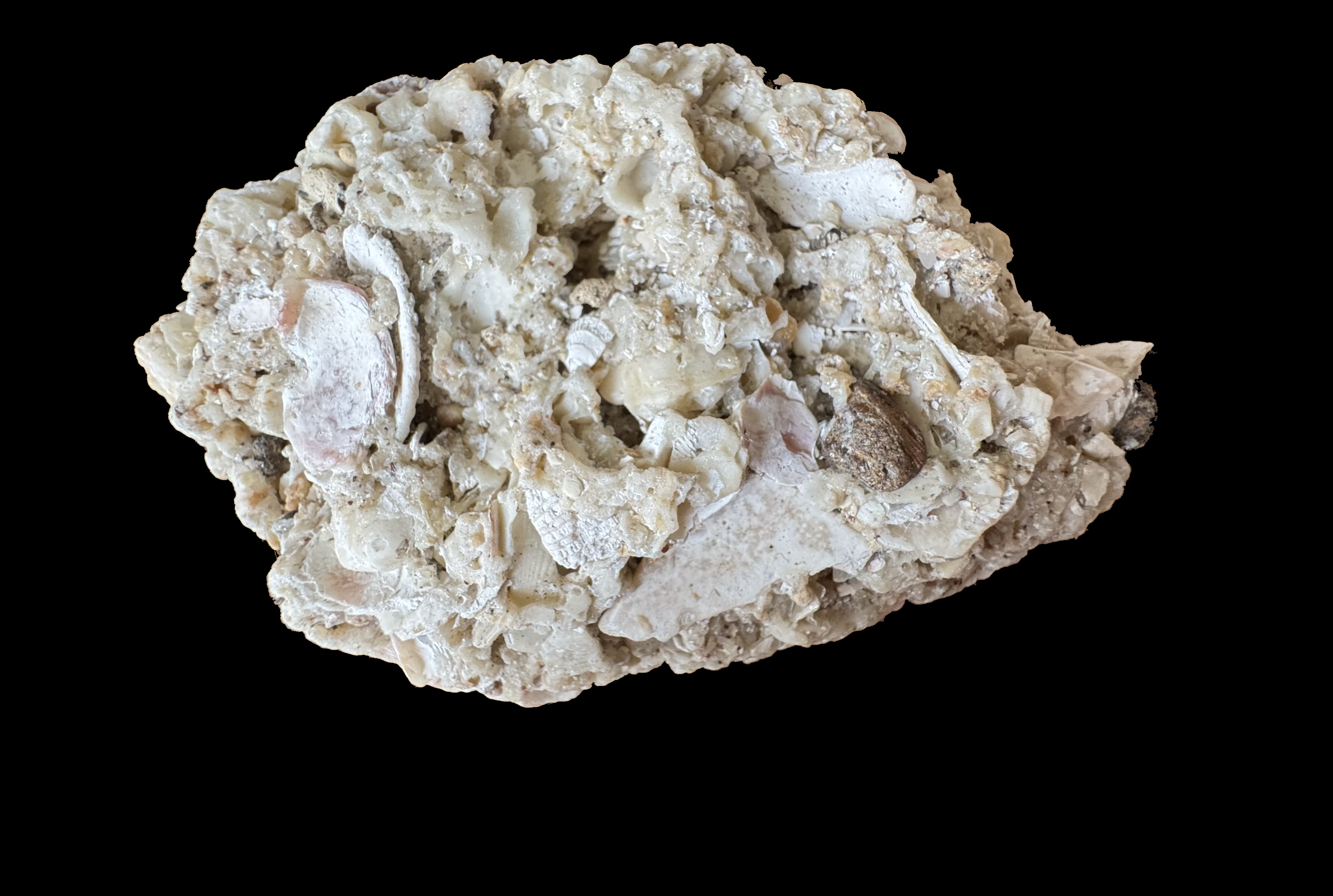
- Coquina sample from the Coffee Mill Hammock Formation
- Type: Formation
- Unit of: Okeechobee Group
- Underlies: Pamlico Formation
- Overlies: Fort Thompson Formation
- Thickness: 3-6 Feet

Lithology
- Primary: Marl
- Other: Phosphate

Location
- Region: Florida
- Country: United States
- Extent: Southwest Florida

Type section
- Named for: Coffee Mill Hammock
- Named by: Elias Howard Sellards

The Coffee Mill Hammock Formation is a geologic formation in Florida. The formation is 3-6 feet thick and is composed of shell marl. It sits on top of the Fort Thompson Formation and preserves fossils from the Late Pleistocene, predominantly Chione elevata. It can be seen at Goodno's Landing, Fort Thompson, and at Coffee Mill Hammock, 12 north of LaBelle, Florida, in Glades County.

== See also ==
- List of fossiliferous stratigraphic units in Florida
