= Choctawhatchee Formation =

- Stratigraphic range: Late Miocene
- Type: Formation
- Unit of: Alum Bluff Group
- Underlies: Jackson Bluff Formation
- Overlies: Shoal River Formation

Lithology
- Primary: limestone

Location
- Region: Florida
- Country: United States

The Choctawhatchee Formation is a geologic formation in Florida. It preserves fossils dating back to the Neogene period.

== See also ==
- List of fossiliferous stratigraphic units in Florida
