= Penholoway Formation =

- Stratigraphic range: ~770 ka
- The Penholoway formation in the lower Savannah River area of Southeastern Georgia, USA
- Type: Geological formation
- Unit of: Coastal Plain Sediment deposits
- Overlies: Waccamaw Formation
- Area: 25 square kilometers (15.5 square miles)
- Thickness: up to 15 feet (4.6 m)

Lithology
- Primary: Sand, Clay

Location
- Location: Northeastern Florida, Coastal Georgia, Coastal South Carolina, Southeastern Coastal North Carolina
- Region: Coastal Plain
- Country: United States
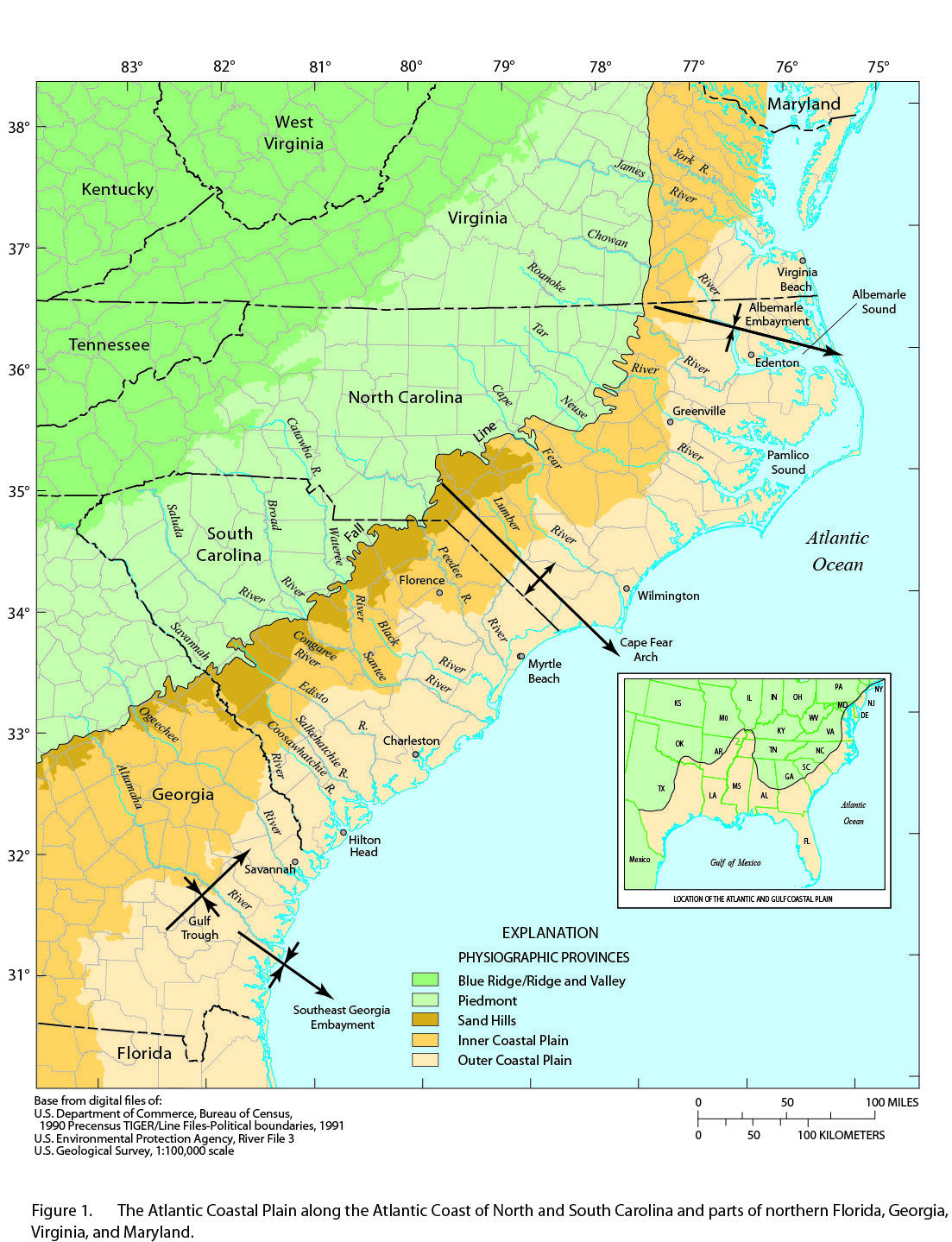
- A map of the United States east coast coastal plain. The Penholoway Formation hugs the coastline from Jacksonville, Florida to Wilmington, North Carolina

Penholoway formation in northeastern Georgia

The Penholoway Formation (also known as the Penholoway terrace or the Penholoway Coastal Complex is a geological formation located along the United States Atlantic coastline. It is one of many coastal formations that formed during the Pleistocene. It can be found along the coast from northern Florida to southeastern North Carolina. It averages 15-21 meters (50-69 feet) above sea level and averages 10 to 25 kilometers (32 to 82 miles) wide.

== Geology ==
During the Pleistocene, the Atlantic Ocean shoreline was 15 to 40 kilometers (9 to 25 miles) further to the west than its current position. Due to erosion and time, the current boundary of the formation is almost straight compared to the current Atlantic coastline. In South Carolina, there is strong evidence for ancient sandbars, barrier islands, and spits.

The formation consists of sand, clayey sand, and clay deposited in shallow-marine to marginal-marine environments. It's notable for a barrier and back-barrier complex (land behind a barrier island) near Summerville, South Carolina. The Woodstock fault bisects the formation as well.

== Terrace uplift and South Carolina earthquakes ==
The Penholoway Formation cuts through The Charleston Seismic Zone; the most active seismic zone on the United States east coast. During the great Charleston earthquake in 1886, which had a magnitude estimated to be between 7.1 and 7.3, the Penholoway Formation measured uplift of ~1 meter (3.2 feet). Since the formation of the Peholoway formation ~770 ka, it's estimated that the formation has been uplifted by between 6-7 meters (19-23 feet) and 12-16 meters (40-50 feet) of dextral offset offset. There is also evidence for liquification of sediments in the formation during the earthquake.

Measuring uplift between 770 ka to present, research can estimate the average interval between large earthquakes (to an extent). Data shows that the average interval between large earthquakes is ~100 ka. However this number is inaccurate. Geodetic studies show anomalously high strain rates to the southwest of the Penholoway Terrace, which suggests renewal intervals of hundreds of years. Present-day seismicity (1:5 < Mw < 4:5) tends to occurs to the southeast of the southern termination of the formation, which is also inferred mainshock rupture.
