= Wando Formation =

Geologic formation in South Carolina, US

- Type: Formation

Location
- Region: South Carolina
- Country: United States

The Wando Formation is a geologic formation in South Carolina. It preserves fossils.

== See also ==
- List of fossiliferous stratigraphic units in South Carolina
- Paleontology in South Carolina
