= Silverdale Formation =

Geologic formation in North Carolina, United States

- Stratigraphic range: Paleogene
- Type: Formation

Location
- Region: North Carolina
- Country: United States

The Silverdale Formation is a Miocene formation of biomicrudite (fine fragments of mollusk shells) in North Carolina, United States.

== See also ==
- List of fossiliferous stratigraphic units in North Carolina
