= Duplin Formation =

Geologic formation in the United States

- Stratigraphic range: Neogene
- Type: Formation

Location
- Region: South Carolina
- Country: United States

The Duplin Formation is a geologic formation in North and South Carolina. It preserves fossils dating back to the Neogene period, Pliocene epoch.

== See also ==
- List of fossiliferous stratigraphic units in South Carolina
- Paleontology in South Carolina
