= Horry Clay =

Historical fossils preservation

- Type: Formation

Location
- Region: North Carolina
- Country: United States

The Horry Clay (pronounced "O-ree") is a geologic formation in North Carolina. It preserves fossils.

== See also ==
- List of fossiliferous stratigraphic units in North Carolina
