= James City Formation =

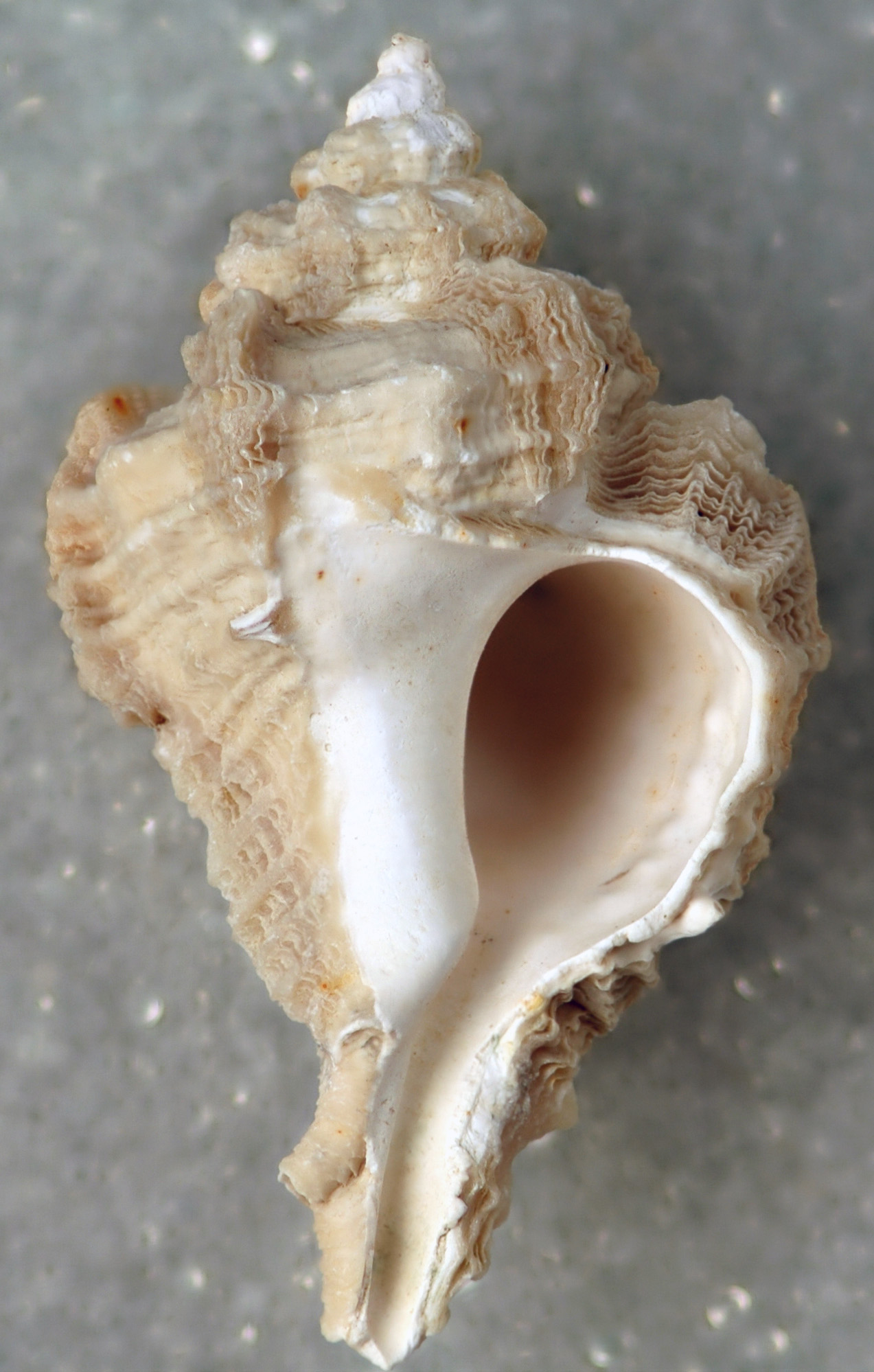
- fossil snail from the James City Formation (a.k.a. Croatan Formation)
- Type: Formation

Location
- Region: North Carolina
- Country: United States

The James City Formation is a geologic formation in North Carolina. It preserves fossils.

== See also ==
- List of fossiliferous stratigraphic units in North Carolina
