= Geology of Guinea-Bissau =

The geology of Guinea-Bissau is oldest in the east and becomes younger toward the west, with sediments from the past 66 million years nearer the coast. Some rock units in the northeast are as much as 680 million years old and throughout the geologic past Guinea-Bissau was influenced by the Mauritanide Belt orogeny and was submerged or partially submerged as a marine shelf or river delta for most of its existence.

== Stratigraphy ==
The oldest rocks in Guinea-Bissau are 680 million years old, dating to the Neoproterozoic in the Koulountou Group in the far northeast of the country. The Koulountou Group includes schistose lava rocks that are part of the Calc-Alkaline Complex of the Mauritanide Belt. The rocks are believed to have originated from volcanism at a continental margin, related to the Mauritanide orogeny.

Radiometric dating of the unmetamorphosed, but slightly folded sedimentary rocks Youkounkoun Group gives an age of 580 million years ago. Geologists believe the Youkounkoun Group may be the remains of amolasse formed after the orogeny. The Mali Group and Batapa Group are both the same age, or slightly younger than the Youkounkoun Group.

=== Paleozoic (541–251 million years ago) ===
The Bove Basin covers most of central Guinea-Bissau, filled with thick sequences of sedimentary rock from the Paleozoic. The lowest unit is the 250 to 600 m thick Pita Group from the Ordovician and early Devonian. The formation has conglomerate sandstones, probably the result of an alluvial plain. The overlying Telimele Group is thought to be from the Late Devonian, due to the presence of graptolite fossils. Similarly, the Late Devonian Bafata Group preserves the remains of a marine carbonate shelf environment.

=== Cenozoic (66 million years ago – present) ===
Mesozoic rocks from 251 to 66 million years ago are largely absent in Guinea-Bissau. In the west, there is an unconformity between Paleozoic sediments and Cenozoic marine sediments, which are cut by mafic dykes.

In the past 2.5 million years of the Quaternary, Guinea-Bissau's surficial geology and geomorphology have changed considerably, with the formation of new terraces and duricrust, as well as frequent marine transgressions.

== Structural geology and tectonics ==
The Bove Basin has a large and shallow open fold known as the Bove-Bofata Syncline, that strikes northeast-southwest. The syncline is cut with brittle faults.

== Natural resource geology ==
Mining is not a significant part of the economy of Guinea-Bissau, except for pits quarrying sand, gravel and clay for roads and building material. Lateritic regolith overlying Paleozoic sediments is known to contain bauxite, but there is currently no exploitation of these resources. Some small, low-grade gold anomalies exist in the northeast of Guinea-Bissau. Geologists have found soil anomalies of zinc, copper, molybdenum and lead associated with Paleozoic sedimentary rocks, although they remain poorly understood.

Eocene carbonates, formed in a shallow, sheltered bay, in the Farim region contain large phosphate reserves, discovered during oil drilling in the 1950s. The Directorate of Geology and Mines drilled seven boreholes in the region in the 1970s and in one hole, encountered a 4.9 meter sandy phosphate layer. Subsequent drilling produced estimates of 112 million tons in the deposit. The phosphate deposit is the southern equivalent of similar deposits in the Mauritania-Senegal-Guinea basin. Mining the deposits would be costly due to 26 to 50 meters over overlying sediments. The government of Guinea-Bissau experimented with applying ground phosphates extracted from the deposit on grain and groundnut fields, but never reported the results.
