= Shoal River Formation =

- Stratigraphic range: Serravallian (Clarendonian); ~13.6–10.3 Ma
- Type: Formation
- Unit of: Alum Bluff Group
- Underlies: Chochtawatchee Formation
- Overlies: Chipola Formation

Lithology
- Primary: Sandstone
- Other: Marl

Location
- Coordinates: 30.8°N 86.3°W
- Approximate paleocoordinates: 31.1°N 83.5°W
- Region: Florida
- Country: United States

Type section
- Named for: Shoal River
- Shoal River Formation (the United States) Shoal River Formation (Florida)

The Shoal River Formation is a geologic formation in Florida. The sandstones and marls of the formation preserve fossils dating back to the Serravallian epoch of the Middle Miocene of the Neogene period.

== See also ==
- List of fossiliferous stratigraphic units in Florida
