= Pamlico Formation =

Geologic formation in Florida and North Carolina, United States

- Stratigraphic range: Latest Pleistocene
- Type: Formation
- Underlies: Myakka soil
- Overlies: Coffee Mill Hammock Formation
- Thickness: 15-20 feet

Lithology
- Primary: Sand, Clay, Loam
- Other: Phosphatic Pebbles

Location
- Region: Southeastern United States
- Country: United States
- Extent: United States East Coast

Type section
- Named for: Pamlico Sound
- Named by: L.W. Stephenson

The Pamlico Formation is a geologic formation in Mississippi, Florida, Georgia, and North Carolina. It preserves fossils dating back to the Neogene period. The name was suggested by L.W. Stephenson in the North Carolina Geological and Economic Survey journal in 1912

== See also ==
- List of fossiliferous stratigraphic units in North Carolina
