= 1886 Charleston earthquake =

Earthquake in South Carolina, United States

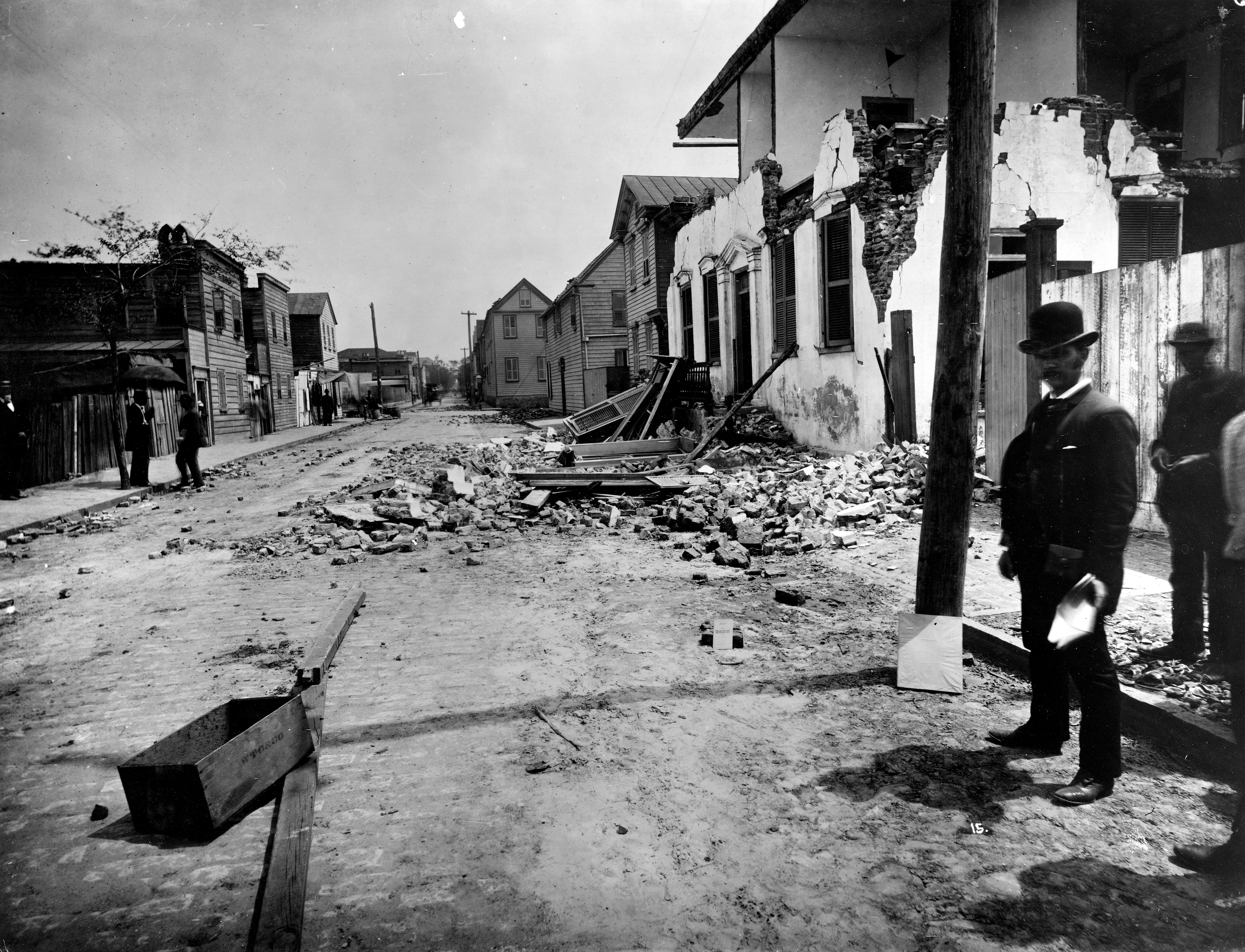
- Damage on Tradd Street

- UTC time: 1886-09-01 02:51:00
- USGS-ANSS: ComCat
- Local date: August 31, 1886
- Local time: 21:51
- Magnitude: 6.9–7.3 M_{w}
- Epicenter: 32.9°N 80.0°W
- Type: Unknown
- Areas affected: South Carolina, United States
- Total damage: $5–6 million
- Max. intensity: MMI X (Extreme)
- Casualties: 60 deaths

An earthquake struck Charleston, South Carolina, and surrounding areas about 9:50 p.m. local time on August 31, 1886. It caused 60 deaths and $5–6 million ($197.08 million in 2025) in damage to 2,000 buildings in the Southeastern United States. It is one of the most powerful and damaging earthquakes to hit the East Coast of the United States.

Scientists have classified it as an intraplate earthquake, and said that it had an estimated moment magnitude of 6.9–7.3 and a maximum Mercalli intensity of X (Extreme). Very little to no historical earthquake activity had occurred in this region, which sits on the Charleston seismic zone, which is unusual for any seismic area.

== Earthquake ==
With the epicenter just northwest of Charleston, South Carolina, the shock was felt as far away as Boston, Massachusetts, to the north, Chicago, Illinois, and Milwaukee, Wisconsin, to the northwest, New Orleans, Louisiana, to the west, and across water to Cuba to the south and Bermuda to the east. The earthquake was so severe that outside the immediate area, there was speculation that the Florida peninsula had broken away from North America. There were at least 60 fatalities.

The long roll deepened and spread into an awful roar, that seemed to pervade at once the troubled earth and the still air above and around. The tremor was now a rude, rapid quiver, that agitated the whole lofty, strong-walled building as though it were being shaken--shaken by the hand of an immeasurable power, with intent to tear its joints asunder and scatter its stones and bricks abroad, as a tree casts its over-ripened fruit before the breath of the gale.

— Carl McKinley, "Chapter 1. The earthquake at Charleston" pg. 212, The Charleston earthquake of August 31, 1886 (1889)

Sand boils were common throughout the affected area due to soil liquefaction. Aftershocks continued to be felt for weeks after the event. Minor earthquake activity that still continues in the area in the early 21st century may be a continuation of aftershocks.

With the development of earthquake studies and technology, this event has been extensively studied as an example of an intraplate earthquake. It is believed to have occurred on faults formed during the break-up of Pangaea. Similar faults are found all along the east coast of North America. It is thought that such ancient faults remain active from forces exerted on them by present-day motions of the North American plate. The exact mechanisms of intraplate earthquakes are a subject of much ongoing research.

Roger Bilham and Susan Hough studied historical mapping projects published between 1884 and 1919 and discovered a 1 m (3 ft 3 in) uplift at Summerville along the South Carolina Railroad. Photographic evidence of the South Carolina Railroad southeast of Summerville also showed a right-lateral offset of 4.5 ± 0.3 m (14.76 ± 0.98 ft) on the track. Direct observation of the earthquake's effects also reported the rail bed being "forced to the right", supporting the identification of this offset. This offset occurred at the location of the Summerville Fault; the fault's position also aligns itself with the results of seismic reflection surveys. Seismicity of the area supports a north-northeast–south-southwest trending, west-dipping structure at an angle of 40–45°. They proposed a 27 km (17 mi) long rupture along the fault based on the description of extreme damage in Summerville and a lesser severity of damage in Pinopolis, further north of the proposed northern rupture termination.

=== Damage ===
==== Building damage ====
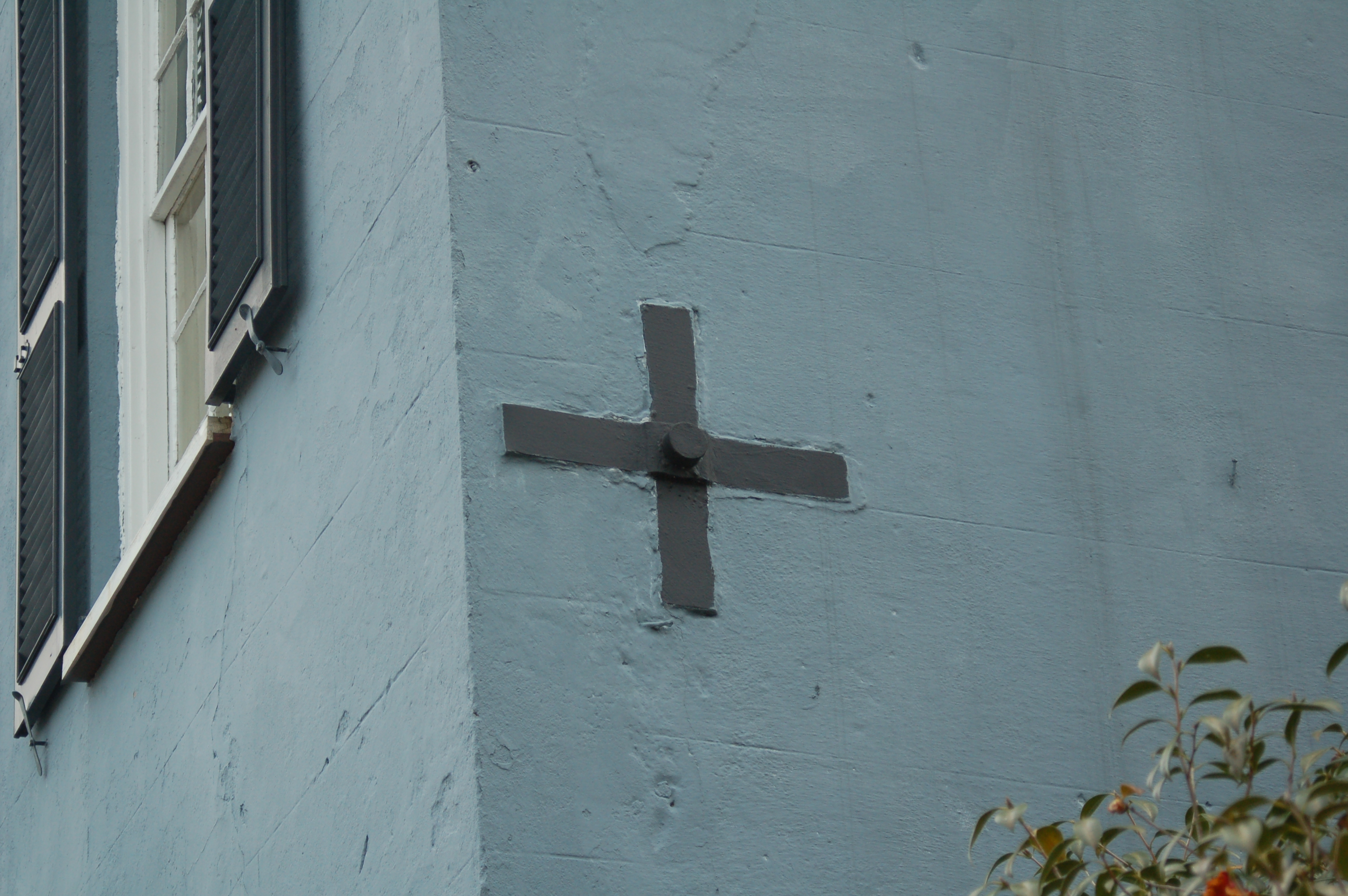
One of many "earthquake bolts" found throughout period houses in Charleston

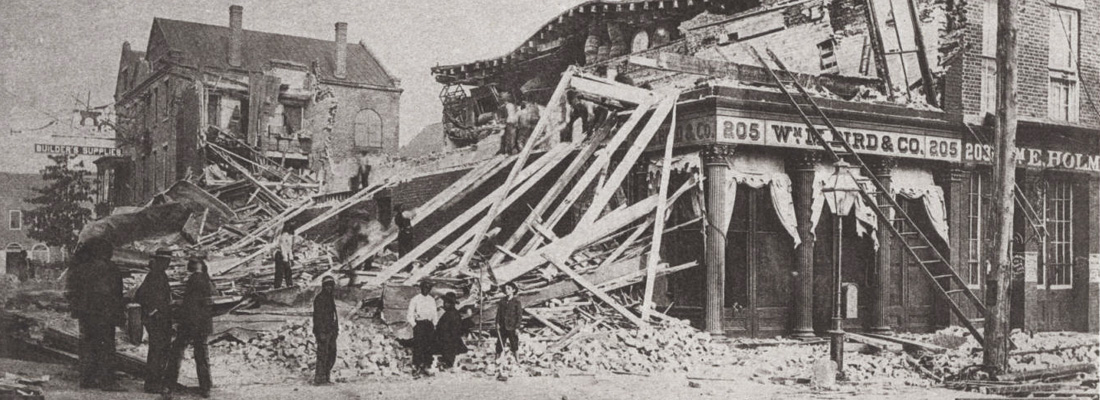
Charleston, SC Earthquake – 1886

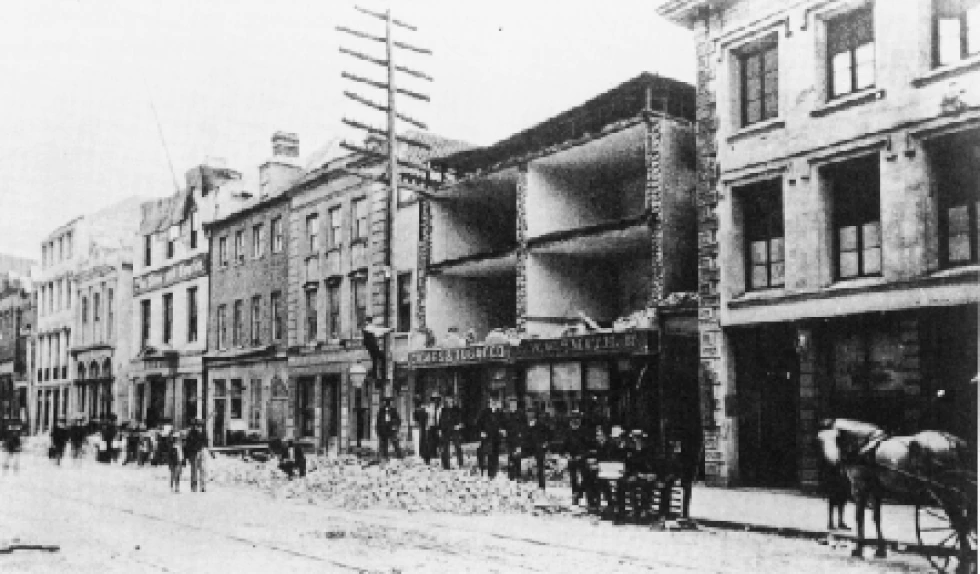
Charleston, SC Earthquake – 1886

Within the city, many of the buildings sustained damage; some had to be torn down and rebuilt. The most prominent damage was done to buildings constructed out of brick, amounting to 81% of building damage. Buildings that had a wood frame suffered significantly less damage. Another factor that affected the percent of buildings destroyed was what kind of ground these buildings were built on. Buildings constructed on made ground were significantly more likely to be damaged than buildings constructed on solid ground; however, this relationship only occurred in wood-frame buildings, with 14% of wood-frame buildings built on made ground sustaining damage, compared to 0.5% of wood-frame buildings built on solid ground sustaining damage. This relationship was negligible as it pertains to the damage of buildings made of brick.

The most prominent buildings that were destroyed were commercial buildings, while residential buildings sustained significantly less damage. This is due to the fact that commercial buildings were older, had a more prominent top compared to the base of the building, and were made of brick.

The Old White Meeting House near Summerville, Dorchester County, South Carolina was reduced to ruins.

Other man-made structures were also damaged as a result of earth splits caused by the earthquake. Railroad tracks in Charleston and nearby areas were snapped and trains were derailed. Dams broke, which caused flooding in surrounding farms and roads. The ground liquefied in many spots which further damaged many buildings, roads, bridges, and farm fields.

==== Other damage ====
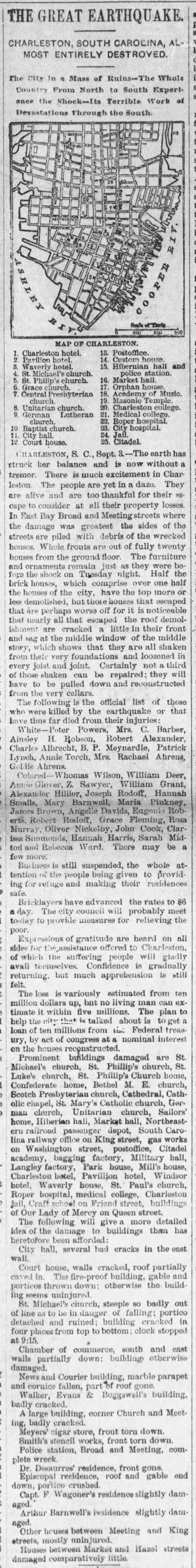
"THE GREAT EARTHQUAKE" The Times and Democrat, Orangeburg, S.C., September 16, 1886

Wires were cut and the railroad tracks were torn apart, cutting residents off from the outside world. The damage was assessed to be between $5 million and $6 million. This would be about $112 million today. In total, there were about 60 deaths from the earthquake. The Charleston earthquake was then followed by a series of aftershocks. It was reported there to be 300 smaller aftershocks within the first 30 years following the earthquake in 1886 and 435 total.

Major damage occurred as far away as Tybee Island, Georgia, which is more than 60 miles away. Structural damage was reported several hundred miles from Charleston, including in central Alabama, central Ohio, eastern Kentucky, southern Virginia and western West Virginia.

Isoseismal map of the Eastern United States contoured to show the more localized variation' in the reported intensities for the 1886 Charleston earthquake. Contoured intensity levels are shown by Arabic numerals

=== Aftermath ===
Many building owners added earthquake bolts to existing unreinforced masonry buildings in order to add support to the structure to avoid having to demolish it because of instability. The bolts pass through the existing masonry walls, tying walls on opposite sides of the structure together for stability. Additionally, the South Carolina Emergency Management Division (SCEMD) has been created to plan disaster mitigation as well as respond to current disasters in order to reduce property damage and save lives.

Local photographer George LaGrange Cook took a series of photographs of the city after the quake, publishing them as Cook's Earthquake Views of Charleston and Vicinity. A collection of his work is held by the Gibbes Museum of Art in the city.

After the initial earthquake, for the next 30 years, there were 435 total aftershocks from the earthquake. Some of these started directly after the earthquake and were more frequent and the longer after the earthquake, the more spaced out the aftershocks were.

The initial shock in Charleston lasted for about 45 seconds and was extremely destructive, leaving nearly all of the 8,000 city structures with either interior damage or broken windows. The first aftershock followed just ten minutes later, and had the city rumbling once again. In the next 24 hours, at least seven different aftershocks were felt in Charleston and its surrounding areas. The earthquake and its aftershocks caused damage to buildings in cities such as Savannah and Augusta, Georgia, as well as Columbia, South Carolina, more than 100 miles from Charleston. The quake was even felt in cities as far as Boston and Chicago, where plaster fell from ceilings in upper floors of some buildings.

It has been estimated that if an earthquake of this size were to occur in the same place today, it would result in an approximately $20 billion loss just in South Carolina, as well as approximately 900 deaths and 44,000 injuries. However, as the earthquakes that have occurred in Charleston are large but infrequent, happening every 500–600 years, it is very unlikely that another earthquake of this size will occur any time soon.

== See also ==
- Geology of the United States
- List of earthquakes in South Carolina
- List of earthquakes in the United States
- List of historical earthquakes
