= Chipola Formation =

Geologic formation in Florida, U.S.

- Stratigraphic range: Late Oligocene-Early Miocene
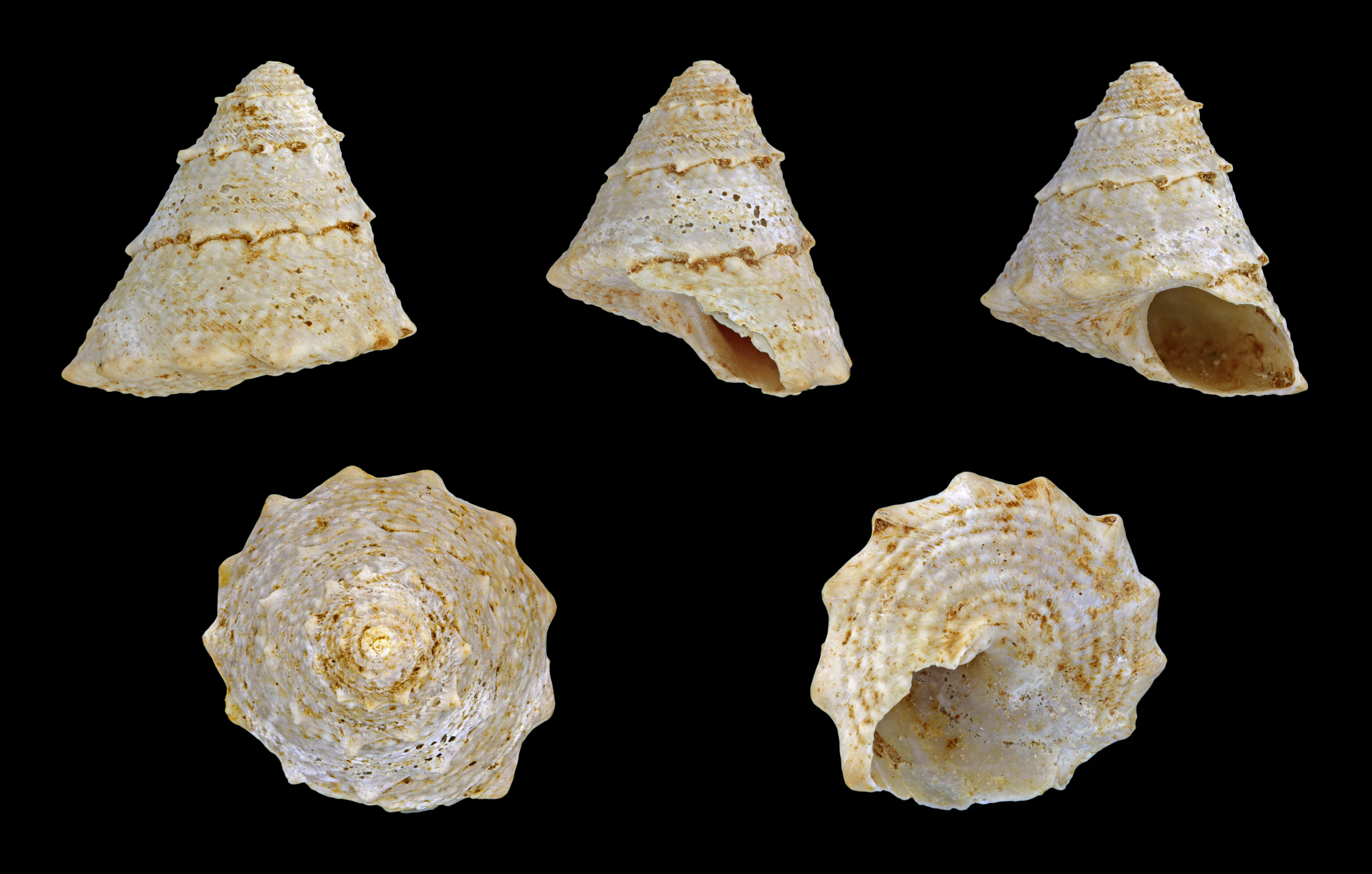
- Fossils from the Chipola Formation
- Type: Geological formation
- Unit of: Alum Bluff Group
- Underlies: Shoal River Formation

Lithology
- Primary: dolomite, phosphate, clay, sand

Location
- Region: Florida Panhandle
- Country: United States

Type section
- Named for: Chipola River

The Chipola Formation is a Late Oligocene to Early Miocene geologic formation in the Florida Panhandle and member of the Alum Bluff Group.

== Age ==
Period: Neogene
Epoch: Early Miocene to Middle Miocene
Faunal stage: Aqitanian ~18.9 to 18.3 mya, calculates to a period of 0.6 million years

== Location ==
The Chipola Formation is found along the Chipola River.

== Lithography ==
The Chipola Formation is composed of clays, sands and shell beds. These vary from fossil bearing sandy clays to sands, clays, and carbonate beds absent of fossil content with glauconite and phosphate mica which is common. The coloration is from cream to olive gray with mottled reddish brown in the weathered sections. The sands are soft and very fine to coarse with sporadic gravel while carbonate lenses are quite hard. Permeability of the sediments are generally low and are part of the intermediate confining unit/aquifer system.

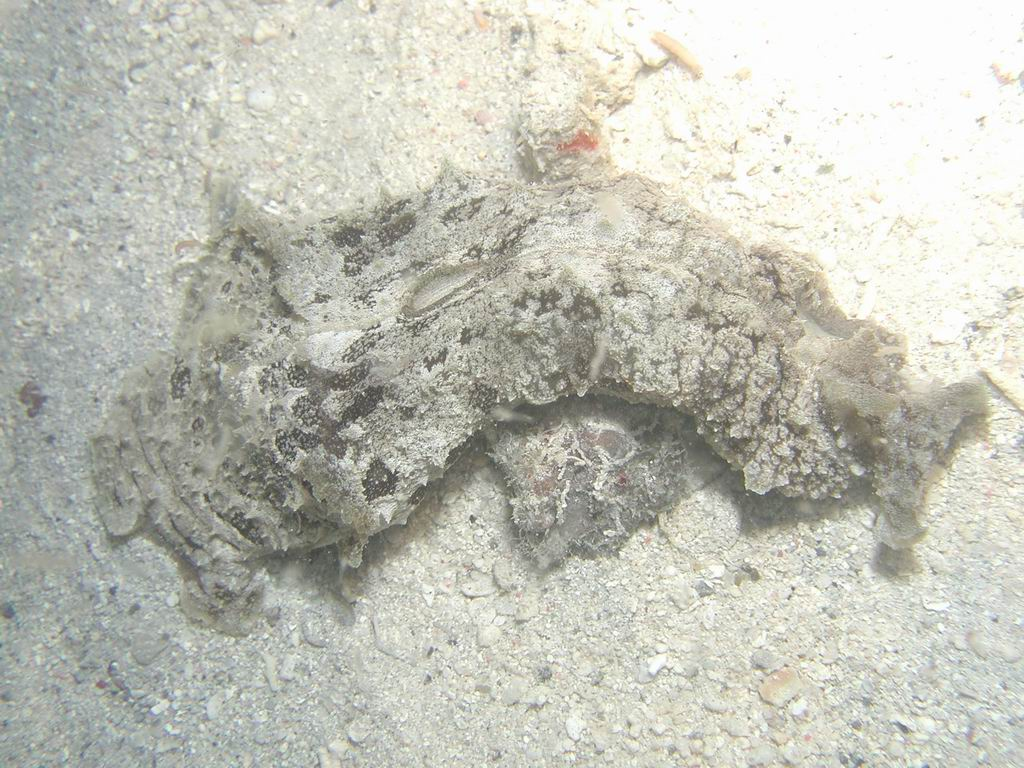
Dolabella auricularia found at Chipola

== Fossil content ==
The Chipola Formation of the Early Miocene contains one of the most diverse, high-abundance ecosystems of mollusks ever described. It contained herbivorous and carnivorous mollusks at 30–50% as well as filter feeders at 7%. The formation was clearly an algae or detritus-based ecosystem not heavily dependent on phytoplankton. Small land-mammal fauna from an overlying unit supports the older age for the Chipola Formation at 18.9–18.3 Ma. (H. Kline et al.).

== See also ==
The Choctaw Sea which gave rise to the Chipola Subsea.
