= Bear Bluff Formation =

Geologic formation in North Carolina, United States

- Stratigraphic range: Neogene
- Type: Formation

Location
- Region: North Carolina
- Country: United States

The Bear Bluff Formation is a geologic formation in North Carolina. It preserves fossils dating back to the Neogene period.

== See also ==
- List of fossiliferous stratigraphic units in North Carolina
