= Waccamaw Formation =

Geologic formation in the United States

- Stratigraphic range: Gelasian
- Type: Formation
- Sub-units: upper, lower

Location
- Region: North Carolina, South Carolina
- Country: United States

Type section
- Named for: Waccamaw River
- Named by: William Healey Dall

The Waccamaw Formation is a geologic formation in southeastern North Carolina and eastern South Carolina. It preserves fossils from the early Pleistocene epoch. The Waccamaw Formation contains two informal members: "upper" and "lower". The upper Waccamaw is ~2.0-1.8 million years old. The lower Waccamaw Formation is ~2.4-2.2 million years old.

The stratigraphic section preserves four transgressive pulses in the lower Waccamaw, and four in the Upper. The maximum sea level preserved is about 65 meters above the current level.

The molluscan fauna is quite diverse, nearly a thousand species have been reported.

== See also ==
- List of fossiliferous stratigraphic units in North Carolina
