= Alum Bluff Group =

Geologic group in Georgia, Florida, and Alabama in the USA

- Stratigraphic range: Neogene
- Type: Group

Location
- Region: Georgia, Florida, Alabama
- Country: United States

The Alum Bluff Group is a geologic group in the states of Georgia, Florida, and Alabama. It preserves fossils dating back to the Neogene period.

== Age ==
Period: Paleogene to Neogene
Epoch: Late Oligocene to Early Miocene
Faunal stage: Chattian through Hemphillian ~23.03–5.33 mya, calculates to a period of 17.7 million years

== Location ==
The Alum Bluff Group replaces the Hawthorn Group west of the Apalachicola River with occurrences in Bay, Calhoun, Holmes, Jackson, Liberty, Okaloosa, Walton, and Washington counties. It is younger than the Torreya Formation to the east based on superpositioning.

The Alum Bluff Group outcrops beneath a thin overburden in the western panhandle from river valleys in Okloosa County eastward to western Jackson County.

== Lithology ==
The group is composed of clays, sands and shell beds. These vary from fossil bearing sandy clays to sands, clays, and carbonate beds absent of fossil content with glauconite and phosphate mica which is common. The coloration is from cream to olive gray with mottled reddish brown in the weathered sections. The sands are soft and very fine to coarse with sporadic gravel while carbonate lenses are quite hard. Permeability of the sediments are generally low and are part of the intermediate confining unit/aquifer system.

== Subdivision ==
The Alum Bluff Group are defined by the stratigraphic position and mollusks contained within. The group includes:

- Chipola Formation
- Oak Grove Sand
- Shoal River Formation
- Choctawhatchee Formation
- Jackson Bluff Formation

The Alum Bluff Group has a residuum on Miocene sediments and undifferentiated sediment of the Miocene. This consists of reddish brown, variably sandy clay with inclusions of variably fossiliferous, silicified limestone. The residuum includes Lower to Upper Miocene and younger weathered sediments.

== Fossils ==
- Mollusks both herbivorous and carnivorous in equal percentages.
- Filter feeders at ~7%

== See also ==
- List of fossiliferous stratigraphic units in Georgia (U.S. state)
- Paleontology in Georgia (U.S. state)
