= Paleontology in South Carolina =

Paleontological research in the U.S. state of South Carolina

The location of the state of South Carolina

Paleontology in South Carolina refers to paleontological research occurring within or conducted by people from the U.S. state of South Carolina. Evidence suggests that at least part of South Carolina was covered by a warm, shallow sea and inhabited by trilobites during the Cambrian period. Other than this, little is known about the earliest prehistory of South Carolina because the Ordovician, Silurian, Devonian, Carboniferous, Permian, Triassic, and Jurassic, are missing from the state's local rock record. The earliest fossils of South Carolina date back to the Cretaceous, when the state was partially covered by seawater. Contemporary fossils include marine invertebrates and the remains of dinosaur carcasses that washed out to sea. On land, a wide variety of trees grew. Sea levels rose and fell throughout the ensuing Cenozoic era. Local marine life included invertebrates, fish, sharks, whales. The first scientifically accurate identification of vertebrate fossils in North America occurred in South Carolina. In 1725, African slaves digging in a swamp uncovered mammoth teeth, which they recognized as originating from an elephant-like animal.

== Prehistory ==
No Precambrian fossils are known from South Carolina. As such, the state's fossil record does not begin until the Paleozoic. During the Cambrian, at least the Batesburg-Leesville area in the southwestern part of the state was submerged under seawater. This sea was home to trilobites. The rest of the Paleozoic is absent from the state's rock record, so the state has no sediments from the Ordovician, Silurian, Devonian, Carboniferous, or Permian in which fossils could have been preserved. The Triassic and Jurassic periods of the Mesozoic era are also missing from the state's rock record. During the Cretaceous, however, South Carolina was covered in sea water. Local marine life included oysters and tube-forming worms. Sometimes whole dinosaur carcasses would be washed out to sea. Fragments of bone and teeth from such remains have been preserved in the eastern part of the state. Late Cretaceous invertebrates included a bryozoan, coelenterates, gastropods, pelecypods, and scaphopods. The Late Cretaceous Peedee beds are known for their belemnites and other mollusks. During the Late Cretaceous, the flora of South Carolina included trees like eucalyptuses, laurel, magnolias, oak, sequoia, walnut, and willows. Similar fossil trees have been found in Alabama, New Jersey, and Maryland. Late Cretaceous dinosaur fossils have been found at several Donoho Creek Formation sites in northeastern South Carolina.

Cenozoic limestone is common in South Carolina and rich in fossils. The state's early Tertiary limestones are a great example. The Tertiary period was a time of rising and falling local temperatures. During the Eocene, South Carolina was home to the corals Coelohelia wagneriana and Haimesiastraea conforta and the oyster Ostrea arrosis. Before the South Carolinan specimens of those corals had been found they were known only from Alabama. At least 58 kinds of Eocene bryozoans were preserved in the Eutaw Springs area alone. Middle Tertiary phosphate beds in the state have produced marine fossils like shark teeth, fish bones, and ray dental plates. Finally in the later part of the Tertiary period the local climate entered a trend of increasing temperatures. This trend culminated in local temperatures similar to those of modern Florida. Local environments included both sea and land. Local marine life included whales. More terrestrial inhabitants of Tertiary South Carolina included sizable crocodilians. During the Oligocene, South Carolina was home to bony fishes, sharks, and rays. A primitive toothed whale called Xenorophus sloanii was preserved in Charleston County. Miocene life of South Carolina included a great diversity of mollusks, who left behind a wide variety of fossil shells. Pliocene life included mollusks and sea urchins. Both local sea levels and temperatures began to rise and fall during the Quaternary. During cold spells jack pines grew in the state while during the warmer spells the vegetation more closely resembled the state's current flora. Pleistocene fossils are fairly rare, except for the abundant marine mollusk shells at the Stono River and Yonges Island.

== History ==
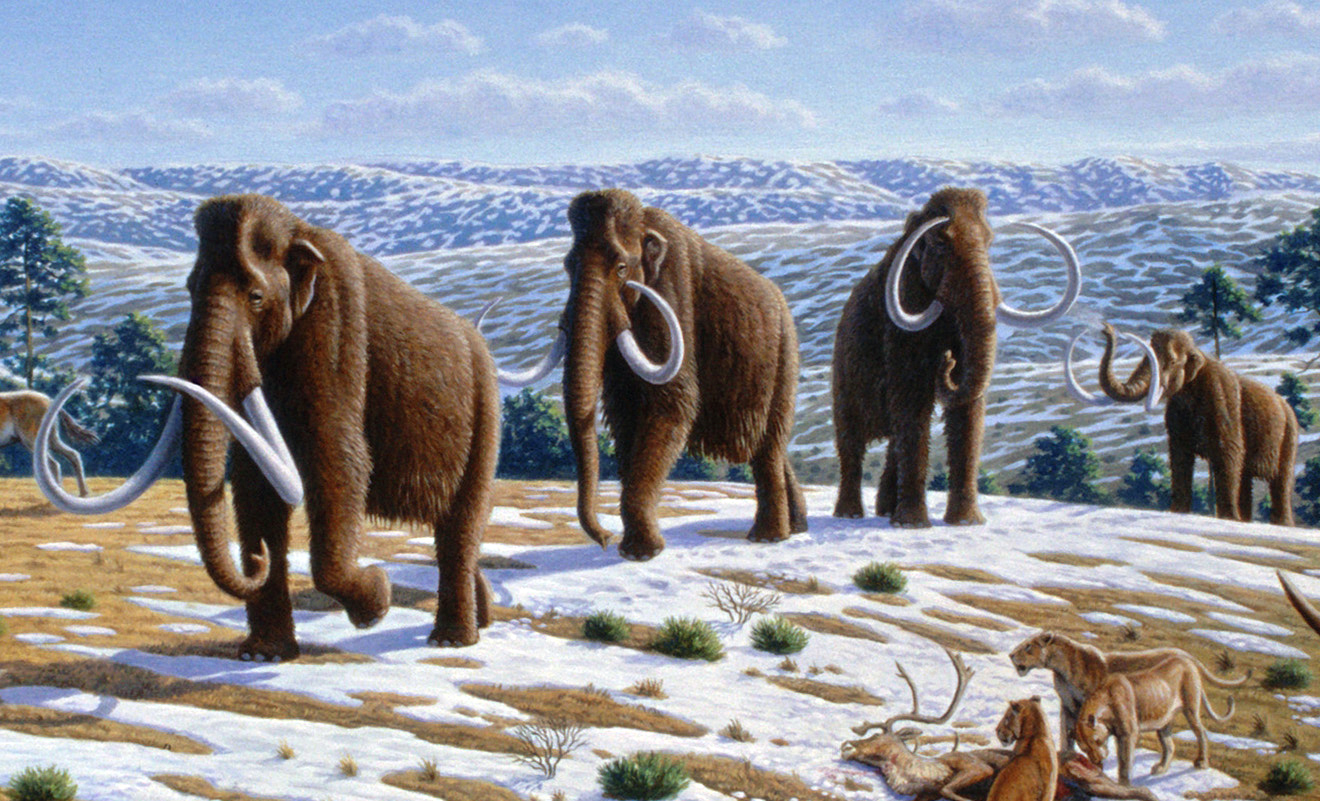
Woolly mammoths.

In 1725, Mark Catesby, an English botanist visited a plantation called Stono, where slaves had uncovered several large fossil teeth while digging in a swamp. The slaves unanimously identified the teeth as elephant molars. The slaves would have been familiar with the modern African elephants of their homeland, probably Angola or Congo. The plantation owners probably would have interpreted the teeth as the remains of giants killed by Noah's Flood. Catesby, however, also interpreted the molars as elephants teeth due to their similarity to African elephant teeth he had seen on display in London. In the early 19th century, Georges Cuvier authored an 1806 translated account of the discovery at Stono. He remarked that the African slaves understood the similarity between mammoth remains and elephants before European naturalists. Later, in 1942, George Gaylord Simpson "grudgingly" conceded that the African slaves at Stono were the first to scientifically identify a North American vertebrate fossil.

== Natural history museums ==
- Bob Campbell Geology Museum, Clemson
- Charleston Museum, Charleston
- McKissick Museum, Columbia
- Mace Brown Museum of Natural History, Charleston
- South Carolina State Museum, Columbia

== Notable clubs and associations ==
- Myrtle Beach Fossil Club

== See also ==
- Paleontology in Georgia
- Paleontology in North Carolina
