= Paraná Formation =

Geologic formation in Argentina

- Stratigraphic range: Late Miocene
- Type: Geological formation

Location
- Region: Entre Ríos Province
- Country: Argentina

Type section
- Named for: Paraná Basin

The Paraná Formation is a geologic formation in Argentina. It preserves fossils dating back to the late Miocene epoch.

== Fossil content ==
Color key: Taxon / Reclassified taxon / Taxon falsely reported as present / Dubious taxon or junior synonym / Ichnotaxon / Ootaxon / Morphotaxon

Notes
Uncertain or tentative taxa are in small text
~~crossed out~~ taxa are discredited.

=== Mammals ===
==== Cetaceans ====
Cetaceans reported from the Paraná Formation
Genus	Species	Presence	Material	Notes	Images
cf. Aulophyseter	cf. A. sp.	Cantera del Puerto Viejo near Paraná, Entre Ríos.	Incomplete tooth (MACN Pv 8926).	Now deemed an indeterminate physeteroid.	
Balaenidae gen. et. sp. indet.	Indeterminate		Right tympanic bulla (MACN Pv 13221).	A balaenid.	
Balaenoptera	B. sp.		Right tympanic bulla (MACN Pv 13220).	A rorqual.	
Balaenopteridae indet.		South Bank of Ensenada Creek.	Cubitus & radius (CICYTTP-PV-1-197) bearing bite marks matching Cosmopolitodus hastalis.	A rorqual.	
Physeteroidea gen. et. sp. indet.	Indeterminate	Cantera del Puerto Viejo near Paraná, Entre Ríos.	An almost complete tooth (MAS Pv 1361) & a fragmentary tooth (MACN Pv 8926).	Previously identified as cf. Aulophyseter sp.	
Platanistoidea indet.			Left tympanic bulla (MACN Pv 15997).	A relative of river dolphins.	
Pontistes	P. rectifrons			A pontoporiid.	
Prionodelphis	P. rovereti		A single tooth.	A dubious delphinoid, other specimens once referred to this taxon are now thought to represent monachine seals.	

==== Pinnipeds ====
Pinnipeds reported from the Paraná Formation
Genus	Species	Presence	Material	Notes	Images
Properiptychus	P. argentinus		Jaw & limb elements.	A monachine seal.	

==== Rodents ====
Rodents reported from the Paraná Formation
Genus	Species	Presence	Material	Notes	Images
cf. Cardiatherium	cf. C. sp. indet.	La Juanita locality.	Left isolated cheek tooth (CICYTTP-PV-M-1-147) & right upper cheek tooth (CICYTTP-PV-M-1-148).	A hydrochoerine.	
Caviidae gen. & sp. indet.	Indeterminate	La Juanita locality.	A left upper M1-2 (CICYTTP-PV-M-2-267).	A cavy.	
Plesiacarechimys	P. nov. sp.?	La Juanita locality.	Right lower molar (CICYTTP-PV-M-1-145).	An octodontoid.	

==== Sirenians ====
Sirenians reported from the Paraná Formation
Genus	Species	Presence	Material	Notes	Images
Dioplotherium	D. sp.	Cliffs along Paraná River, Villa Urquiza.	Upper left molar (CORD-PZ 4301).	A dugongid.	
Metaxytherium	M. sp.	Cerro La Matanza locality, Victoria City.	Posterior end of both maxillae (MASP 373).	A dugongid.	

==== Xenarthrans ====
Xenarthrans reported from the Paraná Formation
Genus	Species	Presence	Material	Notes	Images
Scirrotherium	S. sp. indet.	La Juanita locality.	A fixed osteoderm (CICYTTP-PV-M-1-144).	A pampatheriid.	

=== Birds ===
Birds reported from the Paraná Formation
Genus	Species	Presence	Material	Notes	Images
Pelecanus	P. paranensis	Cerro La Matanza locality, Victoria City.	A nearly complete pelvis (CICYTTP-PV-A-3-277).	A pelican.	
cf. Phoenicopterus	cf. P. sp. indet.	La Juanita locality.	Fragment of shaft with distal end of left tibiotarsus (CICYTTP-PV-A-1-12).	A flamingo.	

=== Fish ===
==== Bony fish ====
Bony fish reported from the Paraná Formation
Genus	Species	Presence	Material	Notes	Images
Siluroidae	Undetermined		Abundant fragmentary specimens.	Evidently represents extant catfish genera.	
Tetraodontidae indet.	Indeterminate	La Juanita & Toma Vieja localities.	Several premaxillary beaks.	Remains of pufferfish.	

==== Rays ====
Rays reported from the Paraná Formation
Genus	Species	Presence	Material	Notes	Images
Dynatobatis	D. paranensis		Dermal tubercles.		
Myliobatis	M. americanus		Detached teeth.		
Raja	R. agassizi		Dermal tubercles.	Moved to the genus Rioraja.	
Rioraja	R. agassizii		Dermal tubercles.	A skate, originally reported as Raja agassizi.	

==== Sharks ====
Sharks reported from the Paraná Formation
Genus	Species	Presence	Material	Notes	Images
Carcharias	C. (Prionodon) obliquidens		Teeth.	Junior synonym of Squalus obliquidens.	
Carcharodon	C. megalodon		Teeth.	Reassigned to the genus Otodus.	
Carcharodon	C. sp.	Arroyo Ensenada valley.	2 teeth (UAP 1301 & 1303).	Related to the great white shark.	
Cestracion	C. paranensis		2 teeth.	Cestracion is now a junior synyonym of Heterodontus.	
Cosmopolitodus	C. hastalis		Several teeth.	A mackerel shark, originally reported as Oxyrhina hastalis.	
Galeocerdo	G. aduncus		Tooth.	A requiem shark.	
Hemipristis	H. serra		A few well-preserved upper teeth.	A large weasel shark.	
Heterodontus	H. paranensis		2 teeth.	A bullhead shark, originally reported as Cestracion paranensis.	
Megascyliorhinus	M. trelewensis	La Juanita locality.	4 anterior teeth.	A ground shark, specimens originally labelled "Squatina".	
Odontaspis	O. elegans		Teeth.		
Otodus	O. megalodon		Teeth.	A megatooth shark, originally reported as Carcharodon megalodon.	
Oxyrhina	O. hastalis		Several teeth.	Reassigned to the genus Cosmopolitodus.	
Squalus	S. obliquidens		Teeth.	Originally reported as Carcharias (Prionodon) obliquidens.	

=== Invertebrates ===
==== Bivalves ====
Bivalves reported from the Paraná Formation
Genus	Species	Presence	Material	Notes	Images
Aequipecten	A. paranensis		Valves.	A scallop.	
Amusium	A. darwinianum			A scallop.	
Erodona	E. doellojuradoi	La Juanita & La Paz.	260 specimens.	An erodonid.	
Flabellipecten	F. oblongus		Valves.	A scallop.	
Polymesoda	P. muravchiki	La Juanita.	13 specimens.	A cyrenid.	

==== Bryozoans ====
Bryozoans reported from the Paraná Formation
Genus	Species	Presence	Material	Notes	Images
Acanthodesia	A. cf. sulcata	Punta Gorda, near Diamante, Entre Ríos.	Fragments of colonies (MLP 13471 to 13476).	A cheilostomatid.	
Microporella	M. sp.	Punta Gorda, near Diamante, Entre Ríos.	Fragments of colonies (MLP 13477 to 13483).	A microporellid.	
Schizoporella	S. sp.	Punta Gorda, near Diamante, Entre Ríos.	Fragments of colonies (MLP 13474, MLP 13484 to 13488).	A schizoporellid.	
Schizoporellidae indet.	Indeterminate	Punta Gorda, near Diamante, Entre Ríos.	Fragments of colonies (MLP 13489).	A schizoporellid.	
Schizosmittina	S. sp.	Punta Gorda, near Diamante, Entre Ríos.	Fragments of colonies (MLP 13486, MLP 13490 to 13492).	A bitectiporid.	
Tubulipora	T. sp.	Punta Gorda, near Diamante, Entre Ríos.	Two colonies (MLP 13493 & MLP 13494).	A tubuliporid.	

==== Echinoderms ====
Echinoderms reported from the Paraná Formation
Genus	Species	Presence	Material	Notes	Images
Abertella	A. sp.			A sand dollar.	
Amplaster	A. alatus			A sand dollar.	
Amplaster	A. ellipticus			A sand dollar.	
Monophoraster	M. duboisi			A sand dollar.	
Neognathostomata	Indeterminate		An immature specimen.	A sea urchin.	
Ophiocoma	O. sp.			A brittle star.	
Ophiothrix	O. sp.			A brittle star.	

=== Plants ===
Plants reported from the Paraná Formation
Genus	Species	Presence	Material	Notes	Images
Astroniumxylon	A. parabalansae	Toma Vieja fossil locality.	Fossil wood.	An anacardiaceaen.	
Laurophyllum	L. sp.	Villa Urquiza.	Leaves.	A lauraceaen.	
Myrciophyllum	M. paranaesianum	Villa Urquiza.	Leaves.	A myrtaceaen.	
Ocotea	O. sp.	Villa Urquiza.	Leaves.	A lauraceaen.	
Piptadenioxylon	P. paraexcelsa	Toma Vieja fossil locality.	Fossil wood.	A mimosoid.	
Schinus	S. aff. terebinthifolius	Villa Urquiza.	Leaves.	An anacardiaceaen.	
Solanumxylon	S. paranensis	Toma Vieja fossil locality.	Fossil wood.	A nightshade.	

== Correlations ==
=== Laventan ===
Laventan correlations in South America
Formation	Honda	Honda	Aisol	Cura-Mallín	Pisco	Ipururo	Pebas	Capadare	Urumaco	Inés	Paraná	Map
Basin	VSM	Honda	San Rafael	Caldera	Pisco	Ucayali	Amazon	Falcón		Venezuela	Paraná	Paraná Formation (South America)
Country	Colombia	Bolivia	Argentina	Chile	Peru			Venezuela			Argentina	Paraná Formation (South America)
Boreostemma												Paraná Formation (South America)
Hapalops												Paraná Formation (South America)
Miocochilius												Paraná Formation (South America)
Theosodon												Paraná Formation (South America)
Xenastrapotherium												Paraná Formation (South America)
Mylodontidae												Paraná Formation (South America)
Sparassodonta												Paraná Formation (South America)
Primates												Paraná Formation (South America)
Rodents												Paraná Formation (South America)
Birds												Paraná Formation (South America)
Terror birds												Paraná Formation (South America)
Reptiles												Paraná Formation (South America)
megalodon												Paraná Formation (South America)
Flora												Paraná Formation (South America)
Insects												Paraná Formation (South America)
Environments	Fluvial			Fluvio-deltaic		Fluvio-lacustrine		Fluvio-deltaic			Fluvial	Laventan volcanoclastics Laventan fauna Laventan flora
Volcanic	Yes											Laventan volcanoclastics Laventan fauna Laventan flora

=== Huayquerian ===
Huayquerian correlations in South America
Formation	Cerro Azul	Ituzaingó	Paraná	Camacho	Raigón	Andalhuala	Chiquimil	Las Flores	Maimará	Palo	Pebas	Muyu	Rosa	Saldungaray	Salicas	Urumaco	Map
Basin	Colorado	Paraná				Hualfín		Tontal	Andes	Salta	Amazon	Huasi	Altiplano	BA	Velasco	Falcón	Paraná Formation (South America)
Country	Argentina			Uruguay		Argentina					Brazil Peru	Bolivia		Argentina		Venezuela	Paraná Formation (South America)
Cardiatherium																	Paraná Formation (South America)
Lagostomus																	Paraná Formation (South America)
Macroeuphractus																	Paraná Formation (South America)
Proeuphractus																	Paraná Formation (South America)
Pronothrotherium																	Paraná Formation (South America)
Pseudotypotherium																	Paraná Formation (South America)
Thylacosmilus																	Paraná Formation (South America)
Xotodon																	Paraná Formation (South America)
Macraucheniidae																	Paraná Formation (South America)
Primates																	Paraná Formation (South America)
Rodents																	Paraná Formation (South America)
Reptiles																	Paraná Formation (South America)
Birds																	Paraná Formation (South America)
Terror birds																	Paraná Formation (South America)
Flora																	Paraná Formation (South America)
Environments	Aeolian-fluvial	Fluvio-deltaic			Fluvial						Fluvio-lacustrine	Fluvial			Fluvio-lacustrine	Fluvio-deltaic	Huayquerian volcanoclastics Huayquerian fauna Huayquerian flora
Volcanic						Yes											Huayquerian volcanoclastics Huayquerian fauna Huayquerian flora
