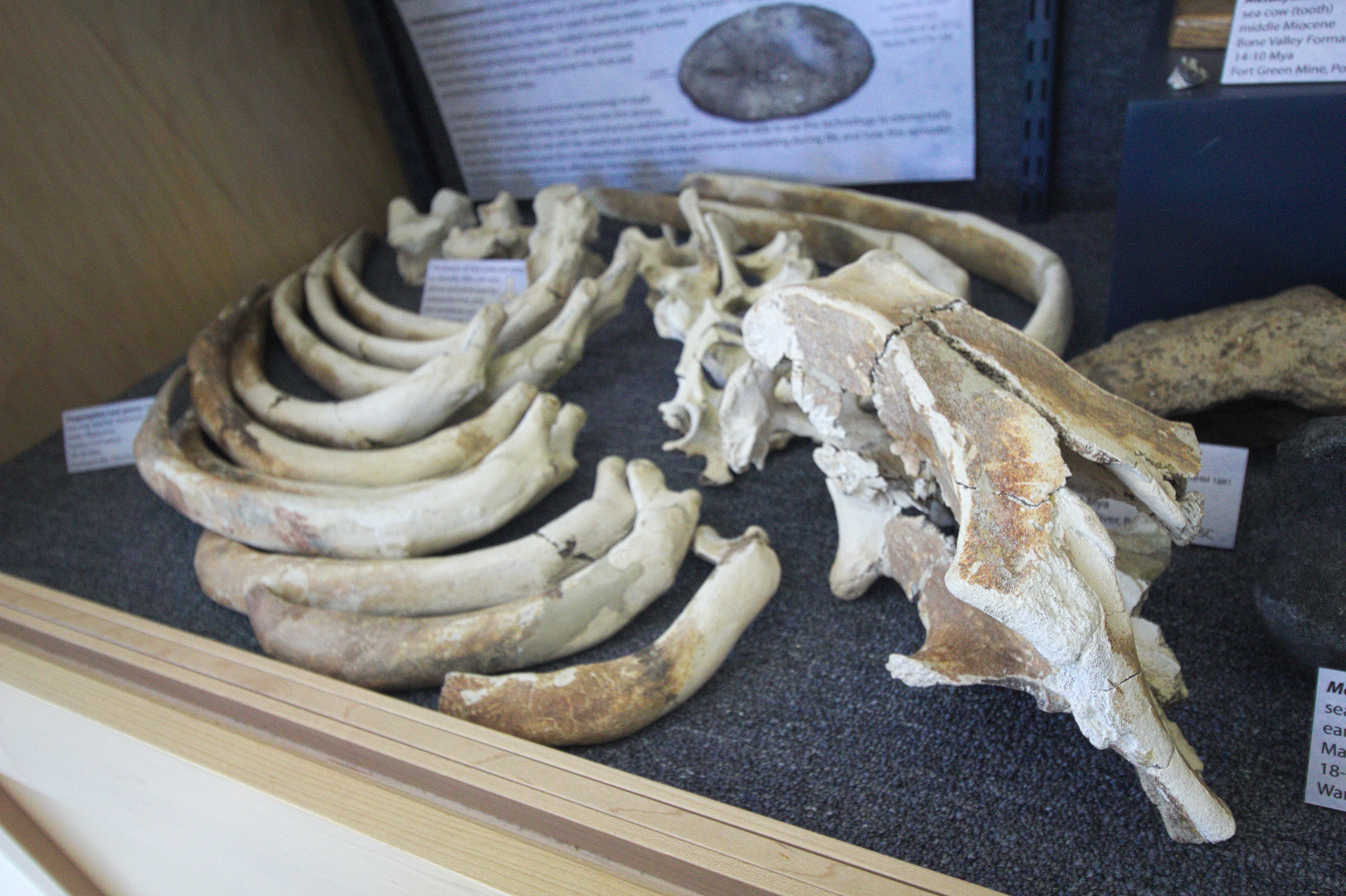
- Stegosiren skeleton at Mace Brown Museum of Natural History

Scientific classification
- Kingdom: Animalia
- Phylum: Chordata
- Class: Mammalia
- Order: Sirenia
- Family: Dugongidae
- Genus: †Stegosiren

= Stegosiren =

Stegosiren Temporal range: Rupelian to Chattian ~30–24 Ma

Early sea cow from the Middle Oligocene of South Carolina

Stegosiren was an early sea cow from the Middle Oligocene of South Carolina, US. It shows a stage of halitheriine evolution more derived than that of the Old World early Oligocene Eosiren imenti and Halitherium schinzii.

== Location ==
Fossils of Stegosiren are known from the Middle Oligocene of South Carolina, US.

As of March 2021, the addition of Stegosiren macei to the list of potentially sympatric sirenian species lineages known from the West Atlantic-Caribbean Oligocene brought the total number of those to at least seven.

== Description ==
The species is from the Ashley and Chandler Bridge Formations in South Carolina (late Rupelian–late Chattian) and reflect a stage of halitheriine evolution more derived than that of the Old World early Oligocene Eosiren imenti and Halitherium schinzii, but slightly less derived than the West Atlantic late Oligocene Metaxytherium albifontanum. Its early Oligocene contemporaries Caribosiren turneri and Priscosiren atlantica are more similar in stage of evolution, and it may be a sister taxon to these two. Stegosiren is differentiated from all other sirenians by a noticeably broadened head.

Ecomorphology and feeding-niche partitioning are complicated by the sirenian diversity.

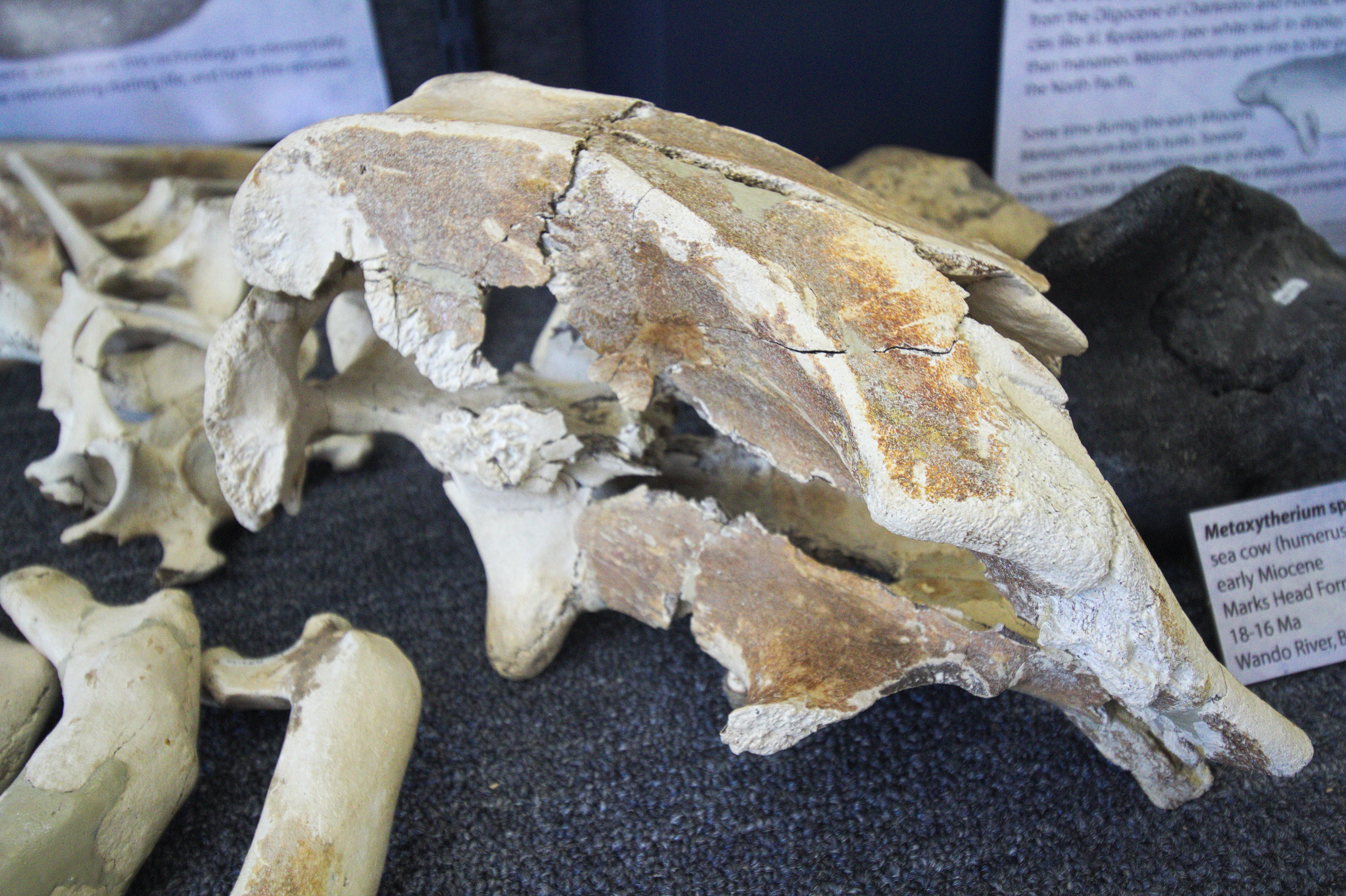
Stegosiren skull at Mace Brown Museum of Natural History

== See also ==
- Evolution of sirenians
