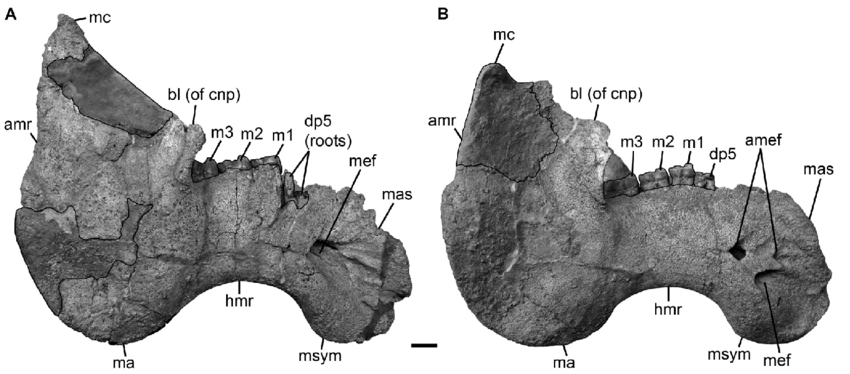
- Lectotype mandible of Lentiarenium

Scientific classification
- Kingdom: Animalia
- Phylum: Chordata
- Class: Mammalia
- Order: Sirenia
- Family: Dugongidae
- Genus: †Lentiarenium; Voss et al., 2016

Species
- L. cristolii (Fitzinger, 1842) (type)

= Lentiarenium =

Lentiarenium Temporal range: Late Oligocene ~28–23 Ma

Lentiarenium was an early sea cow from the Late Oligocene (Chattian) Linz-Melk Formation of Austria. Known since the mid 19th century, Lentiarenium was long considered to be a species of Halitherium until a 2016 analysis showed it to be distinct.

== History and naming ==
The earliest discoveries of Lentiarenium date to the early 19th century, with a mandible, ribs, vertebrae and molars being found in sandpits of the city of Linz. Following communication between several researchers across multiple Austrian institutions, the remains were correctly identified as belonging to an extinct species of seacow by paleontologist Leopold Fitzinger, who would go on to describe the material in 1842. Fitzinger believed the bones to belong to the sirenian Halitherium, described by Johann Jakob Kaup just four years prior. At the time of its description, it was thought to be the only sirenian of the area surrounding Linz. However additional finds from Upper Austria were made following these discoveries, with several new species being named. Hermann von Meyer later included the material from Linz in his genus Halianassa, creating the species Halianassa collini. Franz Toula erected the species Metaxytherium (?) pergense based on a skull roof discovered around Perg in 1899. This species in particular would fluctuate, being placed with H. cristolii by Othenio Abel in 1904 before being raised to a distinct species as H. pergense by Franz Spillmann. Yet another revision followed during the 1990s, when Daryl P. Domning suggested that all three species represent a single taxon, which in light of its seniority should be Halitherium cristolii.

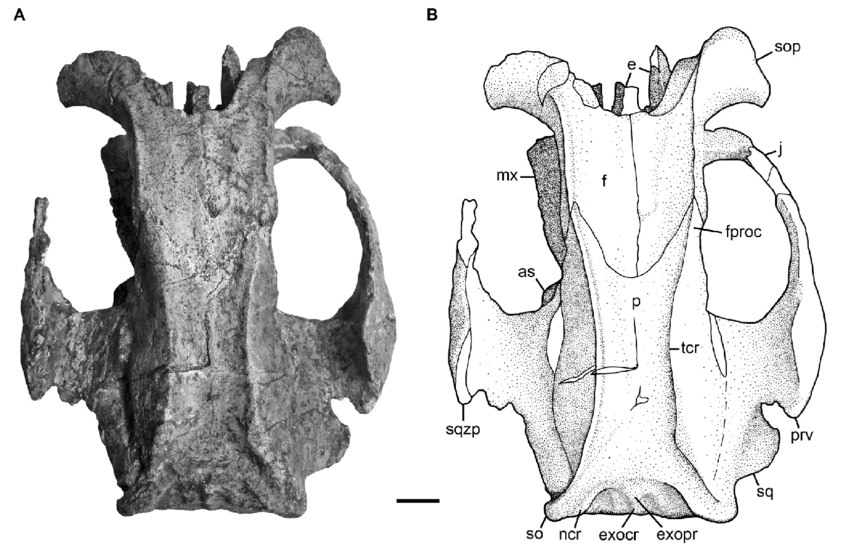
Lentiarenium cristolii cranium in dorsal view

However, the assignment of the material to Halitherium became increasingly problematic due to the nature of the genus and its long and complex history. Over time Halitherium had become a wastebasket taxon for many otherwise unrelated sirenians that thrived in the sea that covered Europe throughout the Neogene. Additionally, the stability of Halitherium itself is questionable, as its type species, H. schinzii, was based on a single isolated tooth found to have no diagnostic value, thus rendering the genus a nomen dubium. This led to a rash of reexaminations of Halitherium remains in the subsequent years, resulting in many specimens being given their own genera. Besides Lentiarenium, this included Kaupitherium (Halitherium bronni) and Italosiren (Halitherium bellunense).

As part of this spike in research; Voss, Berning and Reiter published their examination of the upper Austrian seacow material in 2016, with the express goal to test Domning's synonymisation of H. christolli, H. abeli and H. pergense. The team concludes that the synonymy is justified and that there is no evidence for the three previously named taxa representing morphospecies. Given the dubious nature of Halitherium, the genus Lentiarenium was coined with L. cristolii continuing to serve as the type species. As the type species was described on a series of syntypes, Voss and colleagues chose OLL 2012/1, a complete mandible, as the genus' lectotype.

=== Etymology ===
The name Lentiarenium is composed of "Lentis", the Latin name for the city of Linz, and "arenium" meaning sand, ultimately a direct translation of Linz Sands, the informal name of the sediments the material was found in. When describing the type species, Fitzinger believed that Halitherium (named by Kaup in 1838) and Metaxytherium (named by de Christol in 1840) were synonymous. While assigning the species to the older name, he chose to honor Jules de Christol by naming the species after him. However, despite being named after de Christol, Fitzinger spells the genus name "cristolii". Regardless of intent, Voss and colleagues propose that this spelling takes priority over subsequent spellings such as “christoli” and “christolii”, arguing that Fitzinger's continued use of the species name in later publications rules out printing errors or a one-time mistake.

== Description ==
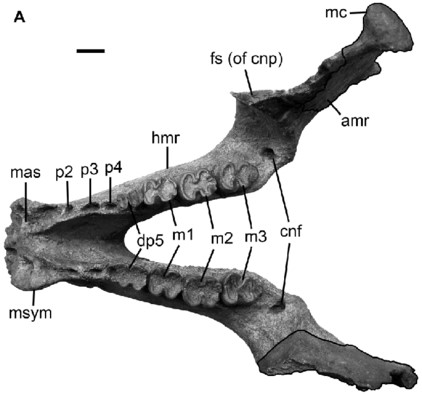
Lentiarenium cristolii Mandible in occlusal view

Lentiarenium is known from both cranial and postcranial remains that amount to most of the skeleton except for the premaxilla, lacrimal bones, forearms and hands. The nares are enlarged like in all sirenians and moved back, their posterior margin reaching beyond the front-most edge of the orbits. The frontal bone is flat between the two temporal crests with no knobs or bosses like observed in Crenatosiren. The temporal crest extends over the frontal and parietal bone and forms a distinct keel. Like the frontal, the parietal is flat between the crests with a marked constriction that reaches its strongest point just behind the center of the skull roof. The frontal extends far into the parietal and there is no developed sagittal crest. The zygomatic arch is long relative to Hydrodamalis. The posterior section of this bridge is thickened and unlike in hydrodamalines it is raised only slightly above the tooth row. The mandibular symphysis of the lower jaw is broad and contains the alveoli of the vestigial canines and incisors. The mandibular symphysis is higher than it is long and on each side the bone bears a mental foramen. Above and behind the foramen are two accessory foramina of smaller size, but larger compared to those seen in "Halitherium" taulannense. The lower boundary of the mandible is strongly concave with the symphysis curving down at a 60° angle (which suggest a deflection of about 50° for the premaxilla). This differs from species previously combined under Halitherium schinzii, which only have a weakly concave mandibular symphysis prior to the downturn. The exact tooth formula is unknown as no fully preserved premaxilla have been discovered. Subsequently, the presence of tusk-like incisors, used to uproot seagrasses in other genera, cannot be confirmed nor ruled out. The second and third incisors likely lacked given other sirenias, as are the upper canines. The upper jaw further contains three permanent premolars, one deciduous premolar and 3 molars. The lower jaw preserves the vestigial remains of the first three incisors and a single canine on each side, followed by the same amount of premolars and molars as the upper jaw. The presence of premolar alveoli alongside fully erupted molar teeth indicates that the animals were young adults. However, despite the presence of observable premolar alveoli, the molars already show that they were in use, which differs from modern dugongs which shed their premolars before their permanent cheek teeth become functional. Several extinct but more derived genera (including Metaxytherium) also show this modern mode of tooth replacement.

== Phylogeny ==
Phylogenetic analysis have repeatedly shown that Lentiarenium was a derived sirenian compared to other Oligocene and Eocene taxa, but basal to the clade that contains modern dugongs, hydrodamalines, the various Metaxytherium species and Caribosiren. Analysis also find that Lentiarenium does not clade together with other "Halitherium" species, further supporting its status as a distinct genus. The following phylogenetic tree was recovered by Vélez-Juarbe & Domning in their description of Metaxytherium albifontanum:

- - Proboscidea
  - - Desmostylia
    - Sirenia
      - Prorastomidae
      - - Protosirenidae
        - - Trichechidae
          - Dugongidae
            - - Eotheroides aegyptiacum
              - Halitherium taulannense
            - - Halitherium schinzii
              - - Halitherium christolii (=Lentiarenium)
                - - Caribosiren turneri
                  - - USNM 542417
                    - - - Metaxytherium krahuletzi
                        - - Metaxytherium albifontanum
                          - - Metaxytherium crataegense
                            - - Metaxytherium medium
                              - - Metaxytherium floridanum
                                - - - Metaxytherium serresii
                                    - Metaxytherium subapenninum
                                  - Hydrodamalinae
                                    - Dusisiren jordani
                                    - Hydrodamalis cuestae
                      - Dugonginae

An alternate hypothesis places Lentiarenium as a dugongid basal to both Caribosiren and Priscosiren. Although Voss and colleagues deem this less likely given the fossil record (as both taxa are from the West Atlantic), it still shows that the genus is neither close to Metaxytherium nor does it nest with other species and genera previously lumped together in Halitherium. A tree such as this has been recovered by Kerber and Moraes–Santos (2021).

- Sirenia
  - Trichechidae
  - Dugongidae
    - Kaupitherium bronni
    - Kaupitherium grolli
    - - Lentiarenium christolii
      - - Caribosiren turneri
        - Priscosiren atlantica
        - - - - Metaxytherium krahuletzi
              - - Metaxytherium albifontanum
                - - Metaxytherium crataegense
                  - Metaxytherium medium
                  - Metaxytherium floridanum
                  - - Metaxytherium serresii
                    - Metaxytherium subapenninum
                  - - Metaxytherium arctodites
                    - - Dusisiren jordani
                      - - Dusisiren dewana
                        - - Dusisiren cuestae
                          - Hydrodamalis gigas
            - Dugonginae

== See also ==
- Evolution of sirenians
