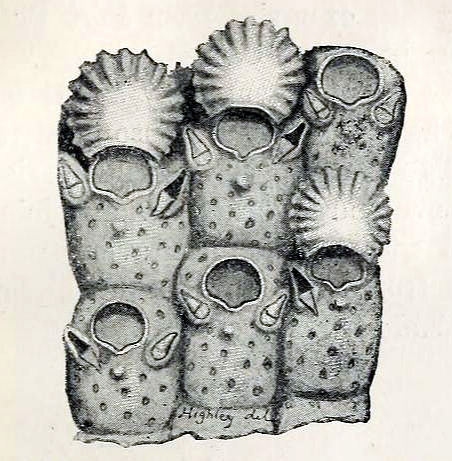

Scientific classification
- Kingdom: Animalia
- Phylum: Bryozoa
- Class: Gymnolaemata
- Order: Cheilostomatida
- Family: Schizoporellidae
- Genus: Schizoporella
- Species: S. unicornis

Binomial name
- Schizoporella unicornis (Johnston in Wood, 1844)

= Schizoporella unicornis =

Species of moss animal

Schizoporella unicornis is a species of bryozoans in the family Schizoporellidae.

== Distribution ==
The native range of Schizoporella unicornis is currently considered to be the Northern Atlantic Ocean in both Europe and North America. It is considered to have been introduced in the Pacific Ocean–in North America, Japan, and Australia–and the South Atlantic Ocean along Brazil.

== Ecology ==
In Brazil, where Schizoporella unicornis is considered introduced, S. unicornis may serve as nursery habitat for multiple small brachyuran crab species. Other crustaceans, polychaetes, and echinoderms may also utilize S. unicornis structures for habitat. Boring sipunculids and bivalves utilize dead S. unicornis colony layers for habitat, as species in this genus are known to grow their colonies with new adventitious zooids growing on top of a previous zooid layer.
