= Pelecanus paranensis =

Pelecanus paranensis Temporal range: Late Miocene (Tortonian-Messinian)
- Paleoart of Pelecanus paranensis

Scientific classification
- Kingdom: Animalia
- Phylum: Chordata
- Class: Aves
- Order: Pelecaniformes
- Family: Pelecanidae
- Genus: Pelecanus
- Species: †P. paranensis

Binomial name
- †Pelecanus paranensis Noriega, Cenizo, Brandoni, Pérez, Tineo, Diederie & Bona, 2023

Extinct species of bird

Pelecanus paranensis is a fossil pelican from the Upper Miocene of the Paraná Formation, in Entre Ríos Province, Argentina. It is the first fossil pelican described from Argentina and the southernmost to be reported from South America.

== Discovery and naming ==
Pelecanus paranensis is known from a nearly complete pelvis, CICYTTP-PV-A-3-277 (the holotype specimen), which was found in the Cerro La Matanza locality in Victoria City, Entre Ríos Province, Argentina. The specific name refers to the Paraná Formation, the stratigraphic provenance of the specimen.

== Size ==
The known specimen of P. paranensis falls within the size range of extant great white, Australian, American white and Peruvian pelicans. It is smaller than the Dalmatian pelican but larger than the pink-backed, spot-billed and brown pelicans.

== Classification and evolutionary history ==
P. paranensis exhibits derived characteristics shared with the extant brown and Peruvian pelicans, suggesting it belongs in the New World pelican clade and is closely related to these two species, whilst the American white pelican is a sister taxon to the clade including the aforementioned three species. Because the oldest known fossil pelican, Eopelecanus, is found in Egypt, and the closest relatives of pelicans (Scopidae and Balaenicipitidae) are also restricted to Africa, pelicans likely first emerged in Africa before spreading to other continents. Whilst pelicans are traditionally believed to have colonized the Americas in an eastward direction from Eurasia, the presence of P. paranensis in late Miocene South America along with its relationship to the New World clade may instead indicate the common ancestor of the New World pelicans reached South America via trans-Atlantic dispersal from Africa after diverging from the Old World clade.

== Paleoenvironment ==
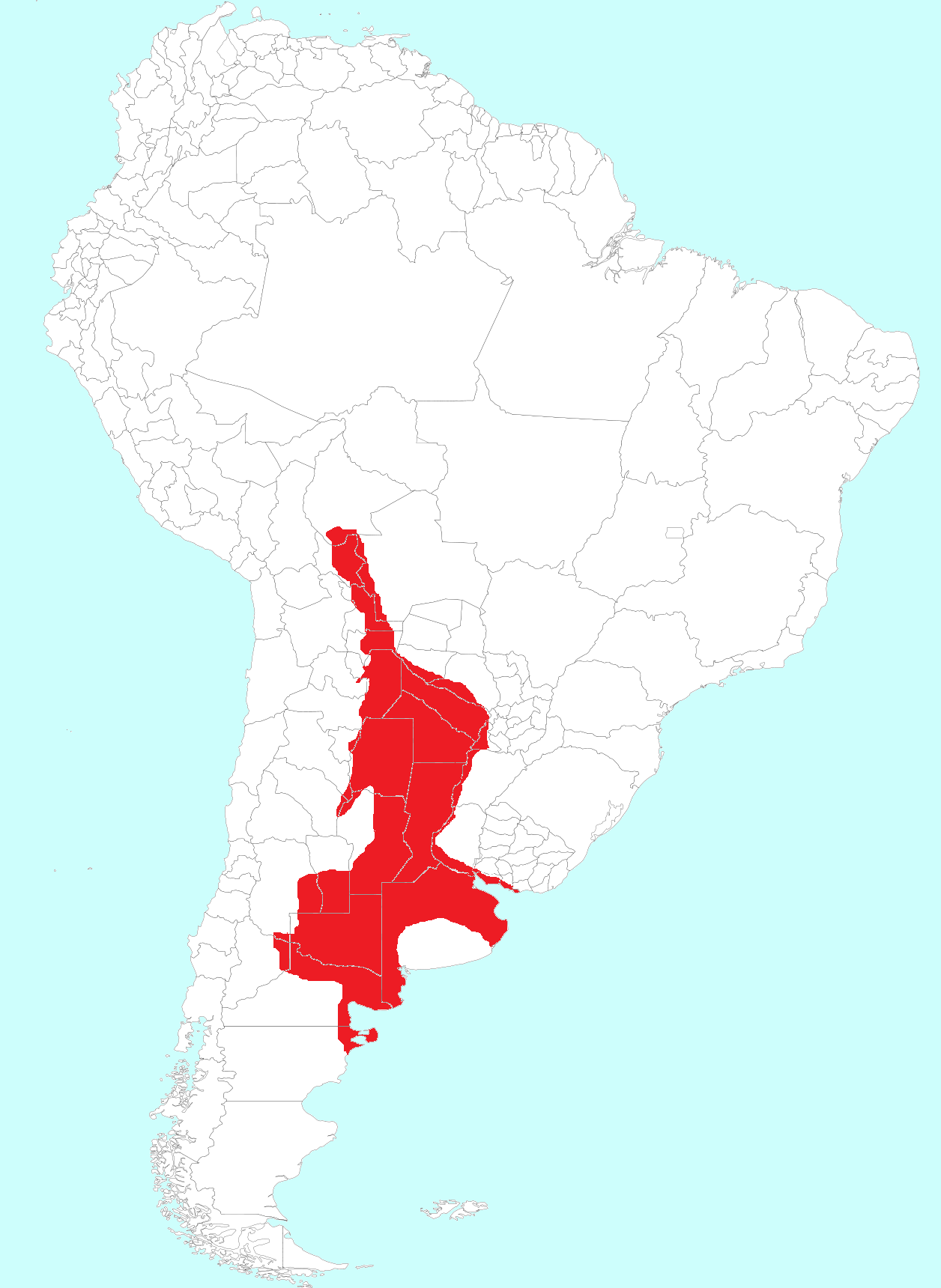
Map of South America, illustrating the extent of the Paranaense Sea during the late Miocene in red

The sediments of the Paraná Formation where P. paranensis was found represents littoral to marine facies of the Paranaense Sea, a shallow inland sea which covered parts of Argentina, Bolivia, Uruguay, Paraguay and southern Brazil in the middle and late Miocene. A diverse fauna of marine life is known from the formation, including rays and sharks such as Cosmopolitodus hastalis, Otodus megalodon, Hemipristis serra and Megascyliorhinus trelewensis, as well as physeteroid cetaceans. Continental vertebrates have also been found in the Paraná Formation, including the rodents Plesiacarechimys and Cardiatherium, the pampatheriid Scirrotherium and an indeterminate flamingo of the genus Phoenicopterus.

== See also ==
- List of bird species described in the 2020s
