= Flustramorpha =

Scientific classification
- Kingdom: Animalia
- Phylum: Bryozoa
- Class: Gymnolaemata
- Order: Cheilostomatida
- Family: Microporellidae
- Genus: Flustramorpha; Gray, 1872

Genus of bryozoans

Flustramorpha is a genus of bryozoans belonging to the family Microporellidae.

The species of this genus are found in Southernmost Africa.

Species:

- Flustramorpha angusta Hayward & Cook, 1979
- Flustramorpha flabellaris (Busk, 1854)
- Flustramorpha marginata (Krauss, 1837)
