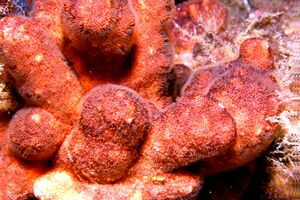
- Schizobrachiella sanguinea

Scientific classification
- Kingdom: Animalia
- Phylum: Bryozoa
- Class: Gymnolaemata
- Order: Cheilostomatida
- Family: Schizoporellidae
- Genus: Schizobrachiella; Canu & Bassler, 1920

= Schizobrachiella =

Genus of bryozoans

Schizobrachiella is a genus of bryozoans belonging to the family Schizoporellidae.

The species of this genus are found in Europe, Australia, North America.

Species:

- Schizobrachiella alata (MacGillivray, 1895)
- Schizobrachiella andegavensis Canu & Lecointre, 1928
- Schizobrachiella arawakensis Winston & Jackson, 2021
- Schizobrachiella candida (Stimpson, 1854)
- Schizobrachiella convergens Harmer, 1957
- Schizobrachiella granosoporosa (Reuss, 1874)
- Schizobrachiella hexagonalis Canu & Bassler, 1935
- Schizobrachiella porosa (Verrill, 1879)
- Schizobrachiella sanguinea (Norman, 1868)
- Schizobrachiella stylifera Levinsen, 1886
- Schizobrachiella verrilli (Maturo & Schopf, 1968)
