= Stylopoma =

Scientific classification
- Kingdom: Animalia
- Phylum: Bryozoa
- Class: Gymnolaemata
- Order: Cheilostomatida
- Family: Schizoporellidae
- Genus: Stylopoma; Levinsen, 1909

Genus of bryozoans

Stylopoma is a genus of bryozoans belonging to the family Schizoporellidae.

The genus has almost cosmopolitan distribution.

Species:

- Stylopoma amboyna Tilbrook, 2001
- Stylopoma aurantiacum Canu & Bassler, 1928
- Stylopoma carioca Winston, Vieira & Woollacott, 2014
- Stylopoma consobrina Tilbrook, 2006
- Stylopoma corallinum Rodrigues, Almeida & Vieira, 2020
- Stylopoma curvabile Tilbrook, 2001
- Stylopoma distorta Canu & Bassler, 1929
- Stylopoma duboisii (Audouin, 1826)
- Stylopoma faceluciae Rodrigues, Almeida & Vieira, 2020
- Stylopoma falcifera (Canu & Bassler, 1928)
- Stylopoma farleyensis Di Martino, Taylor & Portell, 2017
- Stylopoma fastigatum Tilbrook, 2001
- Stylopoma frater Tilbrook, 2001
- Stylopoma granulata Canu & Bassler, 1924
- Stylopoma hastata Ramalho, Taylor. & Moraes, 2018
- Stylopoma haywardi Winston & Woollacott, 2009
- Stylopoma herodias Hayward & Ryland, 1995
- Stylopoma horarium Tilbrook, 2006
- Stylopoma inchoans Tilbrook, 2000
- Stylopoma incomptum Tilbrook, 2001
- Stylopoma informata (Lonsdale, 1845)
- Stylopoma lacrima Tilbrook, 2001
- Stylopoma leverhulme Di Martino, Taylor & Portell, 2017
- Stylopoma magniporosa Canu & Bassler, 1923
- Stylopoma magnistilla Tilbrook, 2001
- Stylopoma magnovicellata Silén, 1954
- Stylopoma mauritiana Tilbrook, 2001
- Stylopoma minutum Canu & Bassler, 1923
- Stylopoma multiavicularia Rodrigues, Almeida & Vieira, 2020
- Stylopoma novum Tilbrook, 2001
- Stylopoma palmula Tilbrook, 2001
- Stylopoma projecta Canu & Bassler, 1923
- Stylopoma robusta L.
- Stylopoma robusta L.u.Yang, 1981
- Stylopoma rotundum Winston, Vieira & Woollacott, 2014
- Stylopoma schizostoma (MacGillivray, 1869)
- Stylopoma sinuata Rodrigues, Almeida & Vieira, 2020
- Stylopoma sloanei Winston & Jackson, 2021
- Stylopoma smitti Winston, 2005
- Stylopoma spongites (Pallas, 1766)
- Stylopoma thornelyi (Livingstone, 1926)
- Stylopoma timorensis Tilbrook, 2001
- Stylopoma variabilis Ramalho, Taylor. & Moraes, 2018
- Stylopoma varus Tilbrook, 2001
- Stylopoma velatum Tilbrook, 2001
- Stylopoma vilaensis Tilbrook, 2001
- Stylopoma viride (Thornely, 1905)
- Stylopoma warkhalensis Sonar & Badve, 2019
