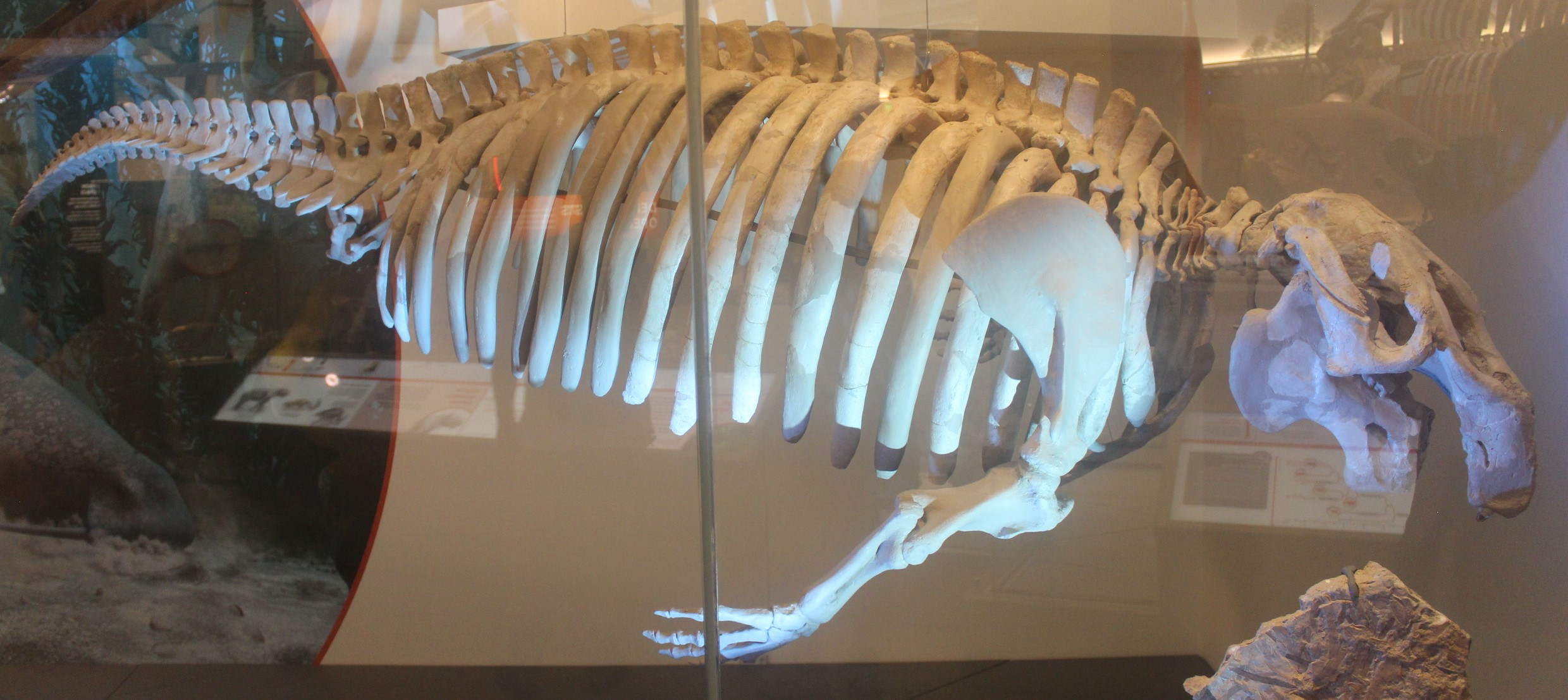
- Metaxytherium floridanum hypotype (USNM 244477), National Museum of Natural History
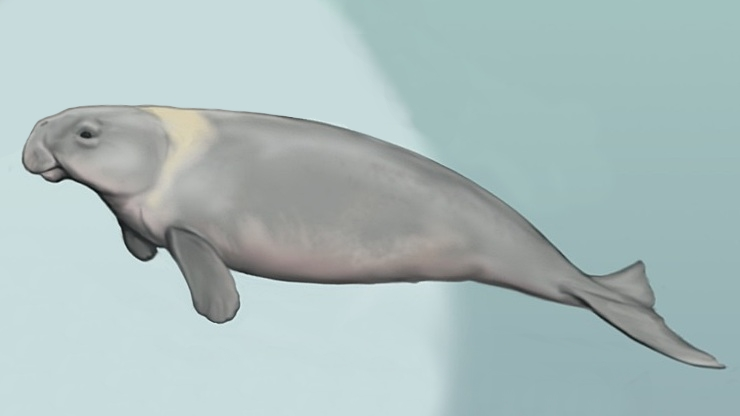
- Life restoration of M. albifontanum

Scientific classification
- Kingdom: Animalia
- Phylum: Chordata
- Class: Mammalia
- Order: Sirenia
- Family: Dugongidae
- Genus: †Metaxytherium; De Christol 1840

Species
- M. albifontanum Vélez Juarbe & Domning 2014; M. arctodites Aranda Manteca et al. 1994; M. crataegense Simpson 1932; M. floridanum Hay 1922; M. krahuletzi Depéret 1895; M. medium Demarest 1822 (type); M. serresii Gervais 1847; M. subapenninum Bruno 1839

= Metaxytherium =

Metaxytherium Temporal range: Late Oligocene-Late Pliocene ~25.7–3 Ma

Extinct genus of dugong

Metaxytherium is an extinct genus of dugong that lived from the Oligocene until the end of the Pliocene. Fossil remains have been found in Africa, Europe, North America and South America. Generally marine seagrass specialists, they inhabited the warm and shallow waters of the Paratethys, Mediterranean, Caribbean Sea and Pacific coastline. American species of Metaxytherium are considered to be ancestral to the North Pacific family Hydrodamalinae, which includes the giant Steller's sea cow.

== Discovery and naming ==
The first remains of Metaxytherium were described in 1822 by Anselme-Gaëtan Demarest as a species of Hippo, H. medius before the genus name Metaxytherium was coined in 1840 by De Christol. Although the type species was initially designated to be M. cuvieri, later publications argued that the two species are synonymous and M. medium thus holds precedence. The grammatical changes of the species name were made to match the rules of the International Code of Zoological Nomenclature (ICZN).

M. serresii was introduced by Gervais in 1847 to encompass the Metaxytherium finds made in Montpellier, France from the Early Pliocene. Although he later described and figured multiple specimens, no type specimen was ever introduced. M. floridanum was named in 1922 by Oliver P. Hay based on a piece of a right maxilla discovered 11 years prior near Mulberry, Florida. The genus Thalattosiren, described by Sickenberg in 1928, was erected from remains previously named M. pettersi, however, further research concluded that it should not only be synonymous with Metaxytherium on a genus level, but is also indistinguishable from M. medium as a species. M. arctodites was named in 1994 by Aranda-Manteca, Domning and Barnes based on three specimens found in California and Baja California, constituting the first valid record of this genus from the north-eastern Pacific. The most recently described species is Metaxytherium albifontanum, described in 2014 by Jorge Vélez-Juarbe and Daryl P. Domning.

The name Metaxytherium means "in-between beast" or "intermediate beast" from the Greek μεταξύ (metaxy) and θηρίον (therion). The name derives from the original interpretation of it being an intermediate form between dugongs and manatees.

There are several genera that are now synonymous with Metaxytherium, including Thalattosiren, Halianassa, Felsinoitherium, Cheirotherium and Hesperosiren. Several species previously considered distinct have likewise been synonymized with already established Metaxytherium species.

== Species ==
- M. albifontanum

Described in 2014, this species inhabited what is now Florida and South Carolina during the late Oligocene. The species name "albifontanum" is a composite of the Latin "albus" (=white) and "fontanus" (=of a spring), a name chosen due to the holotype being discovered near White Springs, Florida. More specifically, M. albifontanum was discovered in the Porters Landing Member of the Parachucla Formation and the Chandler Bridge Formation of South Carolina (25.7-23.6 Ma). It is the stratigraphically oldest species of Metaxytherium and relatively small, with a body size of 2 to 3 meters.

- M. arctodites

M. arctodites is found in mid Miocene (15 - 14 Ma) layers of California and Baja California, specifically the Topanga Formation and Rosarito Beach Formation. The name is a combination of the Greek "arktos" and "hodites", in combination translating to "north traveler", an allusion to the genus dispersal northward as evidenced by M. arctodites. The authors further note that the genus name Metaxytherium (intermediate beast) coincidentally also works as an allusion to it being a bridge between the Halitheriinae and Hydrodamalinae. This species may have been less shorebound than other Metaxytherium, found in true marine sediments alongside mysticete whales, toothed whales and pelagic sharks.

- M. crataegense

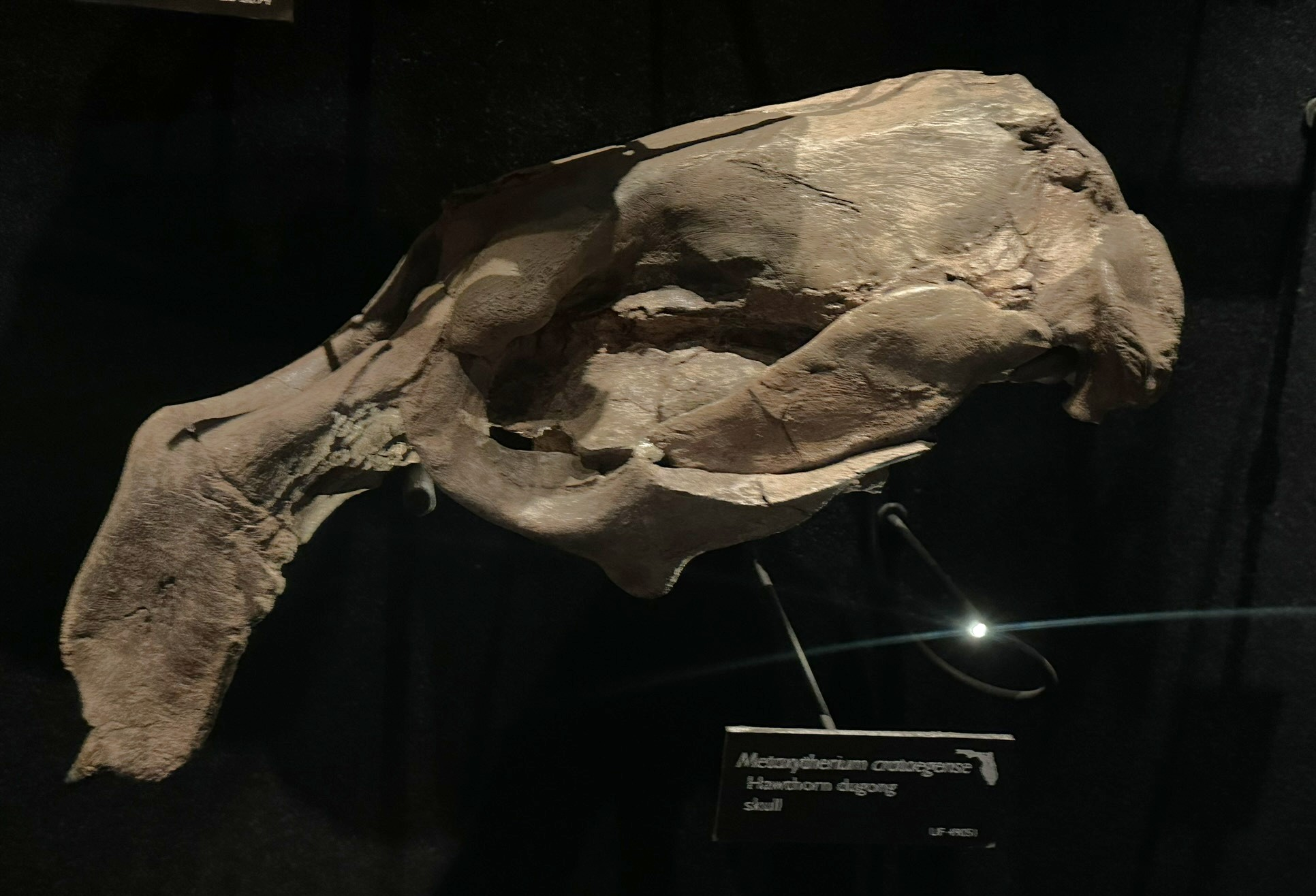
M. crataegense skull cast, Florida Museum of Natural History

A West-Atlantic species found in the early to middle Miocene Montera Formation of Peru as well as the Hawthorne and Calvert formations of the United States, extending its range from western South America to the north-east of the United States. M. crataegense existed from the approximately late Hemingfordian (ca. 20.44 Ma) to the early Barstovian (ca. 13.6 Ma). The two species M. calvertense and M. riveroi from Cuba have both been sunk into this species as well.

- M. floridanum

Named after the state of Florida, M. floridanum is found in the middle to late Miocene rock layers of northern and central Florida with many remains being found in the phosphate mines of Central Florida, belonging to the Lower Bone Valley Formation. M. floridanum remains specifically date to the Late Barstovian to Early Hemphillian age (14-7 Ma). It reached a length of approximately 3 meters.

- M. krahuletzi

M. krahuletzi is the oldest species of Metaxytherium known from Europe, inhabiting the shallow waters of the Central Paratethys as well as nearby waters. The vast majority of M. krahuletzi fossils have been collected from the Burgschleinitz Formation of Eggenburg Bay, Austria. Fossils date to the Eggenburgian Age (20.8 - 18.3 Ma) to the Ottnangian (18.3 - 17 Ma). A specimen from France tentatively referred to M. cf. krahuletzi dates to the Karpatian Age, roughly 17.5-16.5 Ma. The Metaxytherium bonebeds of Eggenburg Bay have been suggested to represent mass death sites, possibly the result of reduced food supply following heavy storm events known to have occurred in this part of the Paratethys. The species was named in honor of Austrian geologist Johann Krahuletz.

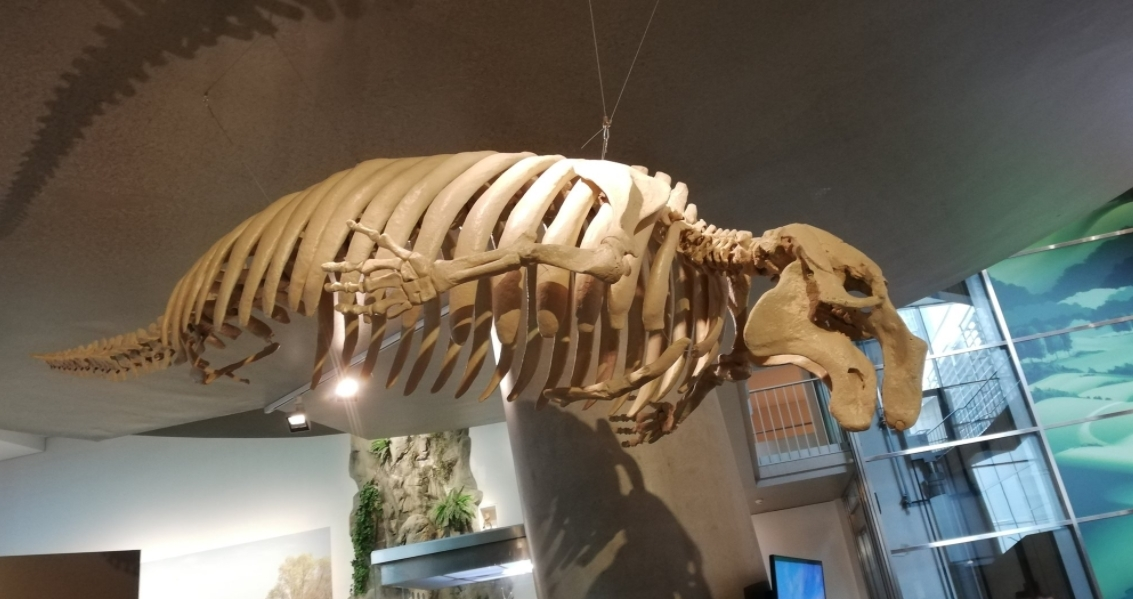
M. medium (=Thalattosiren) displayed at the Lower Austria Museum

- M. medium

The type species, M. medium is known from the Middle Miocene (Langhian) of Western and Central Europe (France, Netherlands, Austria), Greece and presumably Northern Africa. The most recent records of M. medium stem from late Miocene (Tortonian) Tuscany (10.5 to 8.14 Ma).

- M. serresii

A species originally described to include Pliocene (Early Zanclean) specimen from Montpellier, France, later discoveries extended its range to late Miocene (latest Tortonian) Italy as well as Sahabi, Libya. M. serresii is notably smaller than any of the European species before or after it across its range, while the size of the tusks had relatively increased. It was named by Paul Gervais after Marcel de Serres.

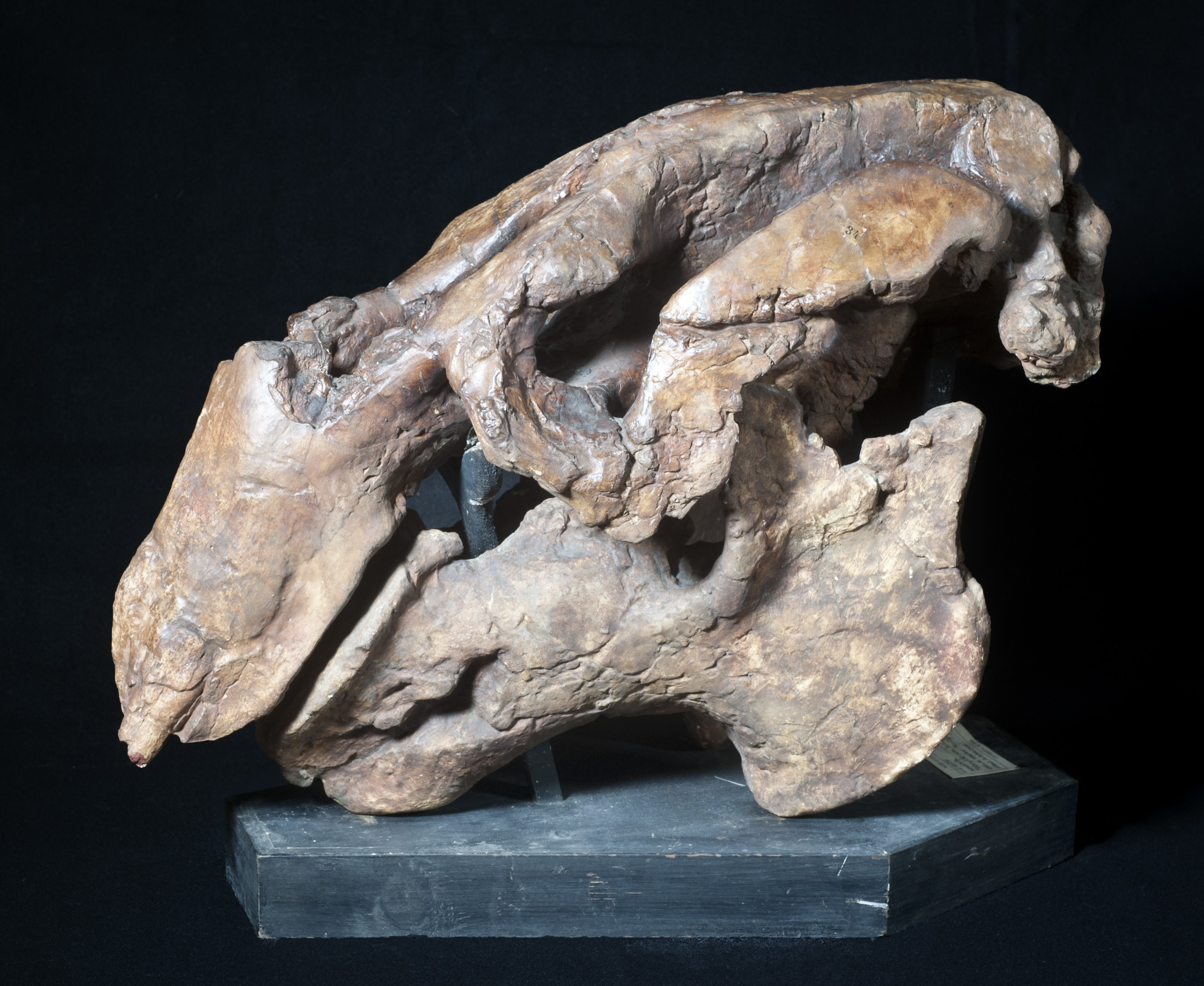
M. subapenninum (=Felsinotherium forestii Capellini, 1872. Plastotype of F. forestii, Natural History Museum of the University of Pisa, Italy)

- M. subapenninum

M. subapenninum, the last species of Metaxytherium in the fossil record, lived in the early and late Pliocene of Italy and Spain. It is the only species of sirenians that lived in the northwestern coasts of the Mediterranean Sea in the Pliocene and disappeared from the Mediterranean around 3 million years ago because of the progressive climate cooling. Fossils of these dugongs have been found in various parts of Italy, Spain and possibly on the island of Mallorca. M. subapenninum marks a return to greater body size in European Metaxytherium (4-5 meters) and possesses the largest tusk of this particular lineage.

There are tentatively referred specimens from the early Miocene Pirabas Formation of Brazil and undetermined remains from the middle Miocene Parana Formation of Argentina.

== Evolution ==
The exact origins of Metaxytherium are complicated and not entirely understood, with the two basal-most species being known from opposite sides of the Atlantic. Jorge Vélez-Juarbe and Daryl P. Domning propose in their 2014 paper that the closest relatives to the clade comprising dugongs, Metaxytherium and hydrodamalines are native to the Caribbean, suggesting a West-Atlantic Caribbean origin of the genus. This would place Caribosiren or a related genus as a potential ancestor of Metaxytherium. They further suggest that the genus must have originated during the middle Oligocene, due to the two basal most taxa likely having already diverged from one another prior to the Chattian. However, the large distance between these basal species, M. albifontanum and M. krahuletzi, may indicate that their origin is more complex than currently understood.

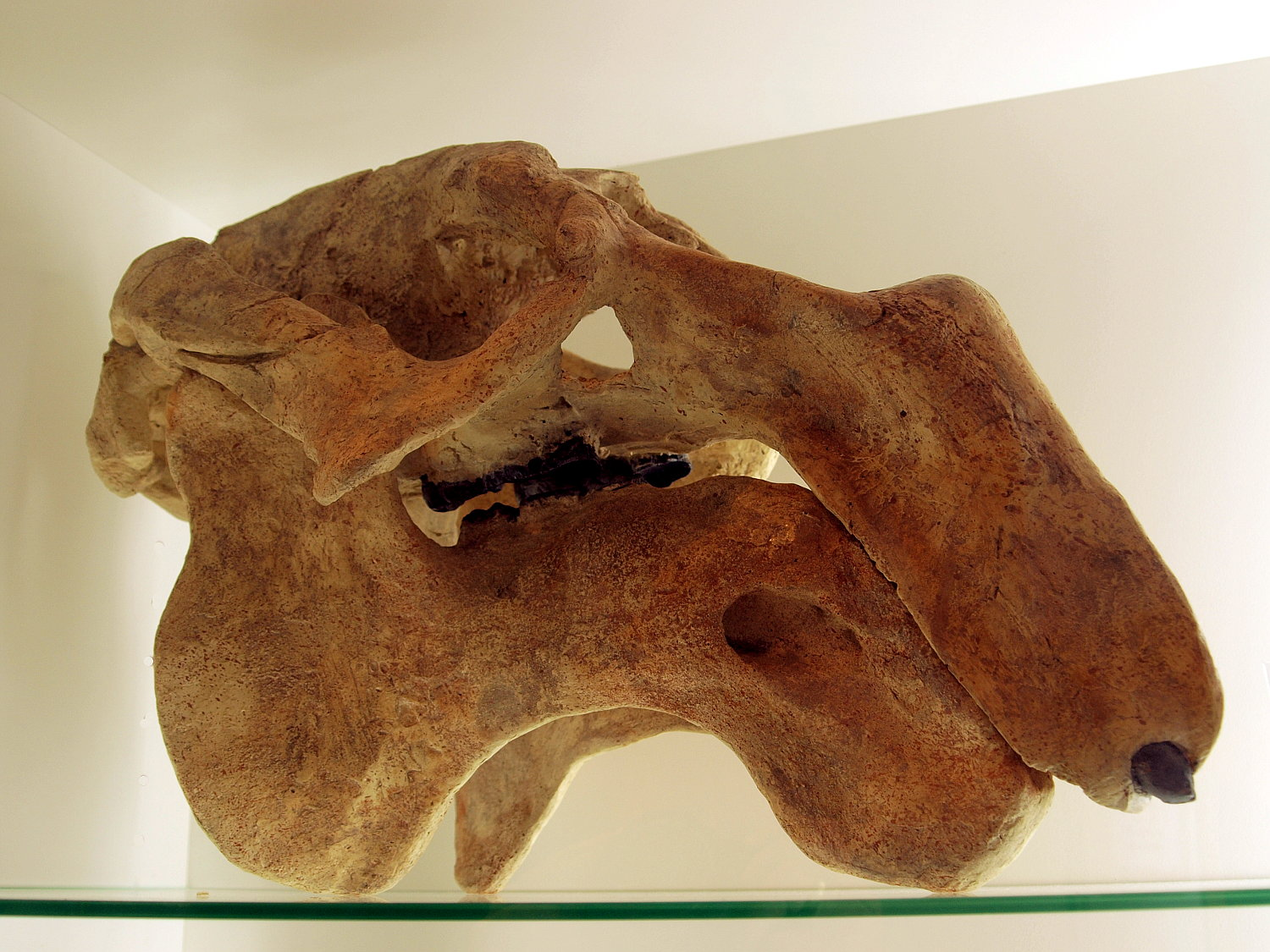
Reconstructed skull of M. medium specimen "Linda"

Research conducted prior to the description of M. albifontanum instead generally suggested a European origin of Metaxytherium, possibly derived from Lentiarenium christolii (previously Halitherium) and eventually forming an anagenetic lineage of European and North African sirenians. While M. krahuletzi and M. medium go through only relatively slight morphological changes, M. serresii represents a strange diversion from the overall trend observed among the European Metaxytherium chronospecies. Generally, the European forms of this genus seemed to grow to progressively larger sizes beginning with M. krahuletzi and culminating in M. subapenninum. M. serresii however is notably smaller than its ancestors and descendants. Originally, Domning and Thomas suggested that this drastic reduction in body size may have been a direct result of the Messinian salinity crisis, creating suboptimal conditions for the European seagrass fields and in turn affecting the sirenian population until the plant life could recover. The drastic increase in tusk size would also support this hypothesis, suggesting that when faced with declining resources, the European Metaxytherium adapted to better exploit what was available, including the rhizomes of seagrasses. However, more recent discoveries from Italy suggest that M. serresii already existed by the time of the Messinian Salinity Crisis, and the dwarfing may instead be a result of the Tortonian Salinity Crisis (7.8 - 7.3 Ma). Although earlier than previously assumed, the circumstances that caused the size decrease have remained similar. The relict species M. subapenninum represents the last stage of evolution of the European Metaxytherium, returning to and even exceeding the body size of the early and middle Miocene species while continuing the increase in tusk size and strengthening rostral reinforcement. Like M. serresii, M. subapenninum was endemic to the Mediterranean following the isolation of the Paratethys that previously supported Metaxytherium. Despite its adaptations to the cooling climate, Metaxytherium subapenninum failed to change its seagrass based diet in the same way the hydrodamalines of the Bering Sea did, eventually dying out towards the end of the Pliocene as temperatures continued to drop.

The presence of Metaxytherium species on the western coast of the Americas, in addition to their close phylogenetic ties with the Hydrodamalinae, has been suggested to represent a second anagenetic lineage starting with M. crataegense entering Peru via the Central American Seaway. M. arctodites has been hypothesized to be a direct descendant of this species found further north along the Mexican and Californian coastline. The hypothesis also suggests that this northern lineage would further give rise to Dusisiren and eventually culminate in the algae specialist Hydrodamalis, which persisted until historic times. Unlike the European forms, which continuously evolved larger tusks to deal with the environmental changes of the Late Miocene Mediterranean, the American lineage took a different approach, gradually shrinking their tusks until losing their teeth entirely in Hydrodamalinae.

== Phylogeny ==
Phylogenetic analysis suggests that Metaxytherium is a paraphyletic genus with close ties to the Hydrodamalinae, sea cows native to the colder waters of the northern Pacific, including the giant Steller's Sea Cow. Generally, analysis consistently recover hydrodamaline sea cows to be a direct off-shoot of the American lineage. M. subapenninum and M. serresii are generally accepted to be sister taxa and M. krahuletzi appears as the most basal most member of the genus. Vélez-Juarbe & Domning recover the following tree in their description of M. albifontanum:

- - Proboscidea
  - - Desmostylia
    - Sirenia
      - Prorastomidae
      - - Protosirenidae
        - - Trichechidae
          - Dugongidae
            - - Eotheroides aegyptiacum
              - Halitherium taulannense
            - - Halitherium schinzii
              - - Halitherium christolii
                - - Caribosiren turneri
                  - - USNM 542417
                    - - - Metaxytherium krahuletzi
                        - - Metaxytherium albifontanum
                          - - Metaxytherium crataegense
                            - - Metaxytherium medium
                              - - Metaxytherium floridanum
                                - - - Metaxytherium serresii
                                    - Metaxytherium subapenninum
                                  - Hydrodamalinae
                                    - Dusisiren jordani
                                    - Hydrodamalis cuestae
                      - Dugonginae

The following phylogenetic tree is a simplified version of the results produced by Kerber and Moraes–Santos (2021), recovering similar results with the exception of a polytomy within Metaxytherium, similar to that recovered by Sorbi et al. (2021). In their phylogeny Sirenia is limited to manatees and dugongs.

- Sirenia
  - Trichechidae
  - Dugongidae
    - Kaupitherium bronni
    - Kaupitherium gruelli
    - - Lentiarenium christolii
      - - Caribosiren turneri
        - Priscosiren atlantica
        - - - - Metaxytherium krahuletzi
              - - Metaxytherium albifontanum
                - - Metaxytherium crataegense
                  - Metaxytherium medium
                  - Metaxytherium floridanum
                  - - Metaxytherium serresii
                    - Metaxytherium subapenninum
                  - - Metaxytherium arctodites
                    - - Dusisiren jordani
                      - - Dusisiren dewana
                        - - Dusisiren cuestae
                          - Hydrodamalis gigas
            - Dugonginae

== Paleobiology ==
=== Diet ===
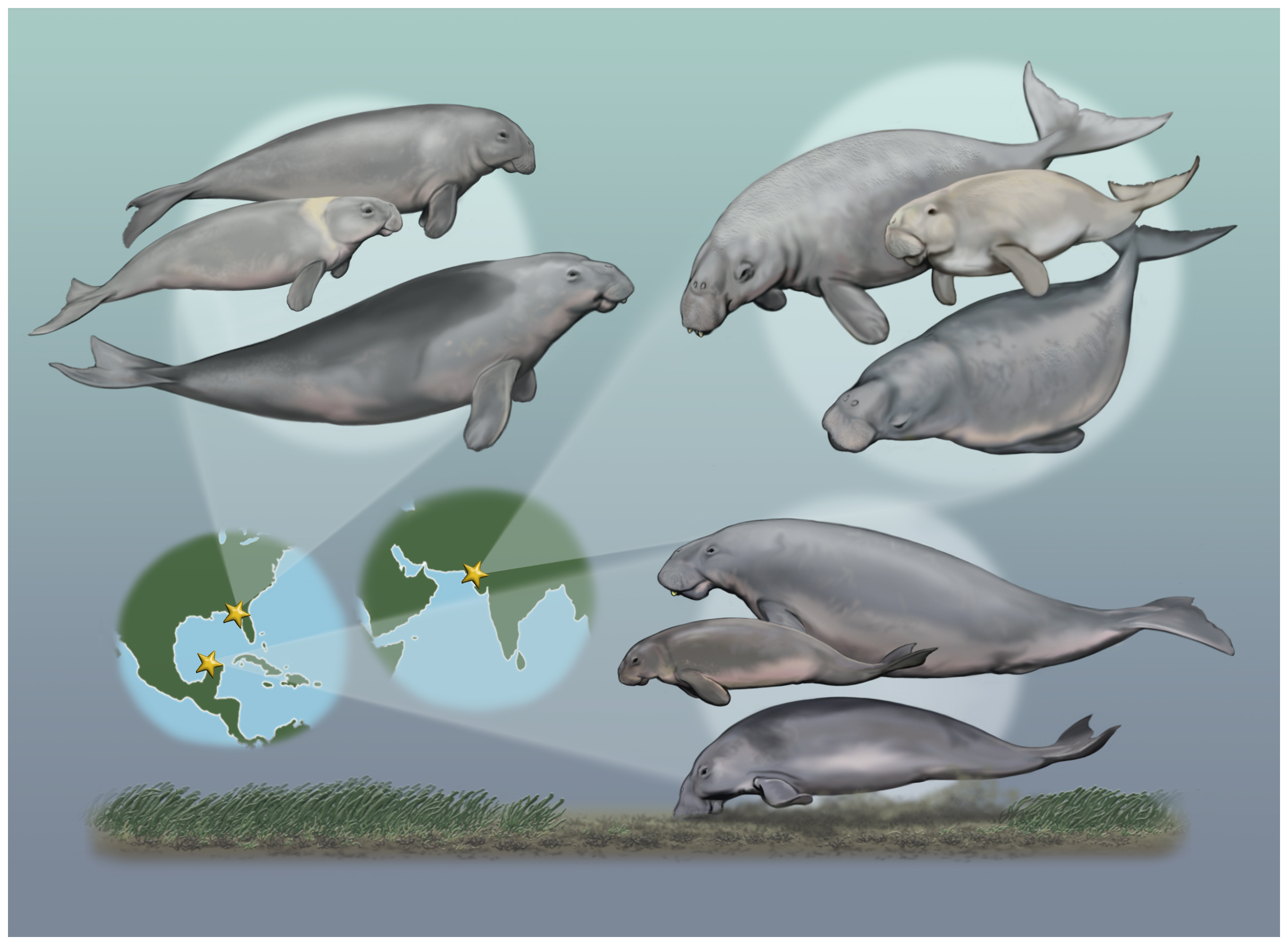
Sirenians of Oligocene Florida (top left)

Unlike modern sirenians, Metaxytherium is known from a multitude of environments that it shared with other species of sea cows. M. albifontanum for instance coexisted with both Crenatosiren olseni and Dioplotherium manigaulti. A variety of anatomical adaptations can be directly tied to differing foraging habits and dietary preferences. This includes the degree to which the snout is downturned, the size and shape of the tusks and naturally body size. Tusk size and shape in particular is strongly tied to foraging habits, with larger tusks allowing sirenians to uproot the rhizomes of seagrass. Larger body size meanwhile allows for more efficient grazing and larger foraging areas while deterring predators, while smaller species are capable of foraging in waters too shallow for larger species. In Oligocene Florida, the three present species mostly differ in tusk and body size. Dioplotherium is at least a meter longer than either sympatric species and possessed strong tusks well adapted for uprooting strong seagrass. M. albifontanum is close in size to Crenatosiren, but possesses smaller tusks, most likely preferring small sized rhizomes and thus avoiding competition with the larger-tusked species.

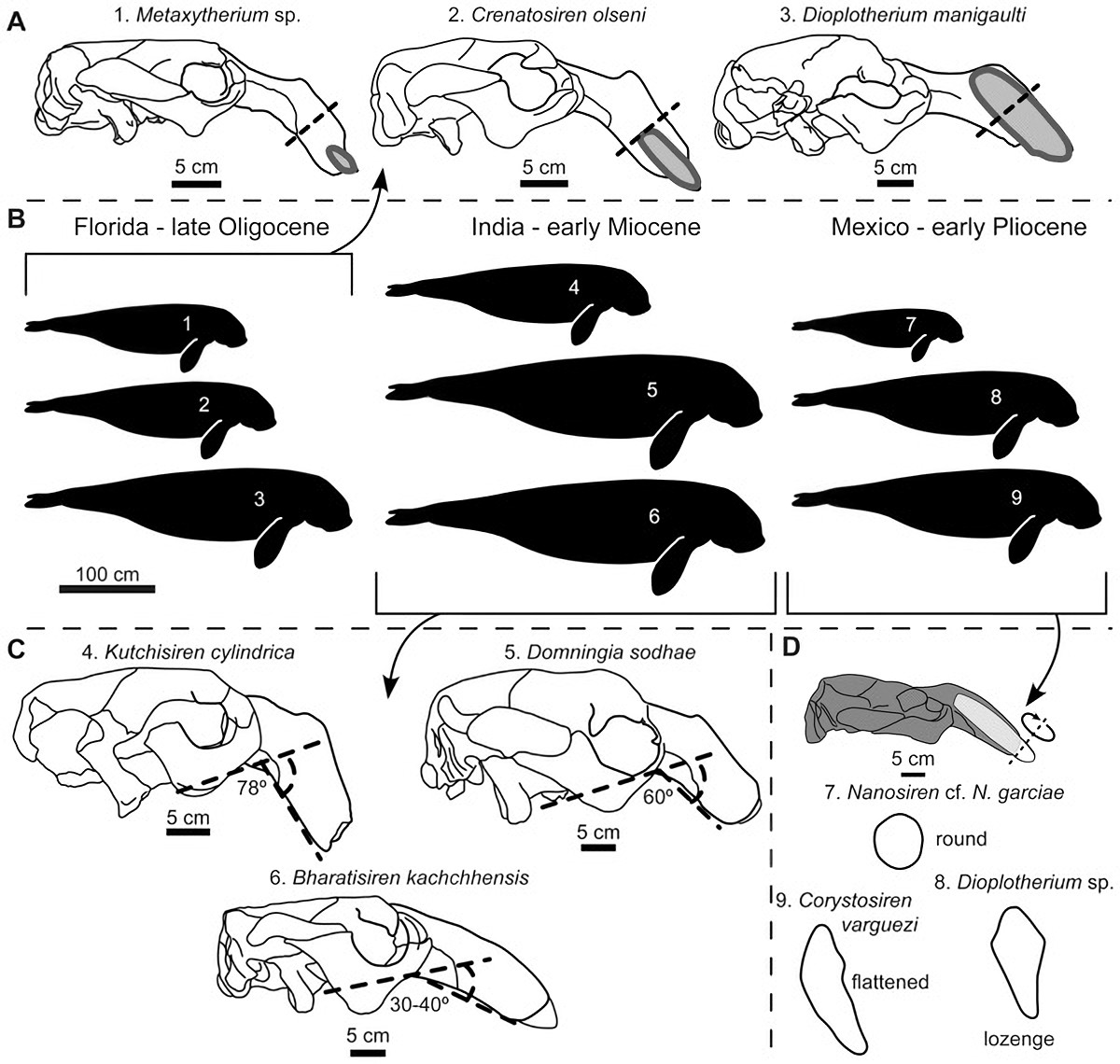
Tusk and body size diversity in sympatric Sirenians

In a 2004 publication MacFadden and colleagues attempted to determine diet and habitat of the extinct sirenians of Florida using isotopic values. Concerning Metaxytherium, both M. crataegense and M. floridanum were analyzed. In modern taxa, dugongs show a sharply downturned upper jaw, generally associated with its grazing lifestyle, while manatees have comparably shallow rostral deflection. Although not thoroughly researched, it's hypothesized that the downturned snout helps with grazing by keeping the mouth close to the ground while maintaining a horizontal posture for the rest of the body. Both types of skull morphology can be seen in the two analyzed taxa, with M. crataegense having a relatively straight upper jaw while M. floridanum shows a strong downturn similar to the dugong. Despite the more manatee-like morphology of M. crataegense, both species were recovered with mean carbon isotopic values that would indicate a specialized seagrass diet. There are some outliers however. Three of the seven M. floridanum specimens from the Clarendonian/early Hemphillian later Bone Valley sequence show carbon isotopic values indicative of a diet consisting of C3 plants (which plants in particular however could not be determined). Oxygen values generally support a marine lifestyle, but 3 isolated specimens may have lived in freshwater. There was however no overlap between the freshwater specimens and those not specialised in seagrass.

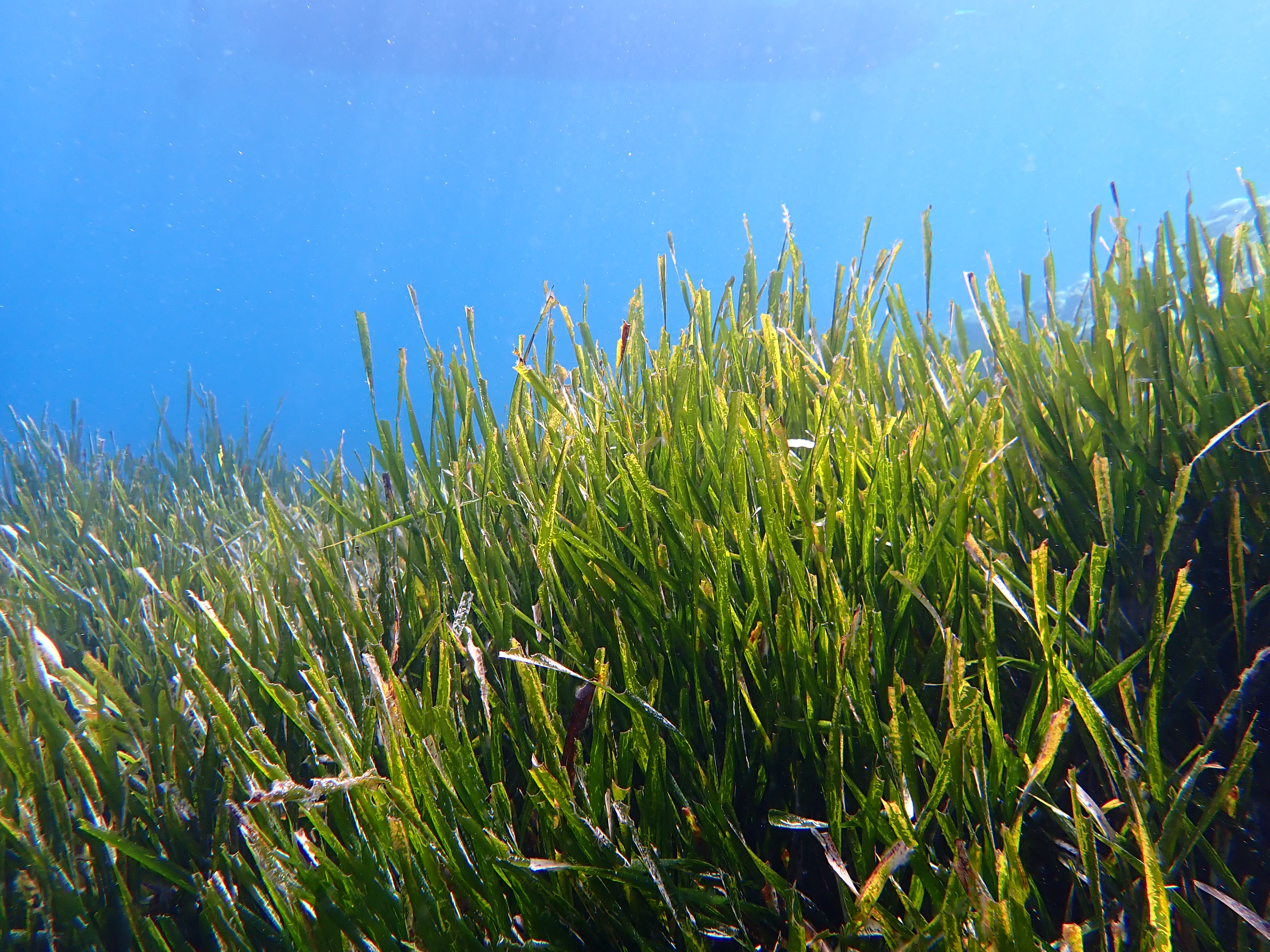
Posidonia oceanica

The diet of the European lineage meanwhile followed a clearly observable trend from the Miocene to the Pliocene. Early taxa such as M. krahuletzi and M. medium had small tusks and likely fed on the leaves of seagrasses as well as small to medium-sized rhizomes. The Tortonian and Messinian Salinity Crisis may have caused shifts in the seagrass flora of the Mediterranean Basin, leading to a greater percentage of rhizomes in the diet of Metaxytherium and causing the "medium" sized tusk-condition seen in M. serresii. As conditions in the Mediterranean stabilized, previously dominant seagrasses such as Posidonia oceanica recolonized the area and become a key component in the sirenian's diet. M. subapenninum could have developed its larger tusks to specifically feed on the thick and nutrient rich rhizomes of Posidonia rather than returning to their previous diet. This would have been furthermore beneficial as Posidonia provided a relatively stable food source compared to some of the other seagrass species, which fluctuate in availability between seasons.

=== Predation ===
In 2012 the disarticulated skeleton of a young Metaxytherium, tentatively referred to M. cf. medium due to its stratigraphic position in the Badenian, was found in Styria. Although not particularly complete, the fossil proved to be significant as it was preserved alongside seven teeth belonging to the extinct tiger shark Galeocerdo aduncus. Furthermore, the ribs of the specimen bear grooves perfectly matching tiger shark dentition, showing that one or more sharks fed on the carcass. Another paper from the same year describes fossils of M. subapenninum that bear toothmarks similar to those of extant juvenile Bluntnose sixgill sharks. Although adults are known to inhabit deeper waters, whereas sirenians prefer the shallows, juvenile hexanchid sharks have been observed feeding in shallower waters at night.

== See also ==
- Evolution of sirenians
