= San Sebastián Limestone =

Geologic formation in Puerto Rico

San Sebastián Formation
- Stratigraphic range: Early to Late Oligocene, 29.8–26.5 Ma
- Type: Formation
- Unit of: Rio Guatemala Group

Lithology
- Primary: Limestone
- Other: Sandstone, mudstone

Location
- Coordinates: 18.4°N 67.0°W
- Approximate paleocoordinates: 17.6°N 66.0°W
- Region: Puerto Rico
- Country: United States

Type section
- Named for: San Sebastián, Puerto Rico

The San Sebastián Formation is a geologic formation in Puerto Rico. It preserves fossils dating back to the Oligocene period.

It was primarily deposited as limestone in a marine environment, but some localities with a significant amount of terrestrial fauna appear to have been deposited in a deltaic environment. It contains some of the earliest fossils of terrestrial Caribbean vertebrates, including chinchilloid rodents and Eleutherodactylus frogs. In addition, taxa that are no longer known from the Caribbean, such as gavialid crocodilians and geomyoid rodents, have also been recovered from the formation.

== Vertebrate paleofauna ==
Based on the Paleobiology Database:

=== Cartilaginous fish ===
| Genus | Species | Location | Notes | Images |
|---|---|---|---|---|
| Ginglymostomatidae indet. | | | A nurse shark of uncertain affinities. | |

=== Amphibians ===
| Genus | Species | Material | Notes | Images |
|---|---|---|---|---|
| Eleutherodactylus | E. sp. | Distal humerus | A coquí frog. | |

=== Reptiles ===
| Genus | Species | Material | Notes | Images |
|---|---|---|---|---|
| Aktiogavialis | A. puertoricensis | Incomplete braincase, cranial elements | A gavialid crocodilian. Type locality of genus and species. | |
| Pelomedusidae indet. | | | A pelomedusid side-necked turtle. | |

=== Mammals ===
| Genus | Species | Material | Notes | Images |
|---|---|---|---|---|
| Borikenomys | B. praecursor | Teeth | A chinchilloid rodent. Type locality of genus and species. | |
| Caribeomys | C. merzeraudi | Teeth | A geomyoid rodent. Type locality of genus and species, first evidence of geomyoids from the Caribbean. | |
| Caribosiren | C. turneri | | A dugongid sirenian. | |
| Priscosiren | P. atlantica | | A dugongid sirenian. | |

== See also ==
- List of fossiliferous stratigraphic units in Puerto Rico
