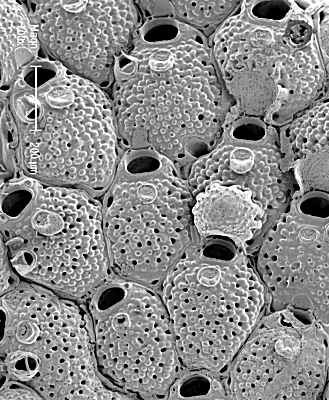
- Microporella lunifera

Scientific classification
- Kingdom: Animalia
- Phylum: Bryozoa
- Class: Gymnolaemata
- Order: Cheilostomatida
- Suborder: Flustrina
- Superfamily: Schizoporelloidea
- Family: Microporellidae; Hincks, 1879

Genera
- See classification

= Microporellidae =

Microporellidae Temporal range: Miocene - Recent

Family of moss animals

The Microporellidae is a family within the bryozoan order Cheilostomatida.

== Classification ==
- Family Microporellidae
  - Genus Adelascopora
  - Genus Calloporina
  - Genus Chronocerastes
  - Genus Cribriporella
  - Genus Diporula
  - Genus Fenestruloides
  - Genus Flustramorpha
  - Genus Microporella
  - Genus Microporelloides
  - Genus Pseudoadelascopora
  - Genus Tenthrenulina
