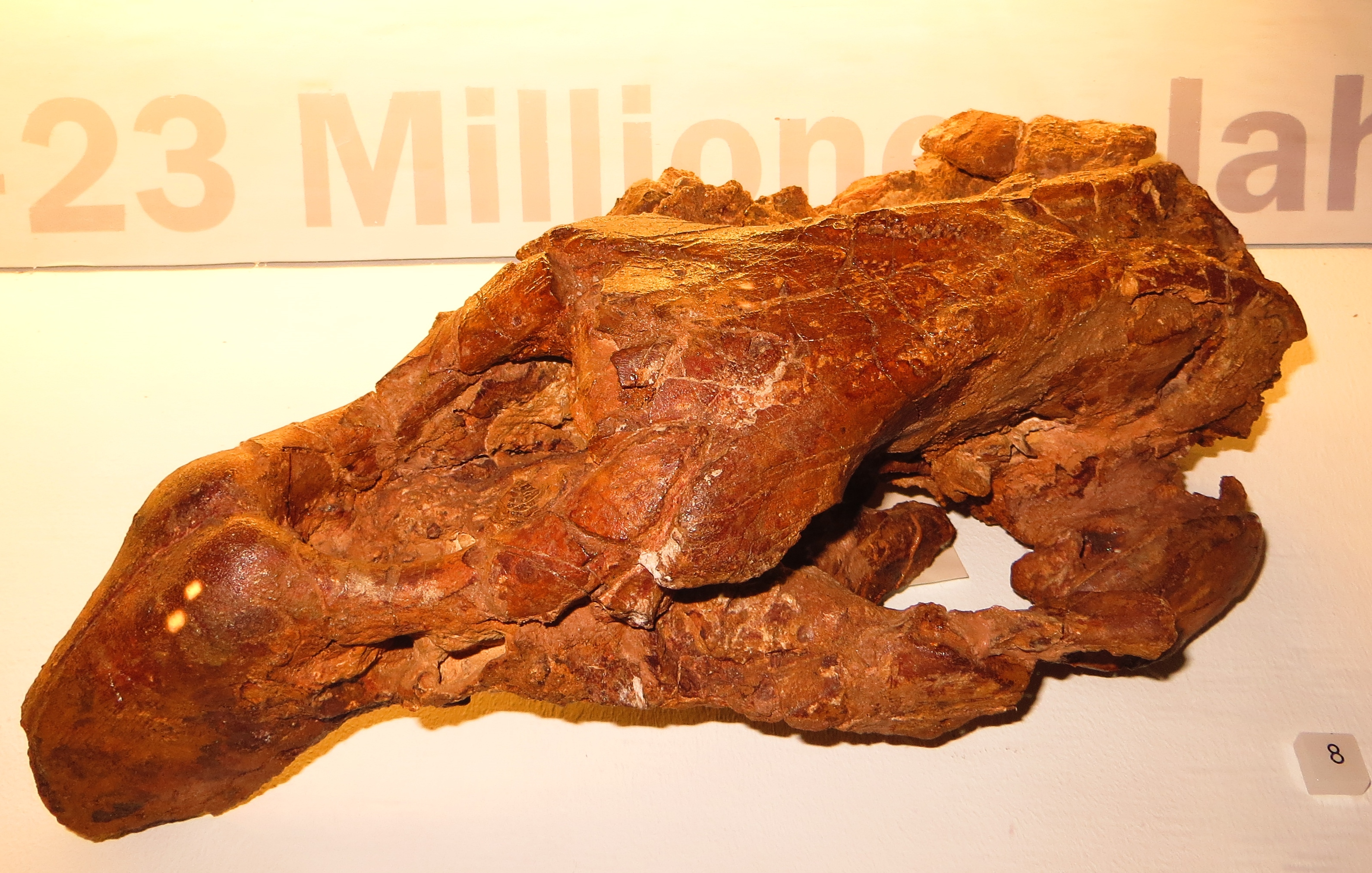
- Skull of E. libyca.

Scientific classification
- Kingdom: Animalia
- Phylum: Chordata
- Class: Mammalia
- Order: Sirenia
- Family: Dugongidae
- Genus: †Eosiren Andrews, 1902

Species
- Eosiren abeli; Eosiren imenti; Eosiren libyca; Eosiren stromeri

= Eosiren =

Eosiren Temporal range: Late Eocene–Oligocene

Extinct genus of mammals

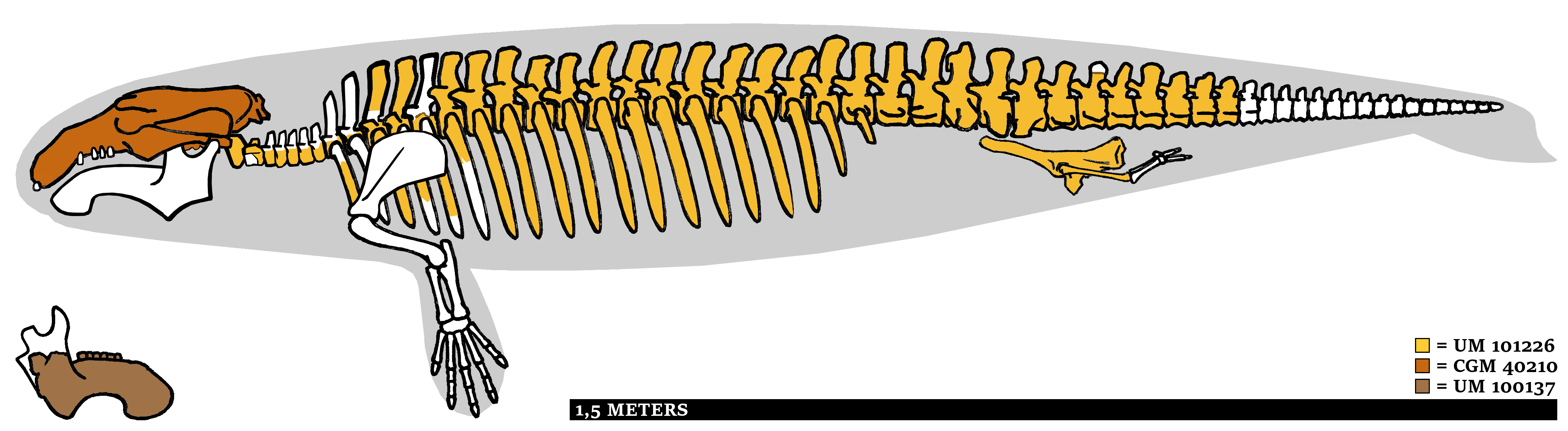
Drawing of skeleton.

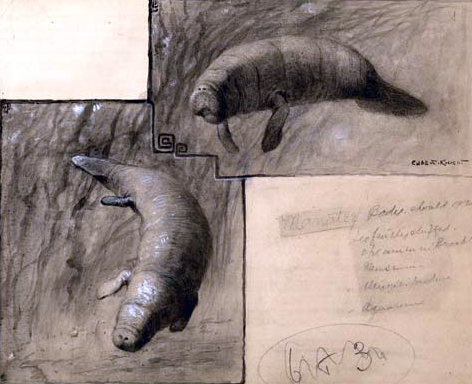
E. libyca and an extant manatee by Charles R. Knight, 1907

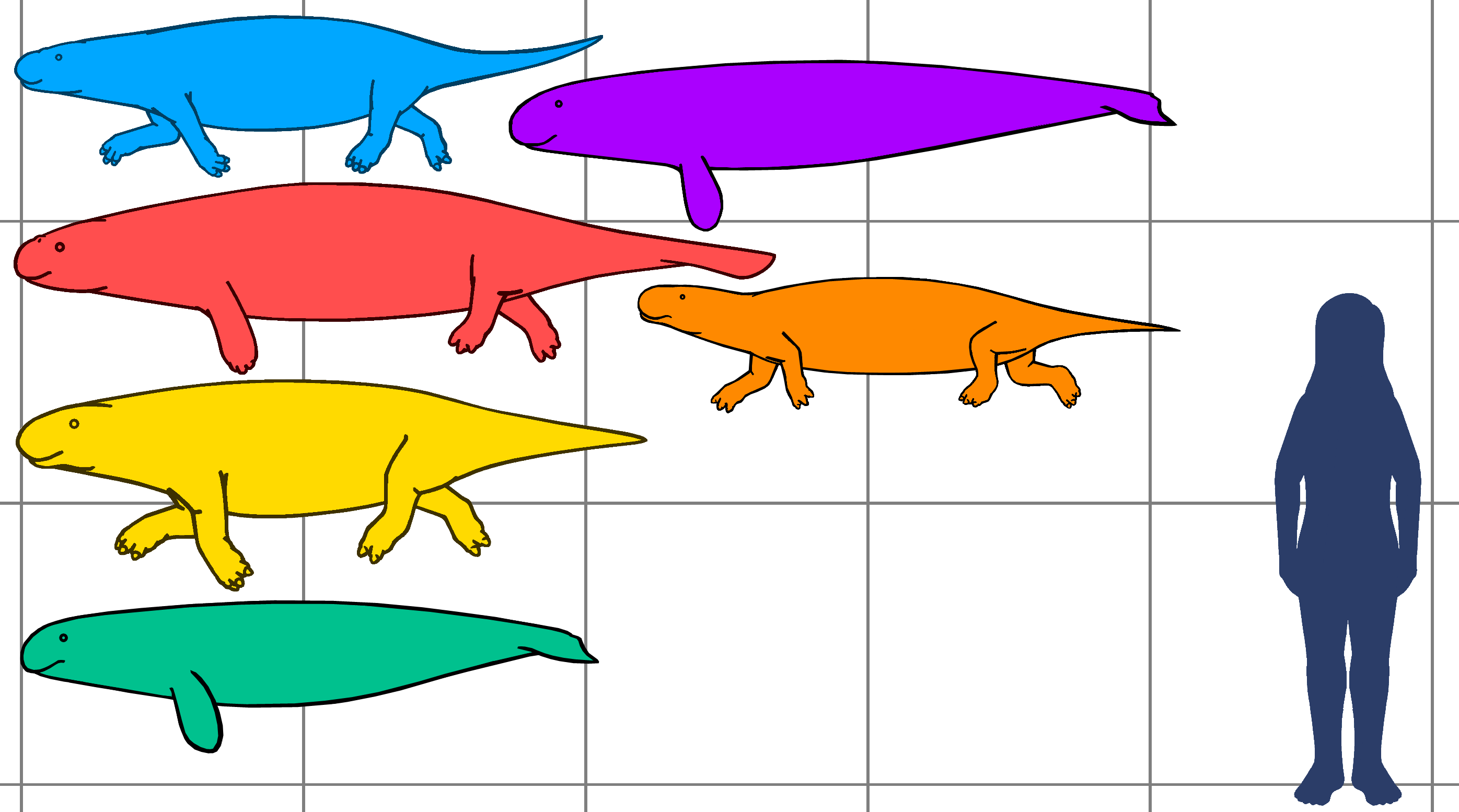
Size of Eosiren (purple) compared to other Eocene sirenians and a human.

Eosiren is an extinct genus of sea cow that lived during the Late Eocene (later Priabonian) to Early Oligocene (Rupelian). Several fossils have been found in Egypt. It seems like the species E. abeli were contemporaneous with Protosiren and Eotheroides. Like them, Eosiren closely resembled modern sirenians, with the primary differences being somewhat larger innominates and the presence of thigh bones.

Eosiren was first described by vertebrage paleontologist Charles William Andrews in 1902, who distinguished it from the genus Halitherium due to differences in the teeth and mandible. Later that year, Science published a summary of his findings in a collection on advances in zoopaleontology.
