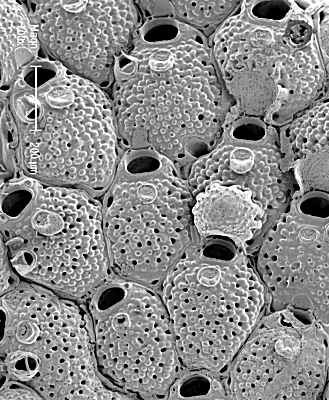

Scientific classification
- Kingdom: Animalia
- Phylum: Bryozoa
- Class: Gymnolaemata
- Order: Cheilostomatida
- Family: Microporellidae
- Genus: Microporella; Hincks, 1877

= Microporella =

Genus of bryozoans

Microporella is a genus of bryozoans belonging to the family Microporellidae.

The genus has cosmopolitan distribution.

Species:

- Microporella acicularis Winston, 2016
- Microporella agonistes Gordon, 1984
- Microporella alaskana Dick & Ross, 1988
- Microporella ampla Canu & Bassler, 1928
- Microporella antarctica Hu & Wang, 1984
- Microporella antiborealis Liu & Liu, 2001
- Microporella appendiculata (Heller, 1867)
- Microporella arctica Norman, 1903
- Microporella areolata Moyano, 1983
- Microporella areolata O'Donoghue & O'Donoghue, 1923
- Microporella aspera (d'Orbigny, 1852)
- Microporella barrandei (Reuss, 1847)
- Microporella berningi Zágoršek, 2010
- Microporella bicollaris Di Martino & Rosso, 2021
- Microporella bicristata (Busk, 1854)
- Microporella bifoliata Ulrich & Bassler, 1904
- Microporella borealis Suwa & Mawatari, 1998
- Microporella browni Harmelin, Ostrovsky, Cáceres-Chamizo & Sanner, 2011
- Microporella cailleti Canu & Bassler, 1935
- Microporella californica Busk, 1856
- Microporella candeana (d'Orbigny, 1852)
- Microporella catalinensis Soule, Soule & Chaney, 1995
- Microporella chubutiana Canu, 1908
- Microporella ciliata (Pallas, 1766)
- Microporella clypeiformis Liu, 2001
- Microporella collaroides Harmelin, Ostrovsky, Cáceres-Chamizo & Sanner, 2011
- Microporella coronata (Audouin, 1826)
- Microporella coronula (Soule, Chaney & Morris, 2003)
- Microporella crenilabris (Reuss, 1848)
- Microporella cribellata Liu & Liu, 2001
- Microporella cribosa
- Microporella cribrosa Osburn, 1952
- Microporella crustula Hayward & Winston, 2011
- Microporella cucullata Canu & Bassler, 1928
- Microporella curta Almeida, Souza, Menegola & Vieira, 2017
- Microporella decussata (Lamarck, 1816)
- Microporella dentilingua Tilbrook, 2006
- Microporella diademata (Lamouroux, 1825)
- Microporella dimidiata Ortmann, 1890
- Microporella discors Uttley & Bullivant, 1972
- Microporella divaricata Canu, 1904
- Microporella donovani Taylor & Foster, 1994
- Microporella echinata Androsova, 1958
- Microporella elegans Suwa & Mawatari, 1998
- Microporella epihalimeda Tilbrook, 2006
- Microporella eustomata (Gabb & Horn, 1862)
- Microporella fallax Canu, 1904
- Microporella ferrea Waters, 1882
- Microporella fimbriata Ryland & Hayward, 1992
- Microporella fissurifera Canu & Bassler, 1923
- Microporella flabelligera Levinsen, 1909
- Microporella formosa Suwa & Mawatari, 1998
- Microporella franklini (Soule, Chaney & Morris, 2003)
- Microporella funbio Ramalho & López-Fé, 2020
- Microporella galapagensis (Soule, Chaney & Morris, 2003)
- Microporella gappai Figuerola, Gordon & Cristobo, 2018
- Microporella genisii (Audouin, 1826)
- Microporella germana Dick & Ross, 1988
- Microporella gibbera Canu & Bassler, 1923
- Microporella gibbosula Canu & Bassler, 1930
- Microporella goreaui Winston & Jackson, 2021
- Microporella harmeri Hayward, 1988
- Microporella hastigera (Busk, 1884)
- Microporella hastingsae Harmelin, Ostrovsky, Cáceres-Chamizo & Sanner, 2011
- Microporella hawaiiensis (Soule, Chaney & Morris, 2003)
- Microporella heermannii (Gabb & Horn, 1862)
- Microporella hexagona Canu & Bassler, 1923
- Microporella huanghaiensis Liu, 2001
- Microporella hyadesi (Jullien, 1888)
- Microporella ichnusae Di Martino & Rosso, 2021
- Microporella impressa Nobre, 1905
- Microporella inamoena (Reuss, 1874)
- Microporella incrustans (Vigneaux, 1949)
- Microporella inermis Liu & Liu, 2001
- Microporella inflata Ulrich & Bassler, 1904
- Microporella infundibulipora Soule, Soule & Chaney, 1995
- Microporella intermedia Livingstone, 1929
- Microporella joannae Calvet, 1902
- Microporella ketchikanensis Dick, Grischenko & Mawatari, 2005
- Microporella klugei Kuklinski & Taylor, 2008
- Microporella laticella Canu & Bassler, 1928
- Microporella leopolitana Boyko, 1966
- Microporella lepralioides Canu & Bassler, 1925
- Microporella lepueana (Soule, Chaney & Morris, 2004)
- Microporella lezinyosi Boonzaaier-Davids, Florence & Gibbons, 2020
- Microporella lineata Canu & Bassler, 1929
- Microporella lingulata Di Martino, Taylor & Gordon, 2020
- Microporella luellae Grischenko, Dick & Mawatari, 2007
- Microporella lunifera (Haswell, 1881)
- Microporella madiba Florence, Hayward & Gibbons, 2007
- Microporella maldiviensis Harmelin, Ostrovsky, Cáceres-Chamizo & Sanner, 2011
- Microporella mandibulata Branch & Hayward, 2005
- Microporella marginata Maplestone, 1902
- Microporella marsupiata (Busk, 1860)
- Microporella mayensis Winston, 1984
- Microporella mazatlanica (Soule, Chaney & Morris, 2003)
- Microporella micropora Tilbrook, 2006
- Microporella modesta Di Martino, Taylor & Gordon, 2020
- Microporella monilifera Liu & Liu, 2001
- Microporella neocribroides Dick & Ross, 1988
- Microporella nidulata (Lamouroux, 1825)
- Microporella noaillanensis Vigneaux, 1949
- Microporella normani Canu & Bassler, 1928
- Microporella ordo Brown, 1952
- Microporella ordoides Di Martino, Taylor & Gordon, 2020
- Microporella orientalis Harmer, 1957
- Microporella pachyspina Di Martino & Rosso, 2021
- Microporella papulifera (Canu & Bassler, 1923)
- Microporella paterifera Winston & Jackson, 2021
- Microporella pectinata Tilbrook, 2006
- Microporella personata (Busk, 1854)
- Microporella peschongi (Soule, Chaney & Morris, 2003)
- Microporella pirikaensis Hayami, 1975
- Microporella plana Neviani, 1898
- Microporella planata Soule, Soule & Chaney, 1995
- Microporella pocilliformis Waters, 1885
- Microporella pontifica Osburn, 1952
- Microporella praecilata Ulrich & Bassler, 1904
- Microporella praeciliata Ulrich & Bassler, 1904
- Microporella protea Winston, 2005
- Microporella proxima Ramalho, Muricy & Taylor, 2011
- Microporella pulchra Androsova, 1958
- Microporella pulchra Suwa & Mawatari, 1998
- Microporella pyriformis (Busk, 1859)
- Microporella regularis (d'Orbigny, 1842)
- Microporella rhodanica David & Pouyet, 1972
- Microporella rogickae Winston, Hayward & Craig, 2000
- Microporella rusti Di Martino, Taylor, Gordon & Liow, 2017
- Microporella sanmiguelensis (Soule, Chaney & Morris, 2004)
- Microporella santabarbarensis (Soule, Chaney & Morris, 2004)
- Microporella sarasotaensis Di Martino, Taylor & Portell, 2019
- Microporella saucatsensis Vigneaux, 1949
- Microporella serrata Mawatari & Suwa, 1998
- Microporella setiformis O'Donoghue & O'Donoghue, 1923
- Microporella soulieri Calvet, 1902
- Microporella speciosa Suwa, Dick & Mawatari, 1998
- Microporella speculum Brown, 1952
- Microporella spicata MacGillivray, 1889
- Microporella stellata (Verrill, 1879)
- Microporella stenoporta Hayward & Taylor, 1984
- Microporella svalbardensis Kuklinski & Hayward, 2004
- Microporella tamiamiensis Di Martino, Taylor & Portell, 2019
- Microporella tanyae Di Martino, Taylor & Gordon, 2020
- Microporella tetrastoma (Römer, 1863)
- Microporella tonkinensis Dick, Ngai & Doan, 2020
- Microporella tractabilis Canu & Bassler, 1930
- Microporella trigonellata Suwa & Mawatari, 1998
- Microporella tubulifera Neviani, 1895
- Microporella typica O'Donoghue & O'Donoghue, 1923
- Microporella umbonata Hincks, 1883
- Microporella umboniformis Soule, Soule & Chaney, 1995
- Microporella umbonula (Osburn, 1952)
- Microporella umbraeula
- Microporella unca Mawatari & Suwa, 1998
- Microporella utriculus (Manzoni, 1869)
- Microporella vacuatus Liu & Liu, 2001
- Microporella ventricosa Canu & Bassler, 1929
- Microporella vibraculifera Hincks, 1883
- Microporella waghotensis Guha & Gopikrishna, 2007
- Microporella wrigleyi (Soule, Chaney & Morris, 2004)
