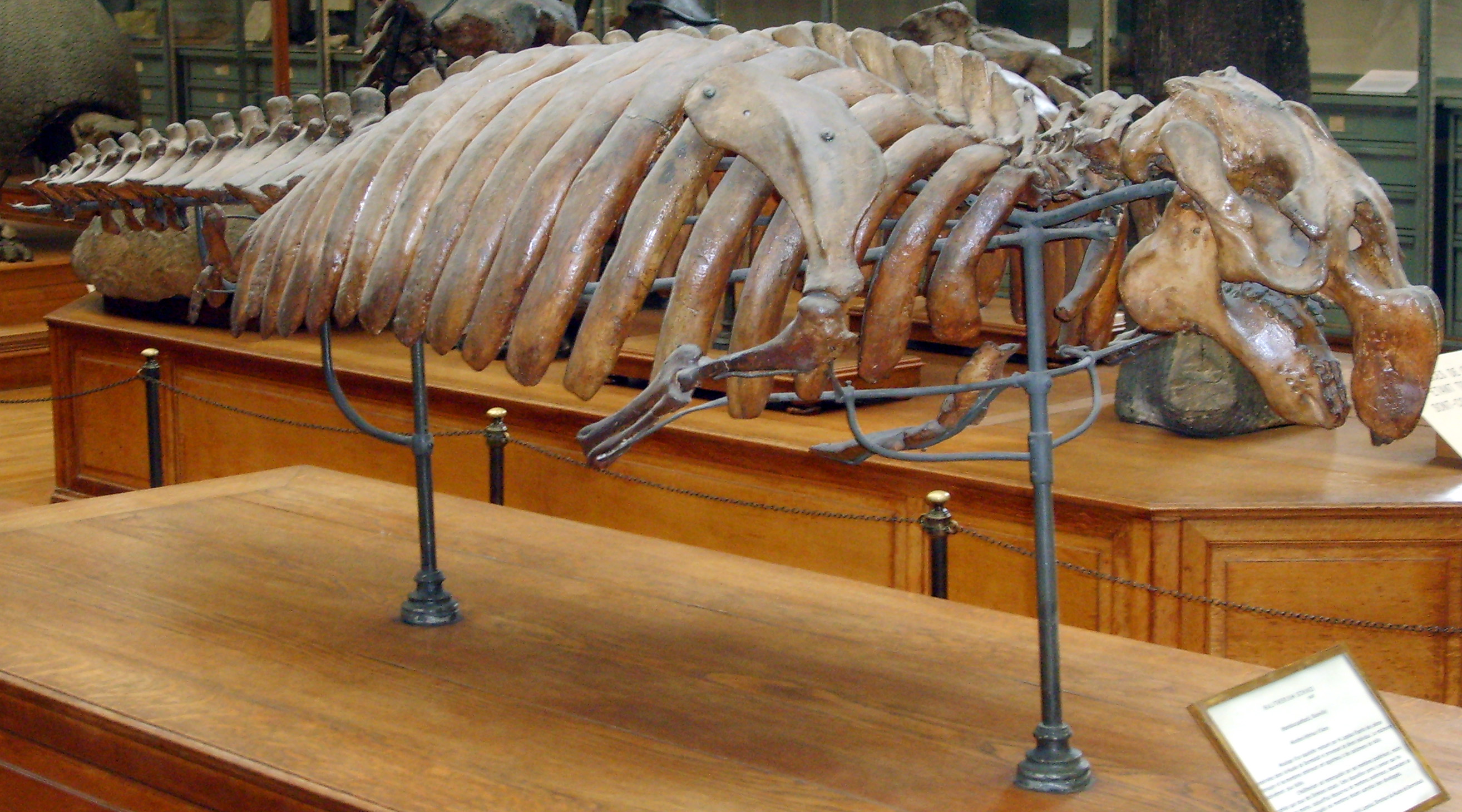
- Halitherium schinzi skeleton, Muséum national d'Histoire naturelle, Paris
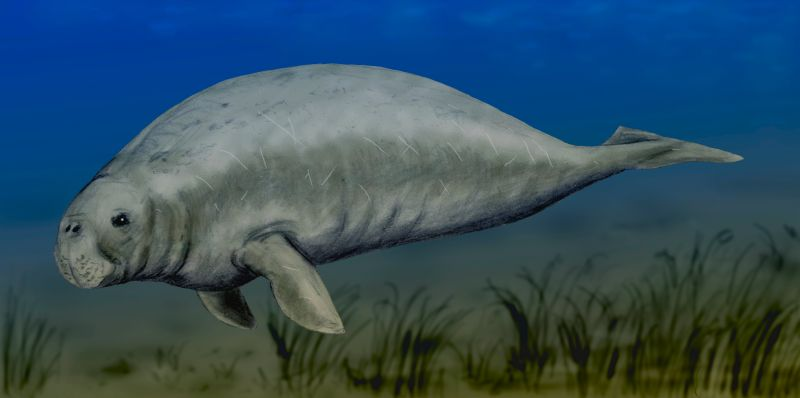
- Life restoration of H. schinzii

Scientific classification
- Kingdom: Animalia
- Phylum: Chordata
- Class: Mammalia
- Infraclass: Placentalia
- Order: Sirenia
- Family: Dugongidae
- Subfamily: †Halitheriinae
- Genus: †Halitherium; Kaup, 1838
- Species: †H. schinzii

Binomial name
- †Halitherium schinzii (Kaup, 1838)

= Halitherium =

Halitherium Temporal range: Late Eocene-Early Oligocene ~37–28 Ma

Extinct genus of mammals

Halitherium is a dubious genus of extinct dugongid sea cow that arose in the late Eocene, then became extinct during the early Oligocene. Its fossils are common in European shales. Inside its flippers were finger bones that did not stick out. Halitherium also had the remnants of back legs, which did not show externally. However, it did have a basic femur, joined to a reduced pelvis. Halitherium also had elongated ribs, presumably to increase lung capacity to provide fine control of buoyancy.

== Classification ==
Halitherium is the type genus of the subfamily Halitheriinae, which includes the well-known genera Eosiren and Eotheroides and lived from the Eocene to the Oligocene.

== Taxonomy ==
The genus Halitherium has had a confusing nomenclatural history. It was originally coined by Johann Jakob Kaup on the basis of a premolar from the early Oligocene (Rupelian) of southern Germany, but Kaup himself mistakenly stated that the premolar, in his opinion, gehort zu Hippopotamus dubius Cuv., unaware that H. dubius is actually a junior synonym of the primitive sirenian Protosiren minima, while simultaneously coining the genus and species name Pugmeodon schinzii for the same specimen. For his part, the renowned German paleontologist Christian Erich Hermann von Meyer included the type specimen of Halitherium schinzii in his composite species Halianassa studeri, whose hypodigm also included the type specimens of Metaxytherium medium and Protosiren minima as well as a Miocene-age maxilla and a skeleton from the molasse basin in Switzerland.

Later, Kaup synonymized Pugmeodon with Halitherium creating the new combination Halitherium schinzii, and the name Halitherium became universally accepted for the early Oligocene halitheriine material from Europe. Because Halitherium was originally based on a misidentified type species and due to the widespread use of Halitherium, the sirenian specialist Daryl Domning petitioned the ICZN to designate Pugmeodon schinzii as the type species of Halitherium, and the proposal was approved by the Commission in 1989, effectively making Pugmeodon a junior objective synonym of Halitherium in line with the current concept of Halitherium introduced by Kaup himself.

Voss (2013, 2014) dismisses Halitherium as a nomen dubium by virtue of being based on non-diagnostic remains. Voss based the opinion on the type species, H. schinzii, being nomen dubium, with its holotype fossil, an isolated molar, having no diagnostic value. and a 2017 study found specimens traditionally assigned to Halitherium schinzii to be two separate species, one of which takes the name Halitherium bronni Krauss, 1858. Because Halitherium is dubious, H. bronni has been re-assigned to Kaupitherium. The species Halitherium alleni, described by Simpson (1932) from skull caps in Oligocene deposits in Puerto Rico, was subsequently referred to other genera (Felsinotherium in 1966 and Metaxytherium in 1974), and was considered to be basal to the two Kaupitherium species.

A petition to designate the specimen BSPG 1956 I 540 as the neotype to replace the original non-diagnostic type specimen was submitted to the International Commission on Zoological Nomenclature (ICZN) in 2021, which was declined in 2024.

=== Formerly assigned species ===
- Halitherium antillense Matthew, 1916; nomen dubium
- Halitherium christolii Fitzinger, 1842 = Lentiarenium
- Halitherium bellunense de Zigno, 1875 = Italosiren
- Halitherium taulannense Sange, 2001; distinct, unnamed genus
- Halitherium olseni Rinehart, 1976 = Crenatosiren
- Halitherium alleni Sampson, 1932; distinct genus

== Related species ==
- Metaxytherium
- Rytiodus

== See also ==
- Evolution of sirenians
