= Italosiren =

Italosiren Temporal range: Aquitanian ~23–20 Ma

Scientific classification
- Kingdom: Animalia
- Phylum: Chordata
- Class: Mammalia
- Order: Sirenia
- Family: Dugongidae
- Subfamily: Dugonginae
- Genus: †Italosiren; Voss, Sorbi, and Domning, 2017

Species
- I. bellunensis (de Zigno, 1875) (type)

Extinct genus of mammals

Italosiren is an extinct genus of early dugong from the Early Miocene (Aquitanian) Libano Formation in Northern Italy.

== Classification ==
It was originally classified as a species of Halitherium, H. bellunense, but was eventually recognized as closer to the dugong than to Halitherium schinzii, necessitating erection of the new generic name Italosiren.

== See also ==
- Evolution of sirenians
