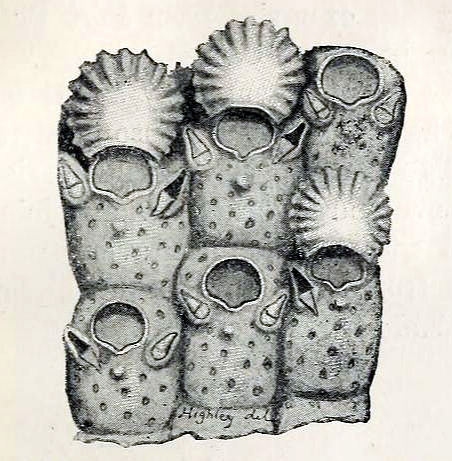
- Schizoporella unicornis

Scientific classification
- Kingdom: Animalia
- Phylum: Bryozoa
- Class: Gymnolaemata
- Order: Cheilostomatida
- Family: Schizoporellidae
- Genus: Schizoporella; Hincks, 1877

Species
- See text

= Schizoporella =

Genus of moss animals

Schizoporella is a genus of bryozoans in the family Schizoporellidae.

== Species ==
- Schizoporella aotearoa Gordon, 1989
- Schizoporella artabra Reverter-Gil, Souto & Fernández-Pulpeiro, 2009
- Schizoporella bifrons Moyano, 1965
- Schizoporella bilamellata Liu & Hu, 1991
- Schizoporella bispinosa (Nordgaard, 1906)
- Schizoporella bolini (Osburn, 1952)
- Schizoporella brunnescens Ortmann, 1890
- Schizoporella chondra Marcus, 1921
- Schizoporella cochinensis Menon & Nair, 1970
- Schizoporella confusa Calvet, 1906
- Schizoporella cornualis Hayward & Ryland, 1995
- Schizoporella costata Kluge, 1962
- Schizoporella crassirostris (Hincks, 1883)
- Schizoporella crassomuralis Canu & Bassler, 1927
- Schizoporella crustacea (Smitt, 1868)
- Schizoporella cucullata (Canu & Bassler, 1929)
- Schizoporella decorata Canu & Bassler, 1927
- Schizoporella dunkeri (Reuss, 1848)
- Schizoporella elliptica (Canu & Bassler, 1930)
- Schizoporella elmwoodiae Waters, 1900
- Schizoporella erectorostris (Canu & Bassler, 1930)
- Schizoporella errata (Waters, 1878)
- Schizoporella erratoidea Liu, 2001
- Schizoporella fallax Canu & Bassler, 1928
- Schizoporella fayalensis Calvet, 1903
- Schizoporella fistulata O'Donoghue & O'Donoghue, 1923
- Schizoporella flexilis Canu & Bassler, 1927
- Schizoporella floridana Osburn, 1914
- Schizoporella gibsonensis Tilbrook, 2006
- Schizoporella grandicella (Canu & Bassler, 1930)
- Schizoporella granulata O'Donoghue & O'Donoghue, 1923
- Schizoporella hesperia Hayward & Ryland, 1995
- Schizoporella hexagona Nordgaard, 1905
- Schizoporella inarmata Hincks, 1884
- Schizoporella incerta Kluge, 1929
- Schizoporella inconspicua Hincks, 1891
- Schizoporella japonica Ortmann, 1890
- Schizoporella kiiensis (Okada & Mawatari, 1938)
- Schizoporella leperei (Audouin in Savigny, 1826)
- Schizoporella limbata Lorenz, 1886
- Schizoporella longirostris Hincks, 1886
- Schizoporella magnifica (Hincks, 1886)
- Schizoporella magniporata Nordgaard, 1906
- Schizoporella maulina Moyano, 1983
- Schizoporella mutabilis Calvet, 1927
- Schizoporella neptuni (Jullien, 1882)
- Schizoporella obesa (Waters, 1900)
- Schizoporella obsoleta Jullien, 1882
- Schizoporella occidentalae Soule & Soule, 1964
- Schizoporella pachystega Kluge, 1929
- Schizoporella patula Hayward & Ryland, 1995
- Schizoporella perforata Canu & Bassler, 1929
- Schizoporella proditor Canu & Bassler, 1929
- Schizoporella pseudoerrata Soule, Soule & Chaney, 1995
- Schizoporella pungens Canu & Bassler, 1928
- Schizoporella smitti Kluge, 1962
- Schizoporella spinosa Souto, Reverter-Gil & Fernández-Pulpeiro, 2010
- Schizoporella stelloperforata Kluge, 1961
- Schizoporella stylifera (Levinsen, 1886)
- Schizoporella tetragona (Reuss, 1848)
- Schizoporella thompsoni Kluge, 1962
- Schizoporella triaviculata Calvet, 1903
- Schizoporella trimorpha Canu & Bassler, 1928
- Schizoporella umbonata O'Donoghue & O'Donoghue, 1926
- Schizoporella unicornis (Johnston in Wood, 1844)
