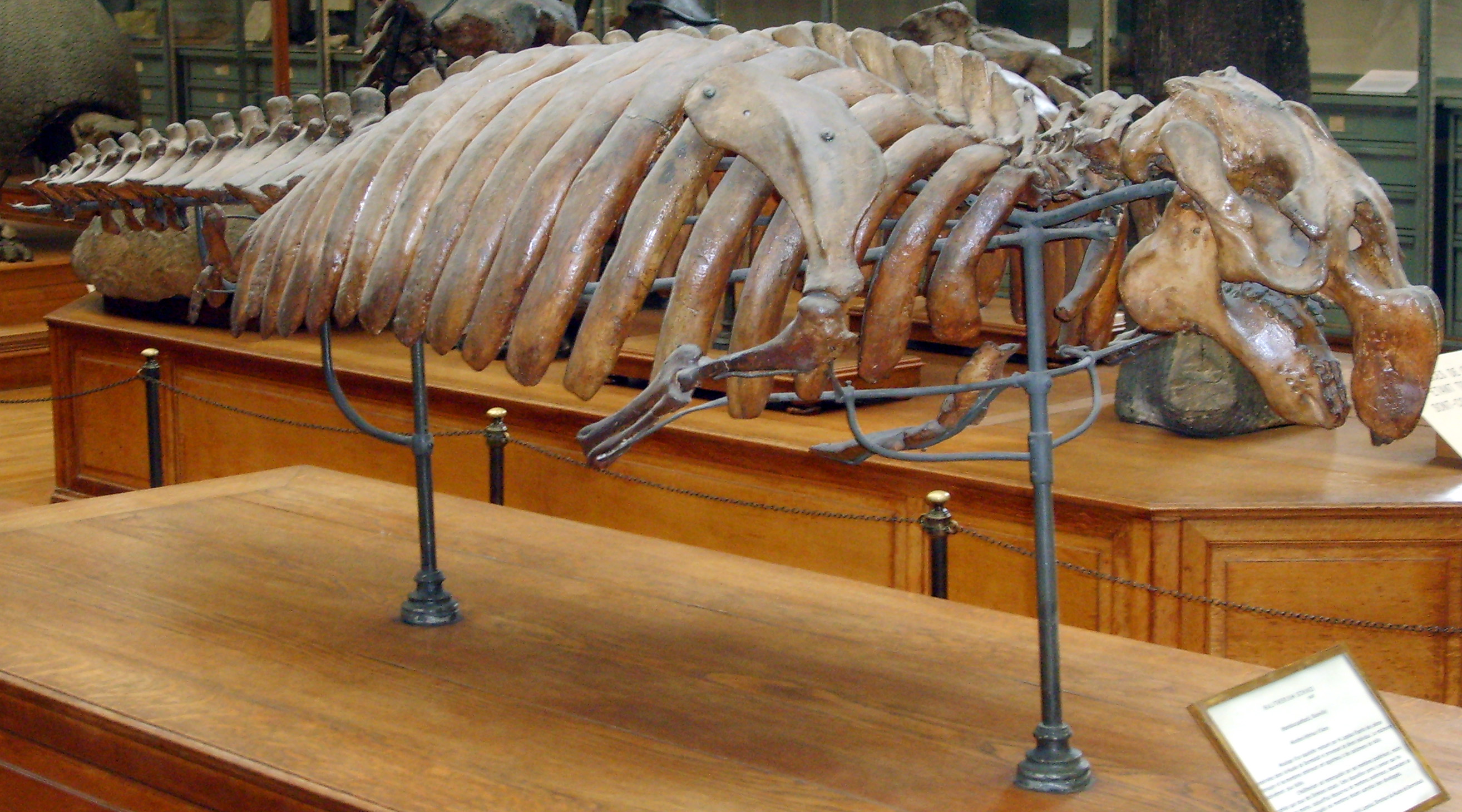
- Kaupitherium skeleton, Muséum national d'Histoire naturelle, Paris

Scientific classification
- Kingdom: Animalia
- Phylum: Chordata
- Class: Mammalia
- Order: Sirenia
- Family: Dugongidae
- Genus: †Kaupitherium; Voss, 2017

Species
- Kaupitherium bronni (Krauss, 1858); Kaupitherium gruelli Voss, 2017 (type)

= Kaupitherium =

Kaupitherium Temporal range: Early Oligocene ~34–28 Ma

Extinct genus of sea cow

Kaupitherium is an extinct dugongid sea cow that lived during the Oligocene. Fossils of the genus have been found in the Alzey Formation of Germany. Inside its flippers were finger bones that did not stick out. Kaupitherium also had the residues of back legs, which did not show externally. However, it did have a basic femur, joined to a reduced pelvis. Kaupitherium also had elongated ribs, presumably to increase lung capacity to provide fine control of buoyancy.

== Taxonomy ==
"Halitheriine" dugongid remains from Oligocene deposits in Europe were previously referred to Halitherium schinzii by many authors. However, Voss (2013, 2014) dismissed Halitherium as a nomen dubium by virtue of being based on non-diagnostic remains. Voss based the opinion on the type species, H. schinzii, being nomen dubium, with its holotype fossil, an isolated molar, having no diagnostic value. and a 2017 study found specimens traditionally assigned to Halitherium schinzii to be two separate species, one of which takes the name Halitherium bronni Krauss, 1858. Because Halitherium is dubious, the dugongid remains traditionally known as Halitherium were given the new genus Kaupitherium.

== Related genera ==
- Metaxytherium
- Rytiodus

== See also ==
- Evolution of sirenians
