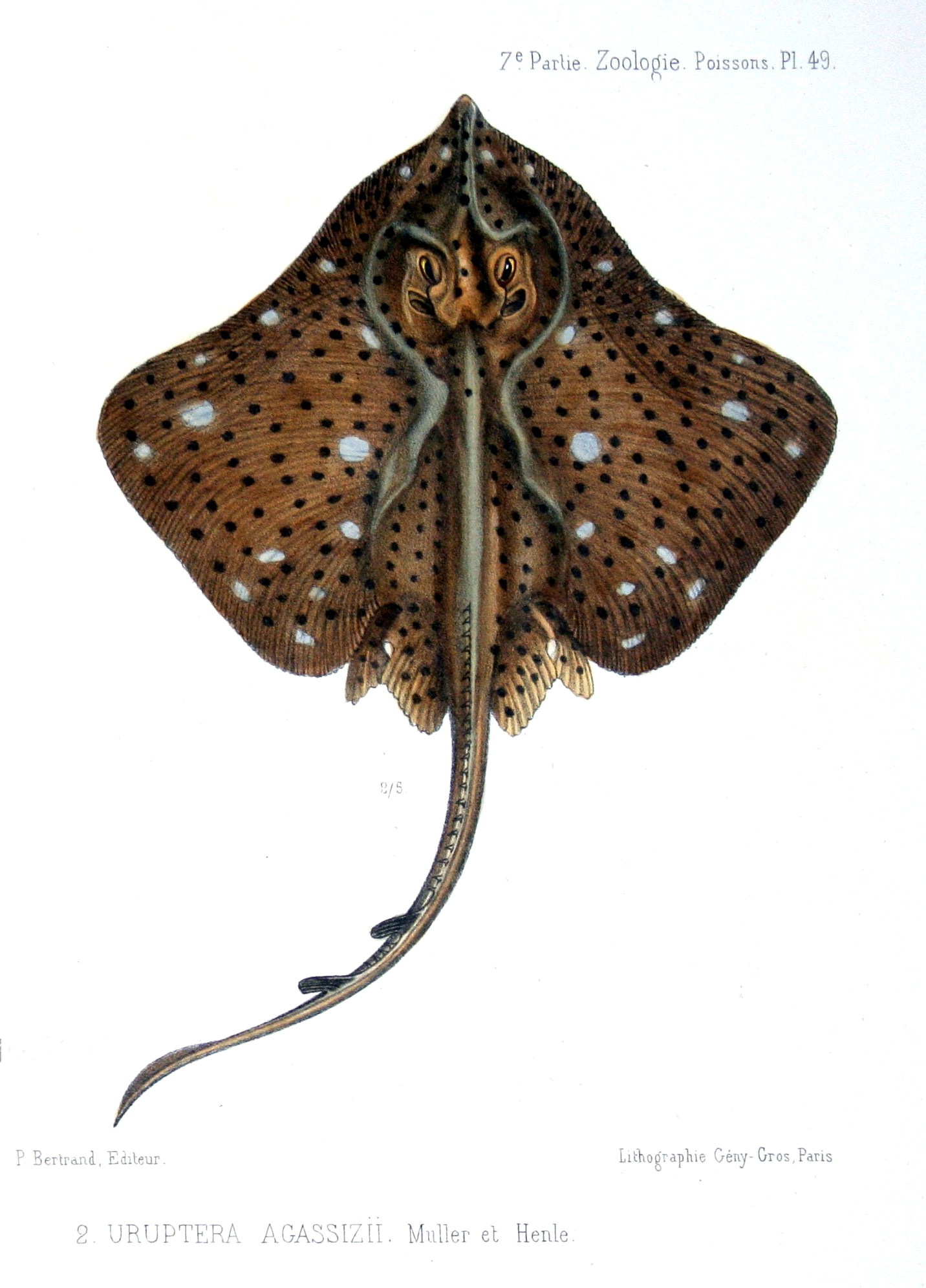

Conservation status
- Vulnerable (IUCN 3.1)

Scientific classification
- Kingdom: Animalia
- Phylum: Chordata
- Class: Chondrichthyes
- Subclass: Elasmobranchii
- Order: Rajiformes
- Family: Arhynchobatidae
- Genus: Rioraja; Whitley, 1939
- Species: R. agassizii

Binomial name
- Rioraja agassizii (J. P. Müller & Henle, 1841)
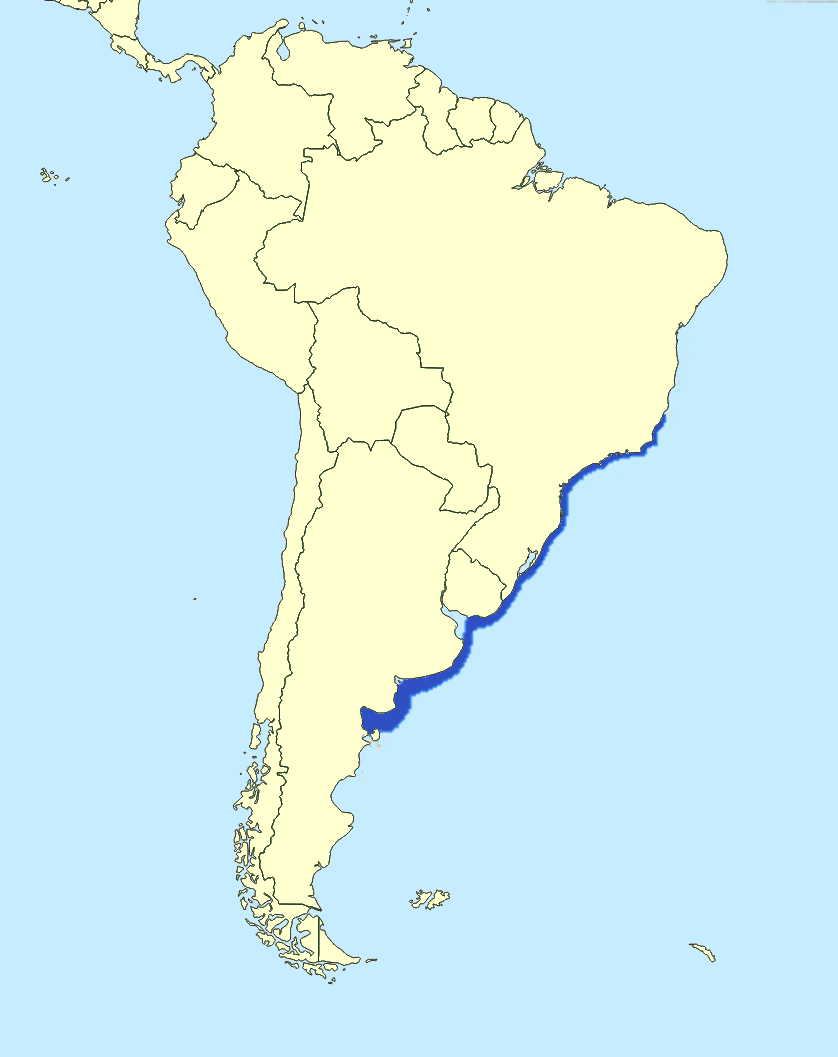

= Rio skate =

Species of cartilaginous fish

The rio skate (Rioraja agassizii) is a shallow water skate native to the Atlantic coast of South America from Brazil to southern Argentina. It is the only member of the monotypic genus Rioraja.

The species is named in honor of zoologist-geologist Louis Agassiz.
