= Megascyliorhinus =

Megascyliorhinus Temporal range: Ypresian–Piacenzian

Scientific classification
- Kingdom: Animalia
- Phylum: Chordata
- Class: Chondrichthyes
- Subclass: Elasmobranchii
- Division: Selachii
- Order: Carcharhiniformes
- Family: Scyliorhinidae
- Genus: †Megascyliorhinus; Cappetta and Ward, 1977

Type species
- Megascyliorhinus cooperi Cappetta and Ward, 1977

Other species
- Megascyliorhinus miocaenicus Antunes and Jonet, 1970 Megascyliorhinus trelewensis Cione, 1986

Extinct genus of scyliorhinid chondrichthyan

Megascyliorhinus is an extinct genus of scyliorhinid shark that lived from the Ypresian to the Piacenzian stages of the Palaeogene and Neogene periods.

== Distribution ==
Though present in the temperate part of the Pacific coast of South America in the Early Miocene, Megascyliorhinus disappeared from the region by the Middle Miocene.

== Description ==
Though once assumed to have lacked a pulp cavity, Megascyliorhinus miocaenicus has been shown by micro-CT scanning to have had an orthodont histotype.
