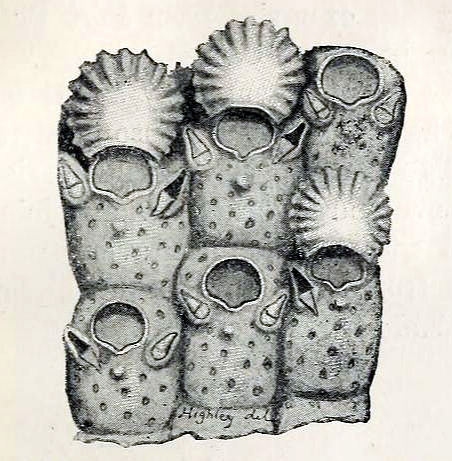
- Schizoporella unicornis (magnified)

Scientific classification
- Kingdom: Animalia
- Phylum: Bryozoa
- Class: Gymnolaemata
- Order: Cheilostomatida
- Suborder: Flustrina
- Superfamily: Schizoporelloidea
- Family: Schizoporellidae; Jullien, 1883

Genera
- Enoplostomella; Ferganula; Hipposera; Schizoporella; Schizobrachiella; Schizolepralia; Stylopoma

= Schizoporellidae =

Schizoporellidae Temporal range: Eocene - Recent

Family of moss animals

The Schizoporellidae is a family within the bryozoan order Cheilostomatida. Colonies are encrusting on shells and rocks or upright bilaminar branches or sheets. The zooidal orifice has a narrow V-shaped sinus.
