= Priscosiren =

Priscosiren Temporal range: Chattian

Scientific classification
- Domain: Eukaryota
- Kingdom: Animalia
- Phylum: Chordata
- Class: Mammalia
- Order: Sirenia
- Family: Dugongidae
- Genus: †Priscosiren; Velez-Juarbe and Domning, 2014

Species
- P. atlantica Velez-Juarbe and Domning, 2014 (type)

Extinct genus of mammal

Priscosiren is an extinct genus of sirenian mammal which existed in the west Atlantic and Puerto Rico during the late Oligocene (Chattian).

== Distribution ==
The type locality is the San Sebastián Limestone of Puerto Rico, with a record also known from the Chandler Bridge Formation of South Carolina, USA.

== Description ==
Priscosiren was diagnosed from other "halitheriine" dugongids by Velez-Juarbe and Domning (2014).

== Phylogeny ==
Priscosiren is recovered by Velez-Juarbe and Domning (2014) as sister to the Metaxytherium + Hydrodamalinae and Dugonginae clades.
