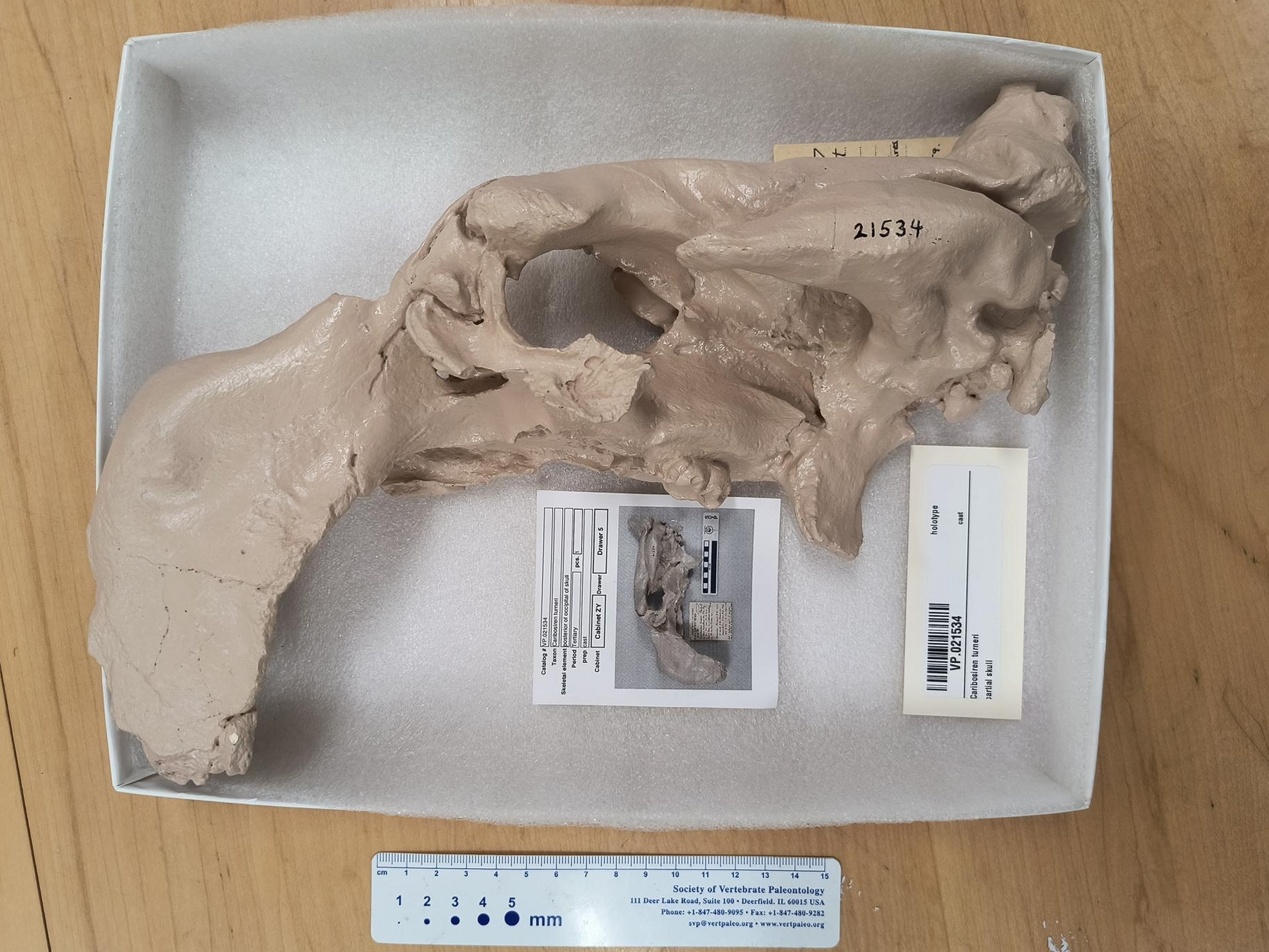

Scientific classification
- Kingdom: Animalia
- Phylum: Chordata
- Class: Mammalia
- Order: Sirenia
- Family: Dugongidae
- Genus: †Caribosiren; Reinhart, 1959

Species
- C. turneri Reinhart, 1959 (type)

= Caribosiren =

Caribosiren Temporal range: Chattian

Extinct genus of mammal

Caribosiren is an extinct genus of afrotherian mammal which existed in what is now Puerto Rico during the Chattian stage of the Oligocene epoch. Fossils have been recovered from the San Sebastián Limestone.

== Palaeobiology ==
=== Palaeoecology ===
Caribosiren, as suggested by its lack of tusks and its extreme snout deflection of 75°, was a dietary specialist that ate seagrass leaves and small rhizomes.
