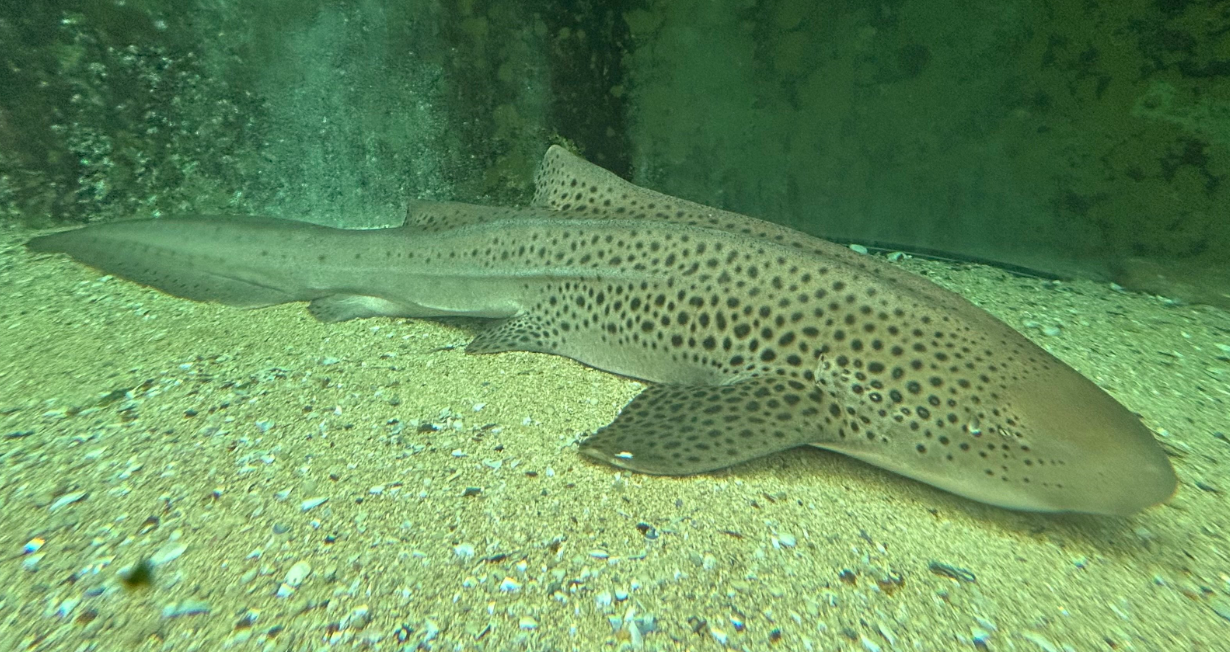

Conservation status
- Endangered (IUCN 3.1)

Scientific classification
- Kingdom: Animalia
- Phylum: Chordata
- Class: Chondrichthyes
- Subclass: Elasmobranchii
- Division: Selachii
- Order: Orectolobiformes
- Family: Stegostomatidae
- Genus: Stegostoma
- Species: S. tigrinum

Binomial name
- Stegostoma tigrinum (Forster, 1781)
- Range of the zebra shark

Synonyms
- List: Squalus varius Seba, 1759; Squalus tigrinus Forster, 1781; Squalus fasciatus Hermann, 1783; Stegostoma fasciatum (Hermann, 1783); Squalus longicaudus Gmelin, 1789; Scyllia quinquecornuatum van Hasselt, 1823; Scyllium heptagonum Rüppell, 1837; Stegostoma carinatum Blyth, 1847; Squalus pantherinus Kuhl & van Hasselt, 1852; Squalus cirrosus Gronow, 1854; Stegostoma varium Garman, 1913; Stegostoma tigrinum naucum Whitley, 1939

= Zebra shark =

Species of carpet sharks

The zebra shark (Stegostoma tigrinum), also known as the Indo-Pacific leopard shark, is a species of carpet shark and the only extant member of the family Stegostomatidae. It is found throughout the tropical Indo-Pacific, frequenting coral reefs and sandy flats to a depth of 62 m (200 ft). Zebra sharks are distinctive in appearance, with adults possessing five longitudinal ridges on a cylindrical body, a low caudal fin comprising nearly half the total length, and typically a pattern of dark spots on a pale background. Young zebra sharks under 50–90 cm (20–35 in) long have a completely different pattern, consisting of light vertical stripes on a brown background, and lack the ridges. This species attains a length of 2.5 m (8.2 ft).

Zebra sharks are nocturnal and spend most of the day resting motionless on the sea floor. At night, they actively hunt for molluscs, crustaceans, small bony fishes, and possibly sea snakes inside holes and crevices in the reef. Though solitary for most of the year, they form large seasonal aggregations. The zebra shark is oviparous: females produce several dozen large egg capsules, which they anchor to underwater structures via adhesive tendrils. Innocuous to humans and hardy in captivity, zebra sharks are popular subjects of ecotourism dives and public aquaria. The World Conservation Union has assessed this species as Endangered worldwide, as it is taken by commercial fisheries across most of its range (except off Australia) for meat, fins, and liver oil. There is evidence that its numbers are dwindling.

== Taxonomy ==
The genus name is derived from the Greek stego meaning "covered", and stoma meaning "mouth". The specific epithet fasciatum means "banded", referring to the striped pattern of the juvenile. The juvenile coloration is also the origin of the common name "zebra shark". The name "leopard shark" is sometimes applied to the spotted adult, but that name usually refers to the houndshark Triakis semifasciata, and is also sometimes used for the tiger shark (Galeocerdo cuvier). Due to their different color patterns and body proportions, both juveniles and subadults have historically been described as separate species (Squalus tigrinus and S. longicaudatus respectively).

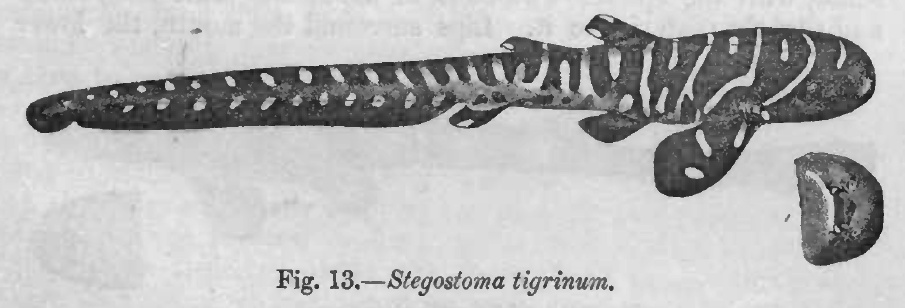
Early taxonomists thought that juvenile zebra sharks were a different species because of their different appearance from adults.

The zebra shark was first described as Squalus varius by Seba in 1757 (Seba died years earlier; the publication was posthumous). No type specimen was designated, though Seba included a comprehensive description in Latin and an accurate illustration of a juvenile. Müller and Henle placed this species in the genus Stegostoma in 1837, using the specific epithet fasciatus (or the neuter form fasciatum, as Stegostoma is neuter while Squalus is masculine) from an 1801 work by Bloch and Schneider. In 1984, Compagno rejected the name "varius/m" in favor of "fasciatus/m" for the zebra shark, because Seba did not consistently use binomial nomenclature in his species descriptions (though Squalus varius is one that can be construed as a binomial name). In Compagno's view, the first proper usage of "varius/m" was by Garman in 1913, making it a junior synonym. Both S. fasciatum and S. varium are currently in usage for this species; until the early 1990s most authorities used the latter name, but since then most have followed Compagno and used the former name. A taxonomic review in 2019 instead argued that S. tigrinum is its valid name. This name was omitted in Compagno's review in 1984, possibly due to confusion over its year of description (in a publication in 1941, Fowler mistakenly listed it as being described in 1795). Squalus tigrinus was described by Forster in 1781, two years before Squalus fasciatus was described by Hermann. Consequently, the former and older is the valid name (as Stegostoma tigrinum), while the latter and younger is its junior synonym. As the name proposed by Forster in 1781 has been used in tens of publications since 1899, it is not a nomen oblitum.

== Phylogeny ==
There is robust morphological support for the placement of the zebra shark, the whale shark (Rhincodon typus), and the nurse sharks (Ginglymostoma cirratum, Nebrius ferrugineus, and Pseudoginglymostoma brevicaudatum) in a single clade. However, the interrelationships between these taxa are disputed by various authors. Dingerkus (1986) suggested that the whale shark is the closest relative of the zebra shark, and proposed a single family encompassing all five species in the clade. Compagno (1988) suggested affinity between this species and either Pseudoginglymostoma or a clade containing Rhincodon, Ginglymostoma, and Nebrius. Goto (2001) placed the zebra shark as the sister group to a clade containing Rhincodon and Ginglymostoma.

== Description ==
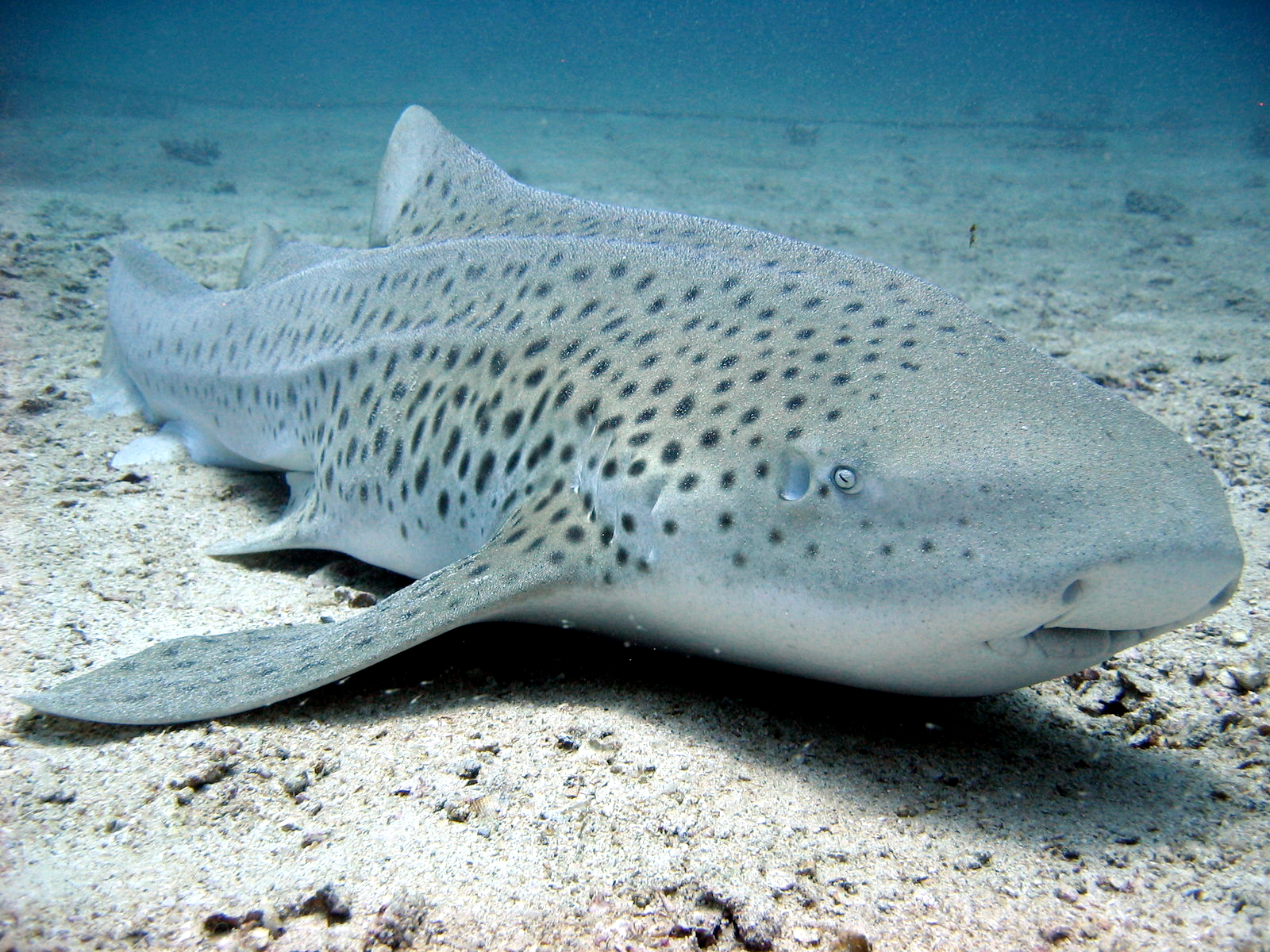

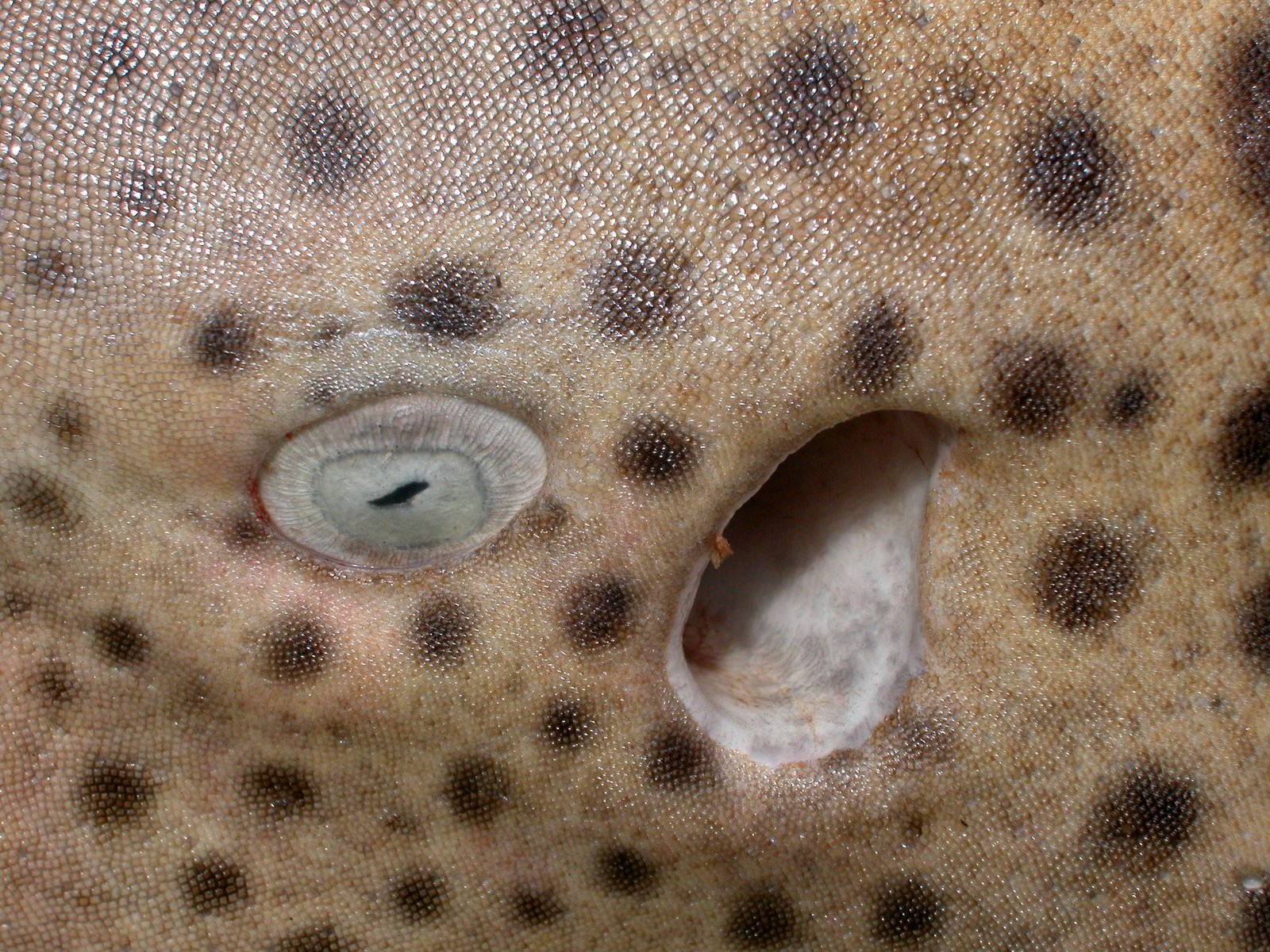
Adult zebra sharks have longitudinal ridges on the body, a spotted pattern, and small eyes with larger spiracles.

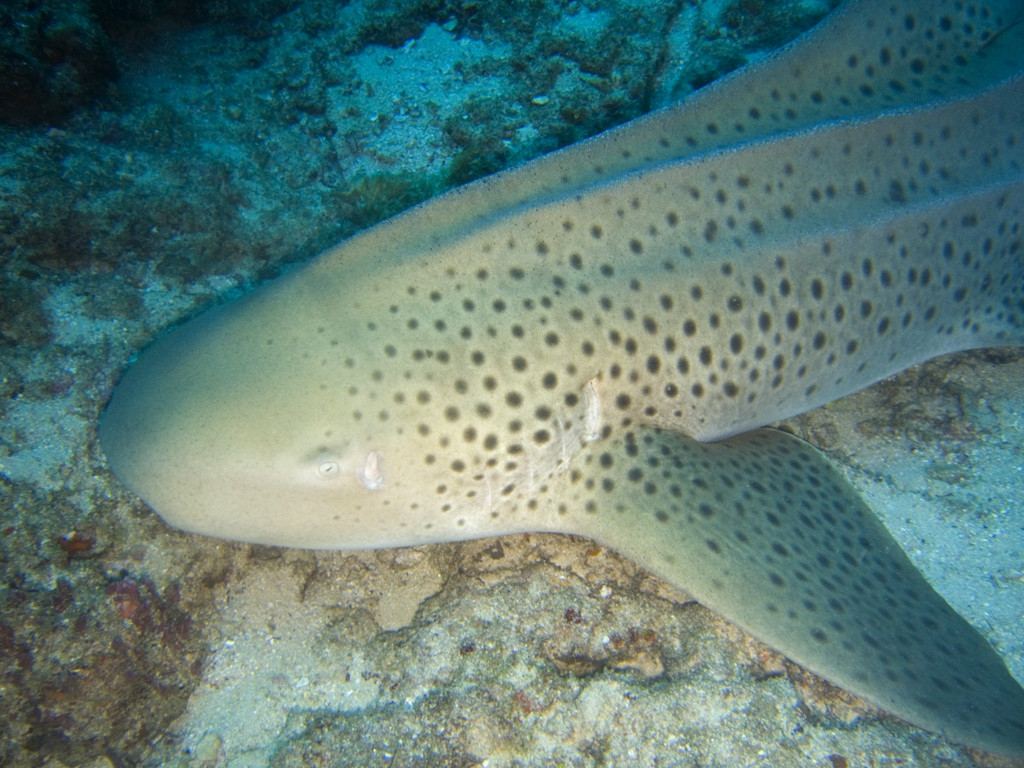
Close-up of zebra shark

The zebra shark has a cylindrical body with a large, slightly flattened head and a short, blunt snout. The eyes are small and placed on the sides of the head; the spiracles are located behind them and are as large or larger. The last 3 of the 5 short gill slits are situated over the pectoral fin bases, and the fourth and fifth slits are much closer together than the others. Each nostril has a short barbel and a groove running from it to the mouth. The mouth is nearly straight, with three lobes on the lower lip and furrows at the corners. There are 28–33 tooth rows in the upper jaw and 22–32 tooth rows in the lower jaw; each tooth has a large central cusp flanked by two smaller ones.

There are five distinctive ridges running along the body in adults, one along the dorsal midline and two on the sides. The dorsal midline ridge merges into the first dorsal fin, placed about halfway along the body and twice the size of the second dorsal fin. The pectoral fins are large and broad; the pelvic and anal fins are much smaller but larger than the second dorsal fin. The caudal fin is almost as long as the rest of the body, with a barely developed lower lobe and a strong ventral notch near the tip of the upper lobe. The zebra shark attains a length of 2.5 m (8 ft 2 in), with an unsubstantiated record of 3.5 m (11 ft 6 in). Males and females are not dimorphic in size.

The color pattern in young sharks is dark brown above and light yellow below, with vertical yellow stripes and spots. As the shark grows to 50–90 cm (20–35 in) long, the dark areas begin to break up, changing the general pattern from light-on-dark stripes to dark-on-light spots. There is substantial variation in pattern amongst adults, which can be used to identify particular individuals. A rare morph, informally called the sandy zebra shark, is overall sandy–brown in color with inconspicuous dark brown freckles on its upperside, lacking the distinct dark-spotted and banded pattern typical of the species. The appearance of juveniles of this morph is unknown, but subadults that are transitioning into adult sandy zebra sharks have a brown-netted pattern. Faint remnants of this pattern can often be seen in adult sandy zebra sharks. This morph, which is genetically inseparable from the normal morph, is only known from the vicinity of Malindi in Kenya, although seemingly similar individuals have been reported from Japan and northwestern Australia.

In 1964, a partially albino zebra shark was discovered in the Indian Ocean. It was overall white and completely lacked spots, but its eyes were blackish-brown as typical of the species and unlike full albinos. The shark, a 1.9 m (6 ft 3 in) long mature female, was unusual in that albino animals rarely survive long in the wild due to their lack of crypsis.

== Distribution and habitat ==
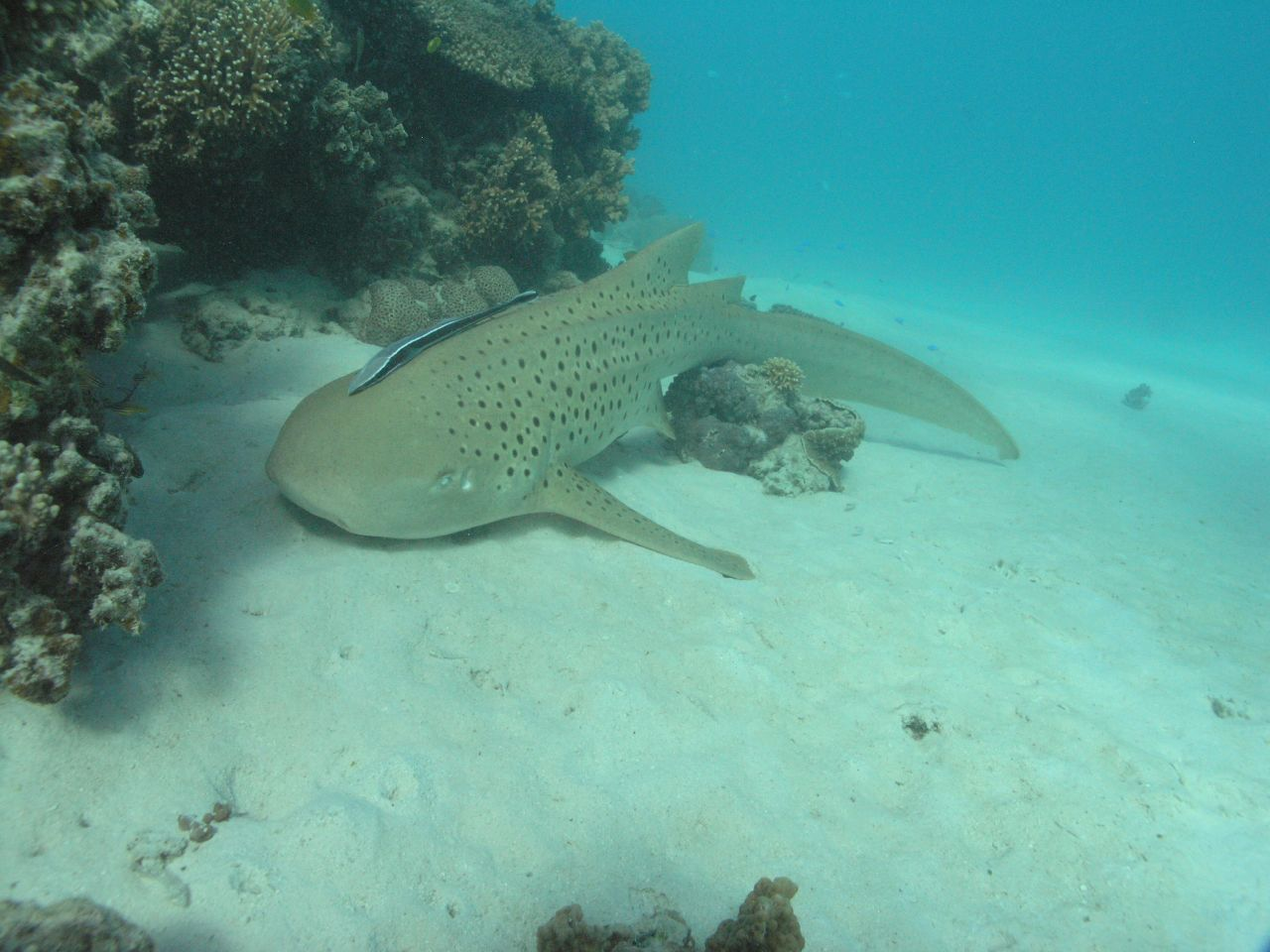
Zebra sharks are often seen resting on sand near coral.

The zebra shark occurs in the tropical waters of the Indo-Pacific region, from South Africa to the Red Sea and the Persian Gulf (including Madagascar and the Maldives), to India and Southeast Asia (including Indonesia, the Philippines, and Palau), northward to Taiwan and Japan, eastward to New Caledonia and Tonga, and southward to northern Australia.

Bottom-dwelling in nature, the zebra shark is found from the intertidal zone to a depth of 62 m (200 ft) over the continental and insular shelves. Adults and large juveniles frequent coral reefs, rubble, and sandy areas. There are unsubstantiated reports of this species from fresh water in the Philippines. Zebra sharks sometimes cross oceanic waters to reach isolated seamounts. Movements of up to 140 km (87 mi) have been recorded for individual sharks. However, genetic data indicates that there is little exchange between populations of zebra sharks, even if their ranges are contiguous.

== Biology and ecology ==
During the day, zebra sharks are sluggish and usually found resting on the sea bottom, sometimes using their pectoral fins to prop up the front part of their bodies and facing into the current with their mouths open to facilitate respiration. Reef channels are favored resting spots, since the tightened space yields faster, more oxygenated water. They become more active at night or when food becomes available. Zebra sharks are strong and agile swimmers, propelling themselves with pronounced anguilliform (eel-like) undulations of the body and tail. In a steady current, they have been seen hovering in place with sinuous waves of their tails.

The zebra shark feeds primarily on shelled molluscs, though it also takes crustaceans, small bony fishes, and possibly sea snakes. The slender, flexible body of this shark allows it to wriggle into narrow holes and crevices in search of food, while its small mouth and thickly muscled buccal cavity allow it to create a powerful suction force with which to extract prey. This species may be preyed upon by larger fishes (notably other, much larger sharks) and marine mammals. Known parasites of the zebra shark include four species of tapeworms in the genus Pedibothrium.

=== Social life ===
Zebra sharks are usually solitary, though aggregations of 20–50 individuals have been recorded. Off southeast Queensland, aggregations of several hundred zebra sharks form every summer in shallow water. These aggregations consist entirely of large adults, with females outnumbering males by almost three to one. The purpose of these aggregations is yet unclear; no definite mating behavior has been observed between the sharks. There is an observation of an adult male zebra shark biting the pectoral fin of another adult male and pushing him against the sea floor; the second male was turned on his back, and remained motionless for several minutes. This behavior resembles pre-copulatory behaviors between male and female sharks, and in both cases the biting and holding of the pectoral fin has been speculated to relate to one shark asserting dominance over the other.

=== Life history ===
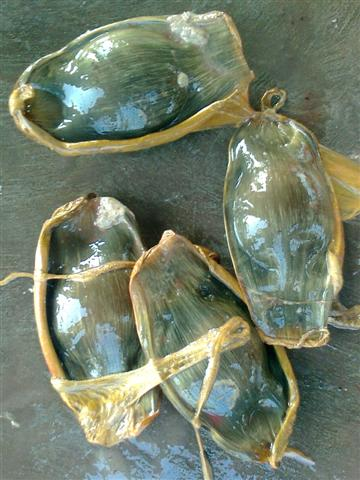
Several egg cases of the zebra shark

The courtship behavior of the zebra shark consists of the male following the female and biting vigorously at her pectoral fins and tail, with periods in which he holds onto her pectoral fin and both sharks lie still on the bottom. On occasion this leads to mating, in which the male curls his body around the female and inserts one of his claspers into her cloaca. Copulation lasts for two to five minutes. The zebra shark is oviparous, with females laying large egg capsules measuring 17 cm (6.7 in) long, 8 cm (3.1 in) wide, and 5 cm (2.0 in) thick. The egg case is dark brown to purple in color, and has hair-like fibers along the sides that secure it to the substrate. The adhesive fibers emerge first from the female's vent; the female circles vertical structures such as reef outcroppings to entangle the fibers, so as to anchor the eggs. Females have been documented laying up to 46 eggs over a 112-day period. Eggs are deposited in batches of around four. Reproductive seasonality in the wild is unknown.

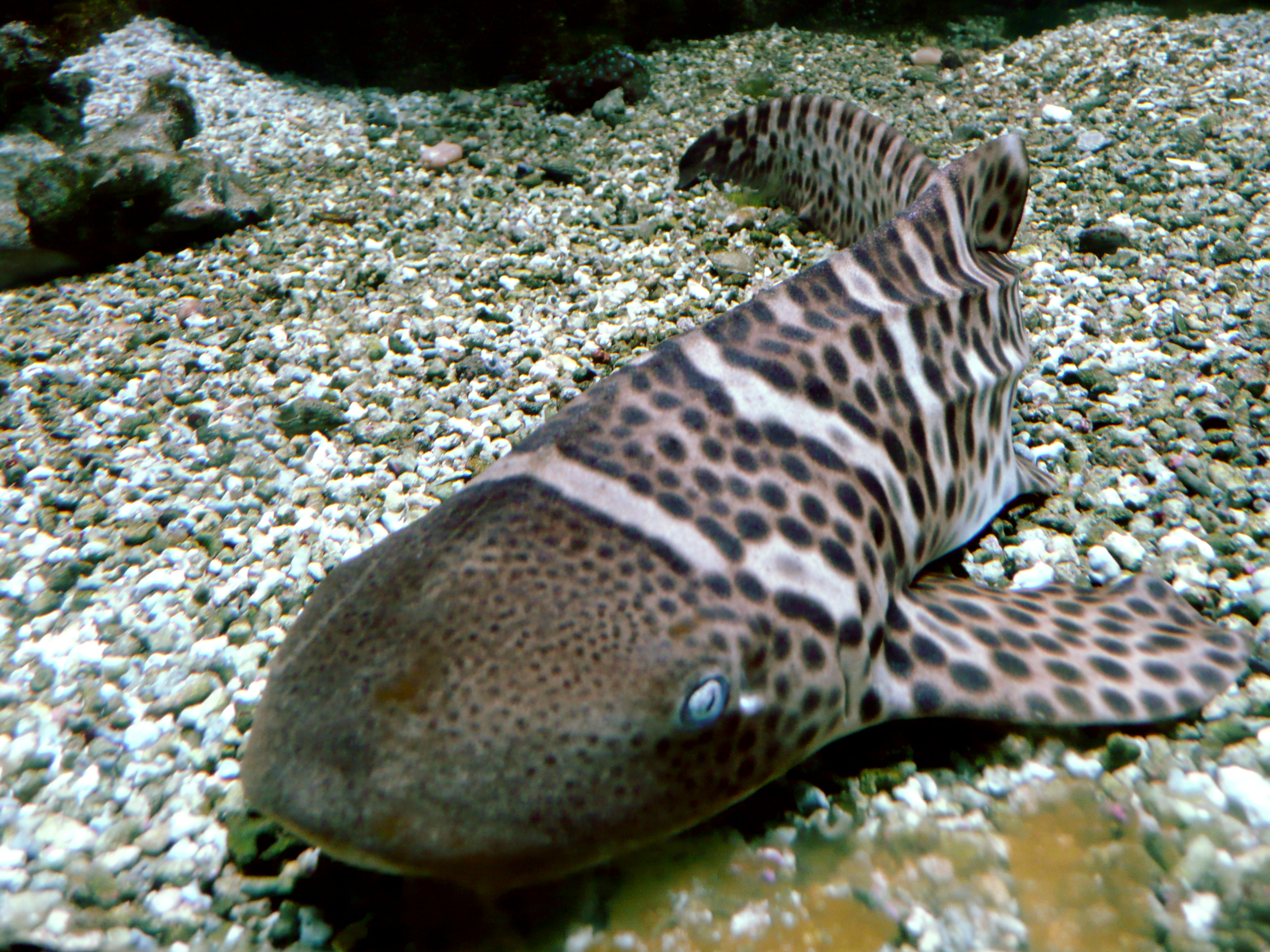
A juvenile zebra shark with a color pattern intermediate between that of young and adults

In captivity, the eggs hatch after four to six months, depending on temperature. The hatchlings measure 20–36 cm (7.9–14.2 in) long and have proportionately longer tails than adults. The habitat preferences of juveniles are unclear; one report places them at depths greater than 50 m (160 ft), while another report from India suggests they inhabit shallower water than adults. The stripes of the juveniles may have an anti-predator function, making each individual in a group harder to target. Males attain sexual maturity at 1.5–1.8 m (4.9–5.9 ft) long, and females at 1.7 m (5.6 ft) long. Their lifespan has been estimated to be 25–30 years in the wild. There have been two reports of female zebra sharks producing young asexually. An additional study has observed parthenogenesis in females regardless of sexual history.

== Human interactions ==
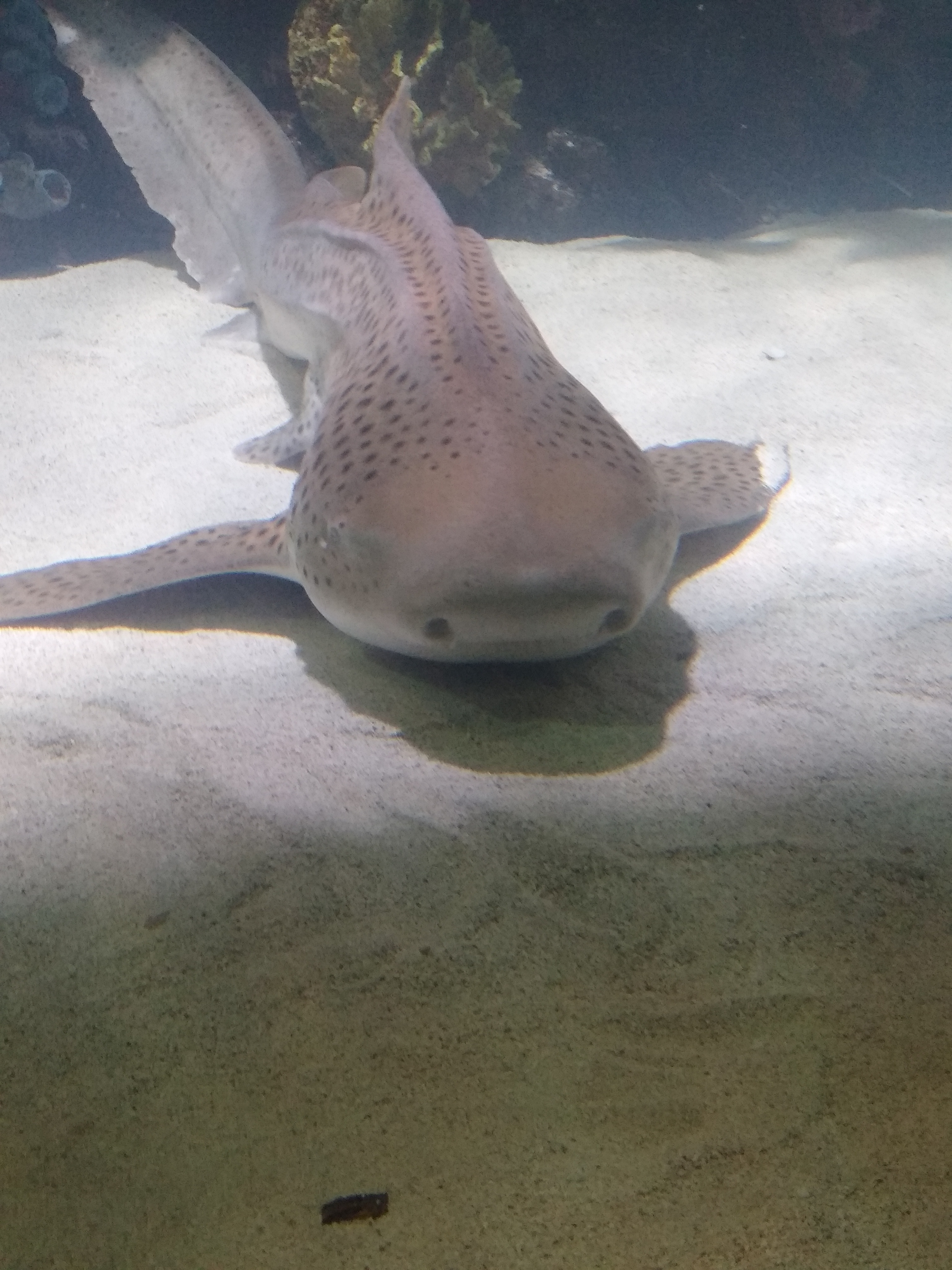
Female zebra shark at the Children's Aquarium at Fair Park

Docile and slow-moving, zebra sharks are not dangerous to humans and can be easily approached underwater. However, they have bitten divers who pull on their tails or attempt to ride them. As of 2008 there is one record of an unprovoked attack in the International Shark Attack File, though no injuries resulted. They are popular attractions for ecotourist divers in the Red Sea, off the Maldives, off Thailand's Phuket and Phi Phi islands, on the Great Barrier Reef, and elsewhere. Many zebra sharks at diving sites have become accustomed to the presence of humans, taking food from divers' hands and allowing themselves to be touched. The zebra shark adapts well to captivity and is displayed by a number of public aquaria around the world. The small, attractively colored young also find their way into the hands of private hobbyists, though this species grows far too large for the home aquarium.

The zebra shark is taken by commercial fisheries across most of its range, using bottom trawls, gillnets, and longlines. The meat is sold fresh or dried and salted for human consumption. Furthermore, the liver oil is used for vitamins, the fins for shark fin soup, and the offal for fishmeal. Zebra sharks are highly susceptible to localized depletion due to their shallow habitat and low levels of dispersal between populations, and market surveys suggest that they are much less common now than in the past. They are also threatened by the degradation of their coral reef habitat by human development, and by destructive fishing practices such as dynamiting or poisoning. As a result, the IUCN Red List has this species categorized as Endangered. Off Australia, the only threat to this species is a very low level of bycatch in prawn trawls, and there it has been assessed as of Least Concern.
