= Tawny nurse shark =

- At the Comoros Islands

Conservation status
- Vulnerable (IUCN 3.1)

Scientific classification
- Kingdom: Animalia
- Phylum: Chordata
- Class: Chondrichthyes
- Subclass: Elasmobranchii
- Division: Selachii
- Order: Orectolobiformes
- Family: Ginglymostomatidae
- Genus: Nebrius
- Species: N. ferrugineus

Binomial name
- Nebrius ferrugineus (Lesson, 1831)
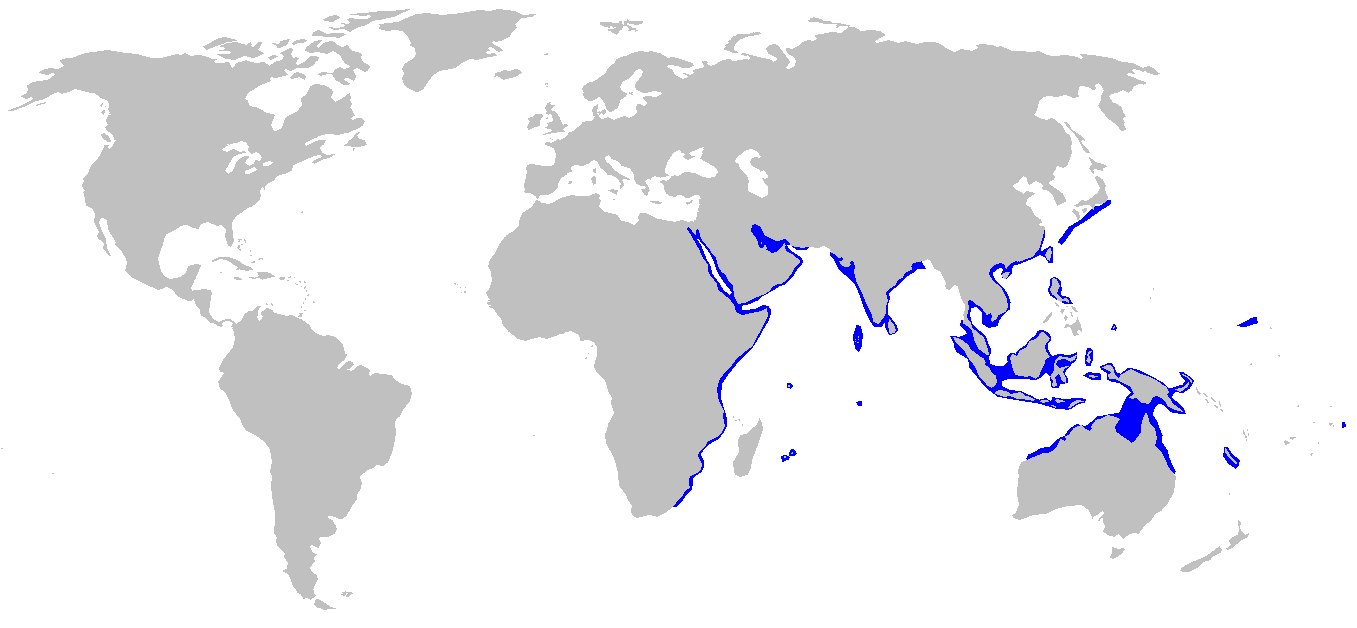
- Range of the tawny nurse shark

Synonyms
- List: Ginglymostoma muelleri Günther, 1870; Ginglymostoma rueppellii Bleeker, 1852; Nebrius concolor Rüppell, 1837; Nebrius doldi Smith, 1953; Nebrodes concolor ogilbyi Whitley, 1934; Nebrodes macrurus Garman, 1913; Scyllium ferrugineum Lesson, 1831; Scymnus porosus Ehrenberg, 1871

Species of shark

The tawny nurse shark (Nebrius ferrugineus) is a species of carpet shark in the family Ginglymostomatidae, and the only extant member of the genus Nebrius.

It is found widely along coastlines in the Indo-Pacific, preferring reefs, sandy flats, and seagrass beds from very shallow water to a depth of 70 metres (230 ft). With a cylindrical body and a broad, flattened head, the tawny nurse shark is quite similar in appearance to the nurse shark (Ginglymostoma cirratum) of the Atlantic and East Pacific, from which it can be distinguished by its pointed-tipped dorsal fins and narrow, sickle-shaped pectoral fins. The maximum recorded length of the tawny nurse shark is 3.2 m (10 ft).

Nocturnal in habits, the tawny nurse shark tends to spend the day resting in piles of two dozen or more individuals inside caves or under ledges. At night, it is an active-swimming predator that uses a powerful suction force to extract prey from inside holes and crevices. The diet of this species consists mainly of octopus, though they also take other invertebrates, small bony fishes, and rarely sea snakes. It is aplacental viviparous, meaning the embryos hatch from egg capsules inside the mother. It is the only carpet shark in which the embryos are oophagous, feeding on eggs produced by the mother while inside the uterus. The litter size may be as small as one or two, based on the large size of near-term embryos.

Compared to the nurse shark, the tawny nurse shark has a more placid disposition and will often allow divers to touch and play with it. However, it should be accorded respect due to its powerful jaws and sharp teeth. This species is caught by commercial fisheries across most of its range for meat, fins, liver oil, leather, and fishmeal. It is also esteemed as a game fish off Queensland, Australia, and is known for its habit of spitting water in the faces of its captors. The International Union for Conservation of Nature (IUCN) has assessed the tawny nurse shark as Vulnerable, with subpopulations in several areas already diminished or extirpated.

== Taxonomy and phylogeny ==
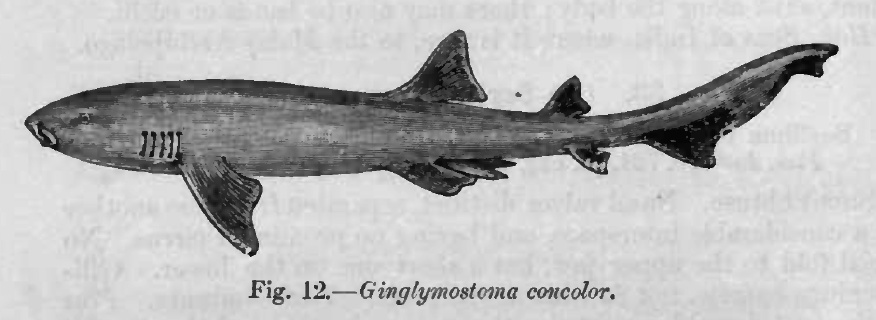
Early illustration of a tawny nurse shark from Fauna of British India (1889)

The tawny nurse shark was first described by French naturalist René-Primevère Lesson as Scyllium ferrugineum, based on a 1.4 m (4 ft 7 in) long specimen from New Guinea. His short account was published in 1831 in Voyage au tour du monde, sur la corvette La Coquille. A more detailed description, along with an illustration, was published by German naturalist Eduard Rüppell in 1837 as Nebrius concolor, based on a specimen from the Red Sea. Both names were retained, often in separate genera (Ginglymostoma and Nebrius respectively), until they were synonymized by Leonard Compagno in 1984. Compagno recognized that the tooth shape differences used to separate these species were the result of differences in age, with N. concolor representing younger individuals.

The genus name Nebrius is derived from the Greek word nebris or nebridos, meaning the skin of a fawn. The specific epithet ferrugineus is Latin for "rust-colored". Other common names for this species include giant sleepy shark, Madame X (a name coined by the shark fisherman Norman Caldwell in the 1930s for the then-unidentified Australian specimens), nurse shark, rusty catshark, rusty shark, sleepy shark, spitting shark, and tawny shark. Based on morphological similarities, Nebrius is believed to be the sister genus of Ginglymostoma, with both being placed in a clade that also contains the short-tail nurse shark (Pseudoginglymostoma brevicaudatum), the whale shark (Rhincodon typus), and the zebra shark (Stegostoma tigrinum).

== Distribution and habitat ==
The tawny nurse shark is widely distributed in the Indo-Pacific region. In the Indian Ocean, it is found from KwaZulu-Natal, South Africa northward to the Red Sea, Persian Gulf and India, including Madagascar, Mauritius, the Chagos Archipelago, the Seychelles, and the Maldives. In the western Pacific, it occurs from southern Japan and the coast of China to the Philippines, Southeast Asia, and Indonesia, to as far south as the northern coast of Australia. In the central Pacific, it has been reported from off New Caledonia, Samoa, Palau, the Marshall Islands, and Tahiti. Fossil teeth belonging to this species have been found in the Pirabas Formation of northern Brazil, dating back to the Lower Miocene (23–16 Ma). The presence of these fossils indicates that the range of the tawny nurse shark once extended to the tropical Atlantic Ocean, prior to the formation of the Isthmus of Panama.

An inshore species, the tawny nurse shark inhabits continental and insular shelves over sandy flats or beds of seagrass, as well as along the outer edges of coral or rocky reefs. This shark may be found from the surf zone, often in water barely deep enough to cover its body, to a maximum depth of 70 m (230 ft) on coral reefs; it is most common at a depth of 5–30 m (20–100 ft). Young sharks are generally found in the shallow areas of lagoons, while adults may be encountered across a variety of habitats.

== Description ==
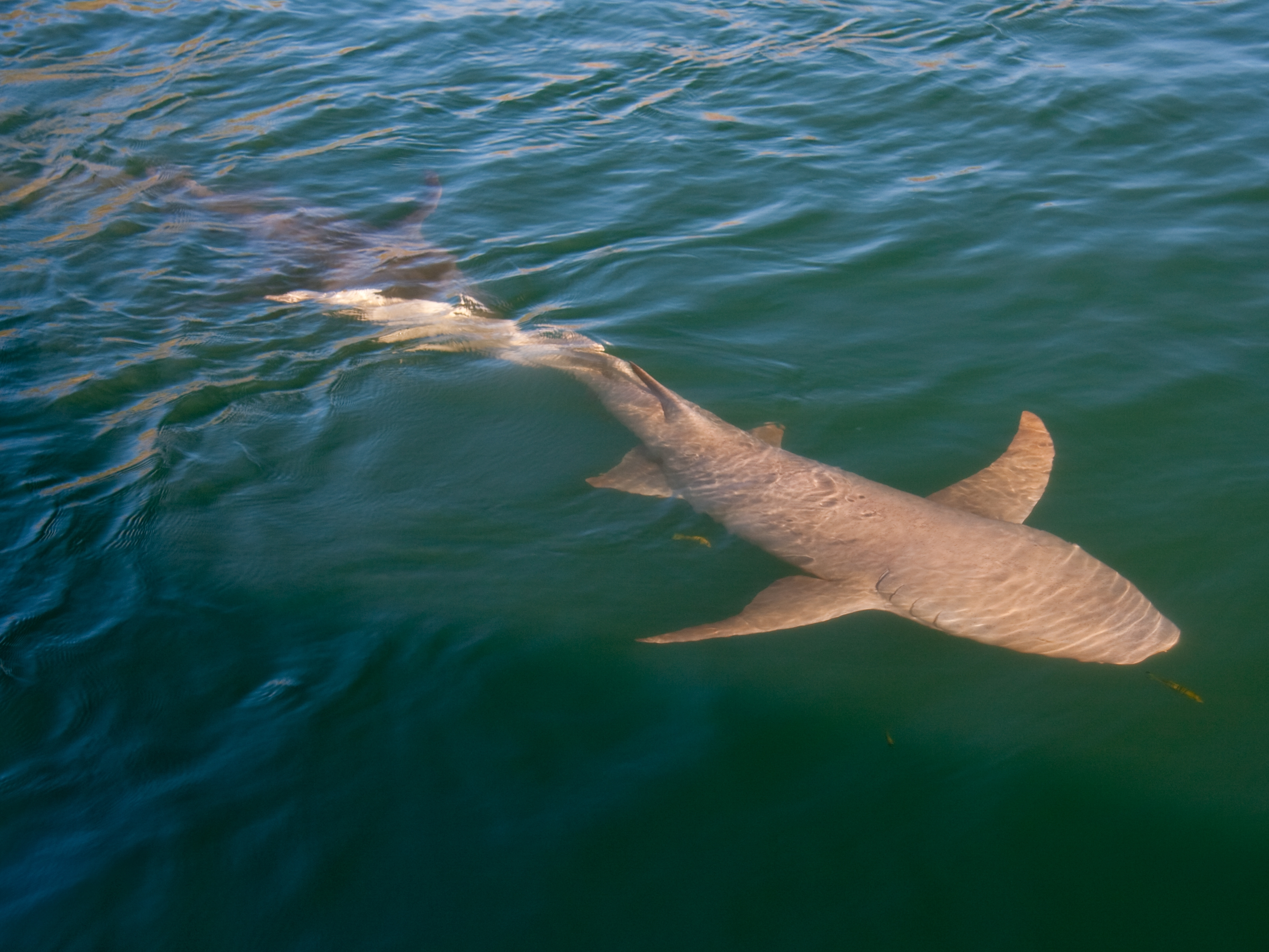
The sickle-shaped pectoral fins of the tawny nurse shark are one of its characteristic traits.

The tawny nurse shark grows to a maximum length of 3.2 m (10 ft). It has a robust, cylindrical body with a broadly rounded and flattened head. The eyes are small and face laterally, with prominent ridges over them and smaller spiracles behind. There are a pair of long, slender barbels in front of the nostrils. The mouth is small, with the lower lip divided into three lobes. There are 29–33 tooth rows in the upper jaw and 26–28 tooth rows in the lower jaw, arranged in an imbricate (overlapping) pattern with the outermost 2–4 functional rows separated from the rest by a narrow space. Each tooth resembles a fan, with a broad base rising to a small, sharp central point flanked by 3 or more smaller cusps on both sides. As the shark ages, the teeth become relatively taller and thicker. The fourth and fifth pairs of gill slits are placed much closer together than the others.

The dorsal and pelvic fins are angular, with the first dorsal fin larger than the second. The pectoral fins are narrow, pointed, and falcate (sickle-shaped); their shape separates this species from the similar-looking nurse shark. The origin of the first dorsal fin is about even with the origin of the pelvic fins, while the origin of the anal fin is even with or somewhat behind the origin of the second dorsal fin. The caudal fin has a shallow upper lobe and barely present lower lobe, comprising about a quarter of the total length in adults. The dermal denticles are diamond-shaped, bearing 4–5 faint ridges radiating from a blunt point. Tawny nurse sharks are yellowish, reddish, or grayish brown above and off-white below, and are capable of slowly changing their color to better blend with the environment. Young sharks have starkly white lower eyelids.

Many tawny nurse sharks found off the coasts of Japan, Taiwan, and the Ryukyu Islands lack a second dorsal fin. This physical abnormality has been speculated to result from pregnant females being exposed to water of unusually high salinity and/or temperature, possibly from human activity. In 1986, a 2.9 m (9 ft 6 in) long adult male with both a missing dorsal fin and partial albinism (in the form of white body color with gray-brown eyes) was captured off Wakayama Prefecture, Japan. This anomalous individual is the largest albino shark known to date, having survived for a long time in the wild despite its lack of camouflage.

== Biology and ecology ==
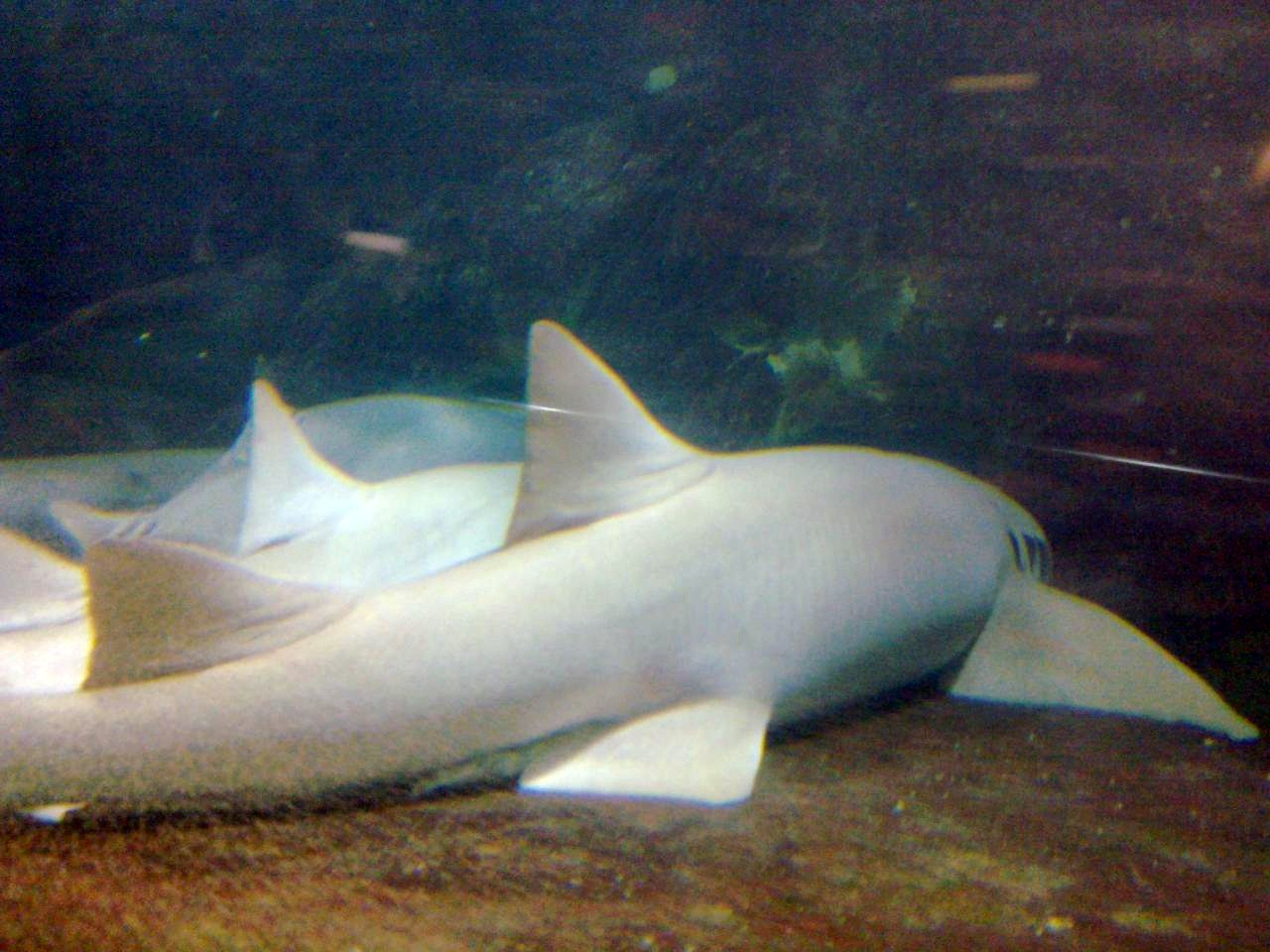
Tawny nurse sharks often rest piled together during the day.

With a more streamlined form than other nurse sharks, the tawny nurse shark is believed to be a less benthic, more active swimmer. The characteristics of its body, head, fins, and teeth are comparable to other active reef sharks sharing its range, such as the sicklefin lemon shark (Negaprion acutidens). Tawny nurse sharks are primarily nocturnal, though they are said to be active at all hours off Madagascar, and in captivity they will become diurnally active if presented with food. During the day, groups of two dozen or more sharks can be found resting inside caves and under ledges, often stacked atop one another. Individual sharks have small home ranges that they consistently return to each day.

The tawny nurse shark has few natural predators; attacks on this species have been reported from bull sharks (Carcharhinus leucas) and great hammerheads (Sphyrna mokarran), while the related nurse shark has been known to fall prey to tiger sharks (Galeocerdo cuvier) and lemon sharks (Negaprion brevirostris). Known parasites of this species include five species of tapeworms in the genus Pedibothrium, which infest the shark's spiral intestine.

=== Feeding ===
The tawny nurse shark may be one of the few fishes specializing in preying on octopus. Other known food items include corals, sea urchins, crustaceans (e.g. crabs and lobsters), squid, small fishes (e.g. surgeonfish, queenfish, and rabbitfish), and the occasional sea snake. Hunting tawny nurse sharks swim slowly just above the sea floor, poking their heads into depressions and holes. When a prey item is found, the shark forcefully expands its large, muscular pharynx, creating a powerful negative pressure that sucks the prey into its mouth.

=== Life history ===
Mating in the tawny nurse shark is known to occur from July to August off Madagascar. Adult females have one functional ovary and two functional uteruses. The mode of reproduction is aplacental viviparity, meaning that the embryos hatch inside the uterus; females in captivity have been documented depositing up to 52 non-viable egg capsules, which has led to erroneous reports of this shark being oviparous. The egg capsules of this species are onion-shaped, with thin, brown, translucent shells. The tawny nurse shark is the only carpet shark in which there is oophagy: once the developing embryos exhaust their supply of yolk, they gorge on eggs produced by the mother and acquire the distended abdomen characteristic of such oophagous embryos. Unlike in mackerel sharks, the eggs consumed by the embryos are large and shelled rather than small and undeveloped. There is no evidence of sibling cannibalism as in the sand tiger shark (Carcharias taurus).

Various authors have reported the length at birth anywhere from 40 to 80 cm (16 to 31 in), with the discrepancy possibly reflecting geographic variation. Although females release up to four fertilized eggs into each uterus, the very large size of the newborns suggest that the litter size may be as few as one or two. In one examined female that had two embryos sharing a single uterus, one embryo was much smaller and thinner than the other, implying that competition may eliminate the additional siblings. Males attain sexual maturity at a length of 2.5 m (8 ft 2 in), and females at a length of 2.3–2.9 m (7 ft 7 in – 9 ft 6 in).

== Human interactions ==
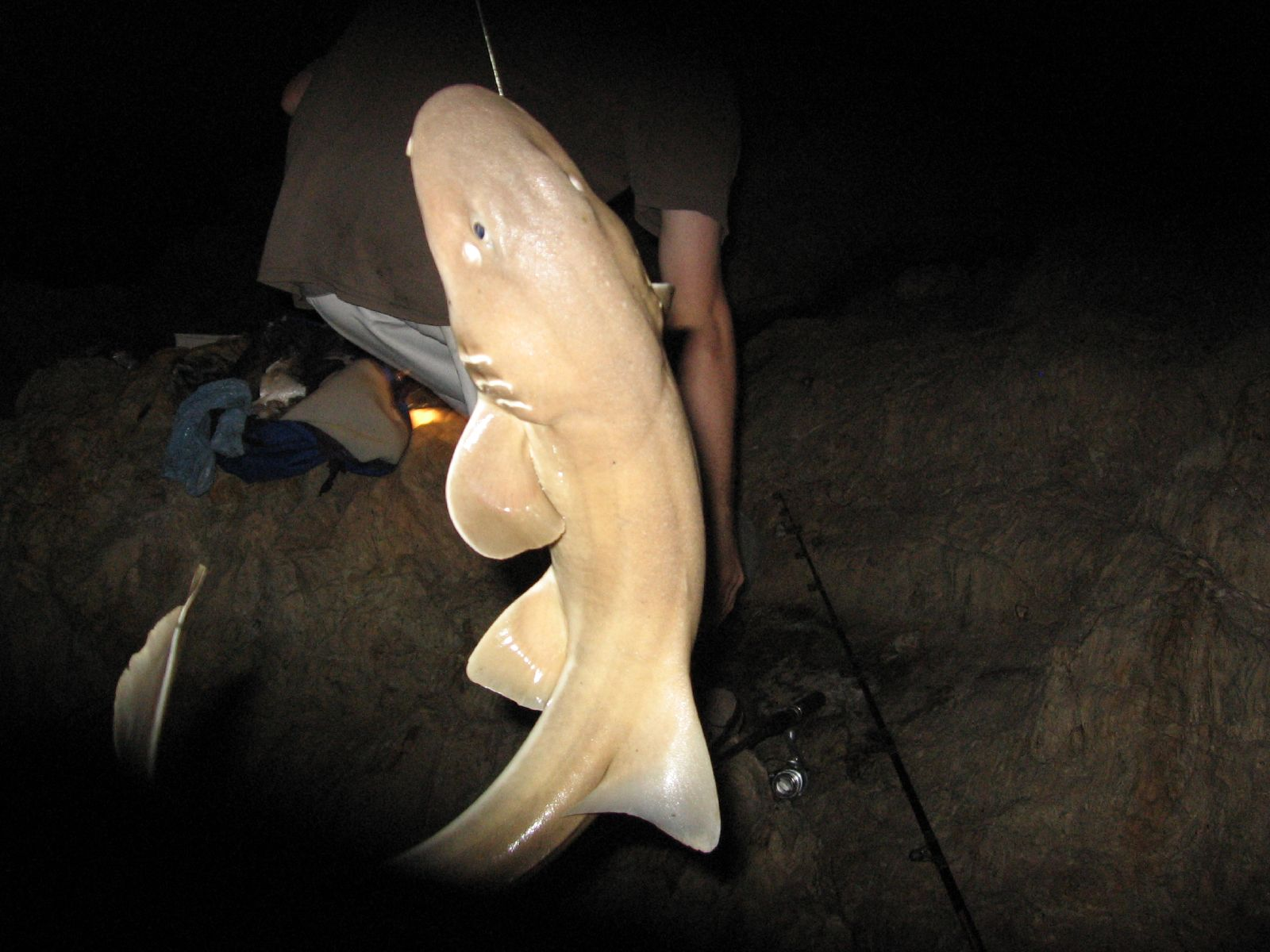
The tawny nurse shark is prized by recreational anglers off Queensland.

Encounters with tawny nurse sharks underwater indicate a more docile demeanor than the similar nurse shark; usually divers are able to approach the sharks closely and even touch and play with them without incident. However, this species has been infrequently provoked into biting, and merits respect due to its strength, small but sharp teeth, and extremely powerful jaws. Tawny nurse sharks are favored attractions for ecotourist divers off Thailand, the Solomon Islands, and elsewhere. This species also adapts well to captivity and is displayed in public aquaria in Europe, the United States, Okinawa, and Singapore, where they may become tame enough to be hand-fed. An Australian woman was bitten while hand feeding them in 2018.

The tawny nurse shark is taken by commercial fisheries operating throughout its range, including off Pakistan, India, Thailand, and the Philippines; an exception is in Australian waters, where it is only taken in small numbers as bycatch. This shark is caught using demersal trawls, floating and fixed bottom gill nets, and on hook-and-line. The meat is sold fresh or dried and salted, the fins are used for shark fin soup, and the offal processed into fishmeal. In addition, the liver is a source of oil and vitamins, and the thick, tough skin is made into leather products. Off Queensland, Australia, the tawny nurse shark is valued by big-game anglers. When hooked, large individuals are tenacious opponents and are difficult to subdue due to their habit of spinning. They are also capable of spitting a powerful jet of water into the faces of their captors, making grunting noises in between jets (making the tawny shark one of the few species of sharks to produce a noise); whether this is a deliberate defensive behavior is uncertain.

The International Union for Conservation of Nature (IUCN) has assessed the tawny nurse shark as Vulnerable worldwide, as it faces heavy fishing pressure and its low reproductive and dispersal rates limit the ability of over-exploited populations to recover. Furthermore, this shark's inshore habitat renders it susceptible to habitat degradation, destructive fishing practices (e.g. poisons and explosives, especially prevalent off Indonesia and the Philippines), and human harassment. Localized declines or extirpations of the tawny nurse shark have been documented off India and Thailand. Off Australia, this species has been assessed as of Least Concern, as there it is not targeted by fisheries.
