= Pacific nurse shark =

- In Panama

Conservation status
- Endangered (IUCN 3.1)

Scientific classification
- Kingdom: Animalia
- Phylum: Chordata
- Class: Chondrichthyes
- Subclass: Elasmobranchii
- Division: Selachii
- Order: Orectolobiformes
- Family: Ginglymostomatidae
- Genus: Ginglymostoma
- Species: G. unami

Binomial name
- Ginglymostoma unami Del-Moral-Flores, Ramírez-Antonio, Angulo & Pérez-Ponce de León, 2015
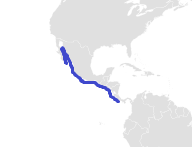
- Range of the Pacific nurse shark

Species of shark

The pacific nurse shark (Ginglymostoma unami) is a medium sized shark from the family Ginglymostomatidae. The species is endemic to the Tropical Eastern Pacific, and is not to be confused with its sister species Ginglymostoma cirratum, which is restricted to the Atlantic Ocean. G. unami has the characteristic round, elongated body and fin shape of nurse sharks, which can be useful when identifying them in aerial image data. The species has a wide habitat range, including the Gulf of California, Costa Rica, Peru, and Panama. However, Pacific nurse sharks are considered endangered, and they are threatened by fishing practices like many other shark species. They have also been observed to disperse over long distances away from their home ranges, though they also exhibit high site fidelity. Therefore, researchers focus on the importance of better studying and tracking the sharks, often using aerial imaging data, in order to improve policies and protections regarding them.

== Etymology ==
The species name unami comes from the acronym of la Universidad Nacional Autónoma de México (UNAM), or the National Autonomous University of Mexico.

== Taxonomy ==
The Pacific nurse shark was first described in 2015 based on the holotype specimen caught near Puerto Angel in Mexico, as previously, the species had been considered the same as Ginglymostoma cirratum.

== Distribution and habitat ==
G. unami is endemic to the Tropical Eastern Pacific, from the Southern coast of Baja California, Mexico and the Gulf of California to Peru. The species has been observed and tracked in Mexico, Panama, Costa Rica, and Peru.

The species is also known to be highly mobile, traveling up to 390 km from their home-range. They can swim back and forth between different sites in response to ecological drivers, making full ecological use of their habitat. They spend almost all their time at the bottom of the water. They live in shallow waters, with sandy and rocky bottoms, and can often be found near rocky or coral reefs, and mangrove forests. They are often sighted in warm, calm embayments like the Santa Elena Bay in Costa Rica.

== Description ==
In Panama

They have elongated, slightly depressed bodies that are widest towards the anterior, and they have rounded fins. Their iconic body shape with a broad head, short pectoral fins, long tail, and two dorsal fins is valued in conservation research, since it makes the pacific nurse shark easy to identify from aerial surveys. Their broad, round snouts, which are shorter than the interorbital distance, are characterized by a small inferior mouth and long barbels around their nose. Their eyes, gills, and spiracles sit on the dorsal side of their body, likely due to their benthic lifestyle. As for coloration, they appear in varying shades of brown with yellow undertones and a light belly, and juveniles have a spotted pattern along their dorsal region.

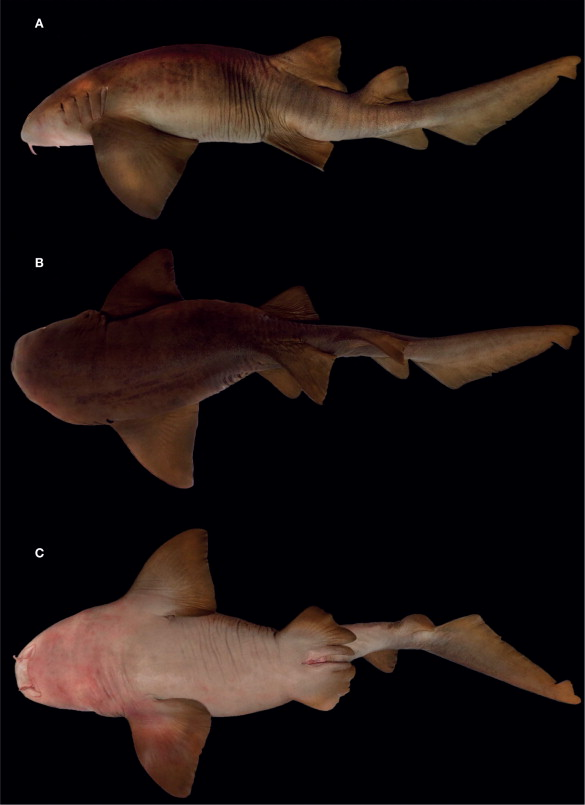
Adult, showing lateral, dorsal, and ventral views

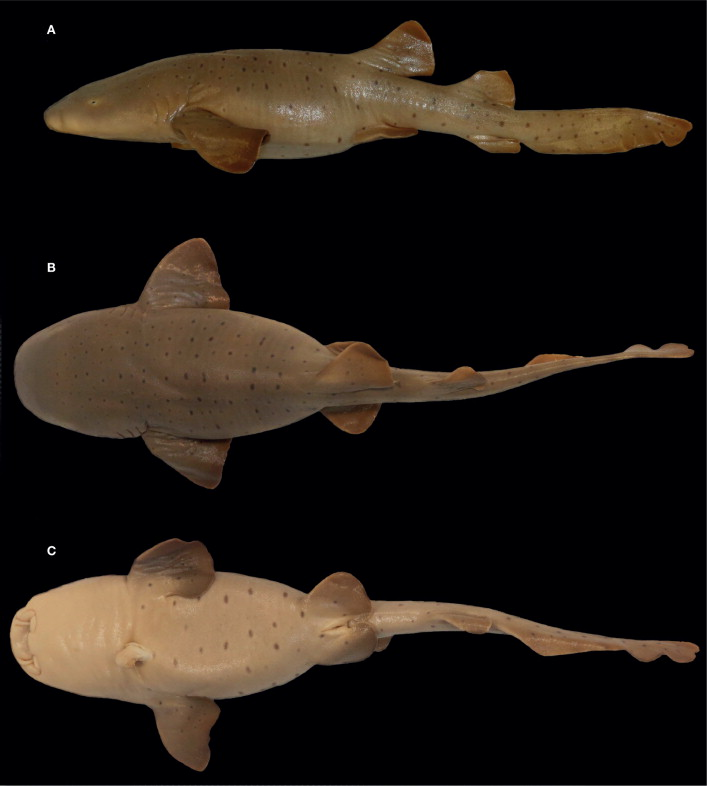
Juvenile, showing lateral, dorsal, and ventral views

Furthermore, G. unami can be distinguished from their close relatives due to their unique habitats and a few defining characteristics. Notably, G. unami has a shorter distance between the prebranchial and interdorsal region, as well as a shorter space between the second dorsal fin and caudal lobe than its Atlantic counterpart. G. unami also uniquely has the ends of its pelvic fins reach the origin of the second dorsal fin when pressed against the body. Their teeth are another trait which help differentiate them from G. cirratum. They have a high central cusp, with more secondary cusps placed symmetrically to the central one. Their dermal denticles are also distinct, with a rhombus shape and 5 to 6 keels (G. cirratum has longer dermal denticles with fewer keels).

== Biology ==
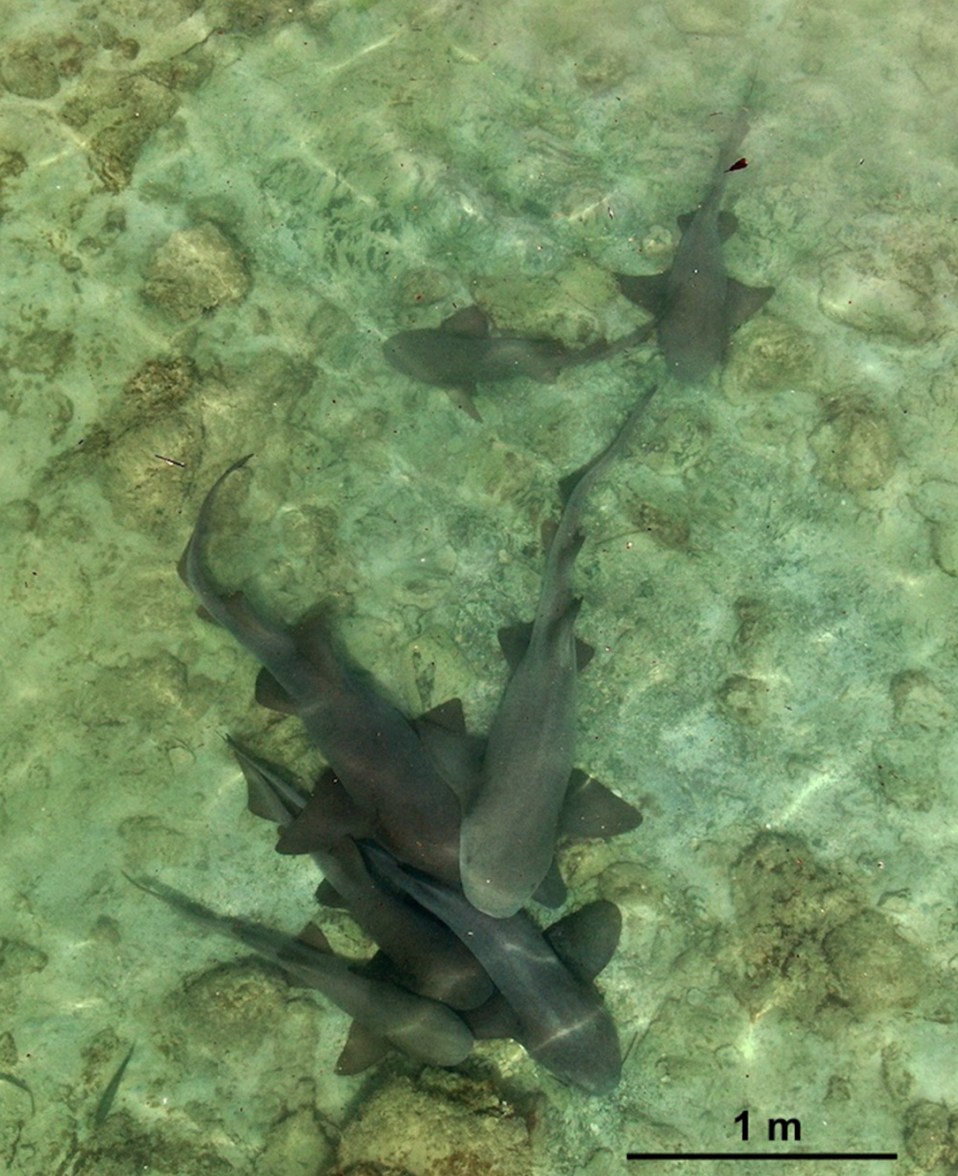
Group huddling together

As benthic predators, nurse sharks feed on small bony fishes and invertebrates like squids, octopuses, crabs, sea urchins, lobsters, and shrimps. With their ventrally-located mouth, nurse sharks are observed to perform suction feeding to capture their prey, similar to bony fishes. With modified structures of their skull and mouth, they can generate one of the greatest suction pressures of any aquatic-feeding vertebrate. However, the suction is only effective within a close distance, so sharks must forage close to reefs or substrate, likely using on ambush or stalking predation. Family Ginglymostomatidae also use these suction structures to facilitate buccal pumping respiration, which allows them to rest on the bottom of the seafloor without needing to swim to breathe.

This sedentary behavior can be observed when pacific nurse sharks aggregate in small numbers around their feeding grounds. Aggregation is the event where two or more individuals appear in the same place at the same time, usually seeking beneficial environmental conditions. G. cirratum is known to aggregate for reproductive reasons, but the behavior is understudied in G. unami. One explanation is that pacific nurse sharks gather together as a response to changing water temperatures, since upwelling is common in their Pacific habitats. Upwelling can cause water temperatures to drop to 16 °C from the normal 28 °C. The sharks aggregate together more during upwelling seasons in groups of up to 52 individuals in warm, shallow waters. Pacific nurse sharks specifically practice huddling behavior, where they will physically touch bodies, further suggesting they aggregate for thermoregulation or social reasons. Other possible reasons that influence aggregation may be conspecific attraction, mating, prey availability, or predator avoidance.

Despite this sedentary behavior, studies on pacific nurse shark lifestyle also describe their ability to travel much larger distances than previously thought. Some studies report the sharks making up to 390 km journeys, and traveling back and forth between a few different sites over the course of 46 days near the coast of Costa Rica. Seasonal upwelling may be the driver of their movement as well, as the sharks will migrate to warmer waters for refuge. This creates a pattern of site fidelity to the Santa Elena Bay in Costa Rica, which is known as an important conservational area for many species of elasmobranchs. They travel to the bay during the upwelling season, and even move between different parts of the bay based on the time of day and temperature, demonstrating a thermoregulatory behavior.

Nurse sharks are known to be ovoviviparous, with the embryos gestating within egg capsules, then hatching within the female. However not much is known about the courtship or breeding behaviors of pacific nurse sharks. The species is highly understudied, and much of their biology remains unclear.

== Conservation status ==
The pacific nurse shark has most recently been assessed in 2019 and is currently labeled as endangered under the IUCN red list of endangered species. This is due to continuing declining populations, human impacts through fisheries, and habitat destruction. Fisheries pose a particular concern for chondrichthyans in many countries within the species’ distribution, and G. unami has been known to be caught as bycatch or get fatally tangled in nets. In Peru, for example, elasmobranch products are regularly traded within the country, and although there are no known commercial uses of Pacific nurse sharks, fisheries can lack proper identification on bycatch, leading to the exploitation of many shark species. Unfortunately, little research has been done on G. unami due to its recent species description. Its sister species, G. cirratum, has more extensive literature on it, but this often excludes G. unami. Thus, current conservationists are particularly worried about improving the available data for the species, including using improved aerial imagery technology or passive acoustic telemetry to monitor their movement and appearance. Tracking the sharks’ movement and behavior can help improve conservation and management efforts in the regions where they live. Certain regions of their habitat are classified as protected areas, but since they often travel outside of these areas, they may be left vulnerable. Additional research can improve their conservation.
