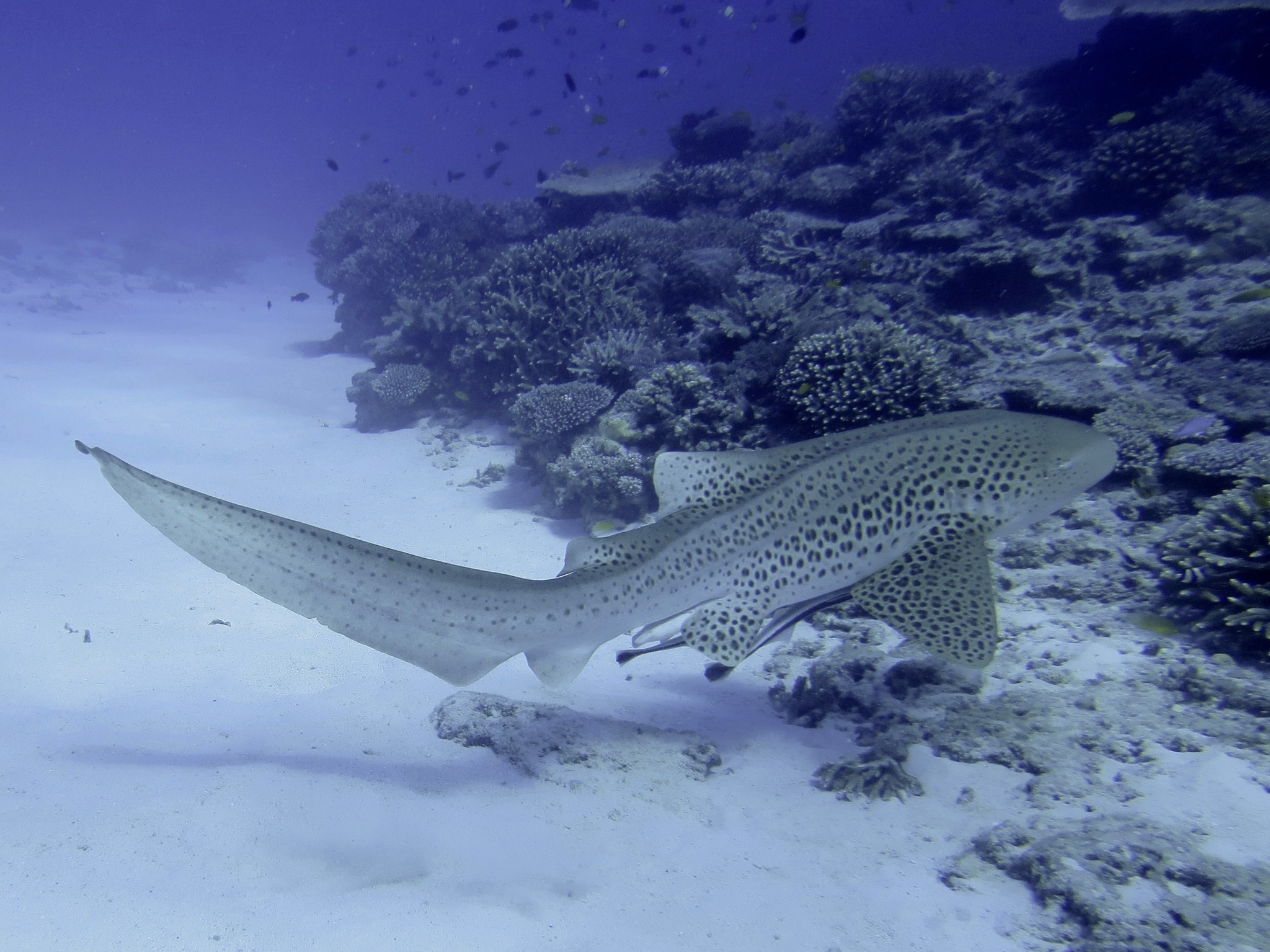
- Stegostoma tigrinum

Scientific classification
- Kingdom: Animalia
- Phylum: Chordata
- Class: Chondrichthyes
- Subclass: Elasmobranchii
- Division: Selachii
- Order: Orectolobiformes
- Family: Stegostomatidae; T. N. Gill, 1862
- Genus: Stegostoma; J. P. Müller & Henle, 1837

Type species
- Squalus varius Seba, 1759

= Stegostoma =

Stegostoma Temporal range: Middle Eocene-recent, 40–0 Ma

Genus of sharks

Stegostoma is a genus of sharks, the sole member of the family, Stegostomatidae, that includes one living species, the zebra shark (Stegostoma tigrinum). It contains one described extinct species, S. tethysiensis.
