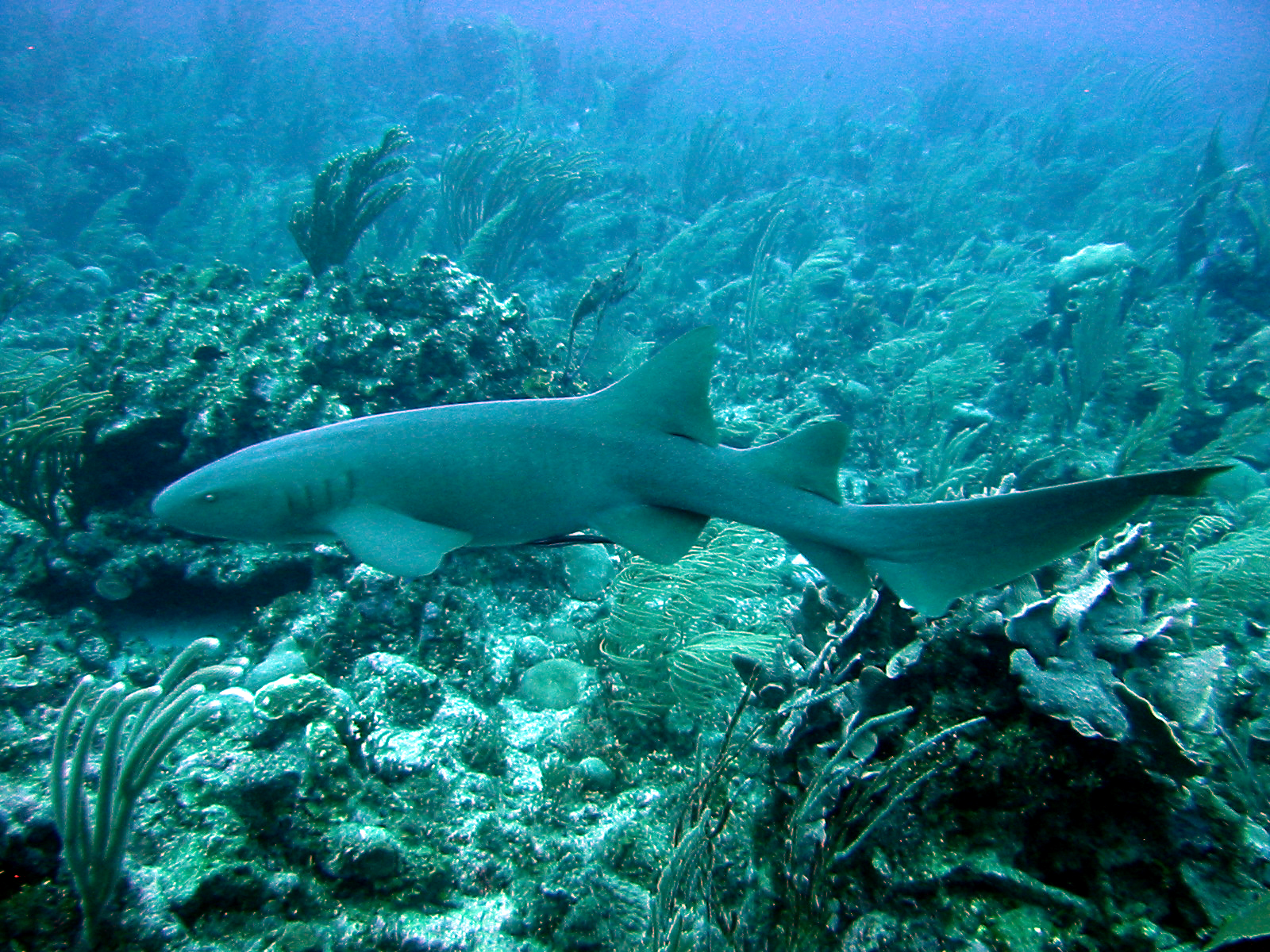
- Ginglymostoma cirratum

Scientific classification
- Kingdom: Animalia
- Phylum: Chordata
- Class: Chondrichthyes
- Subclass: Elasmobranchii
- Division: Selachii
- Order: Orectolobiformes
- Family: Ginglymostomatidae
- Genus: Ginglymostoma; J. P. Müller & Henle, 1837
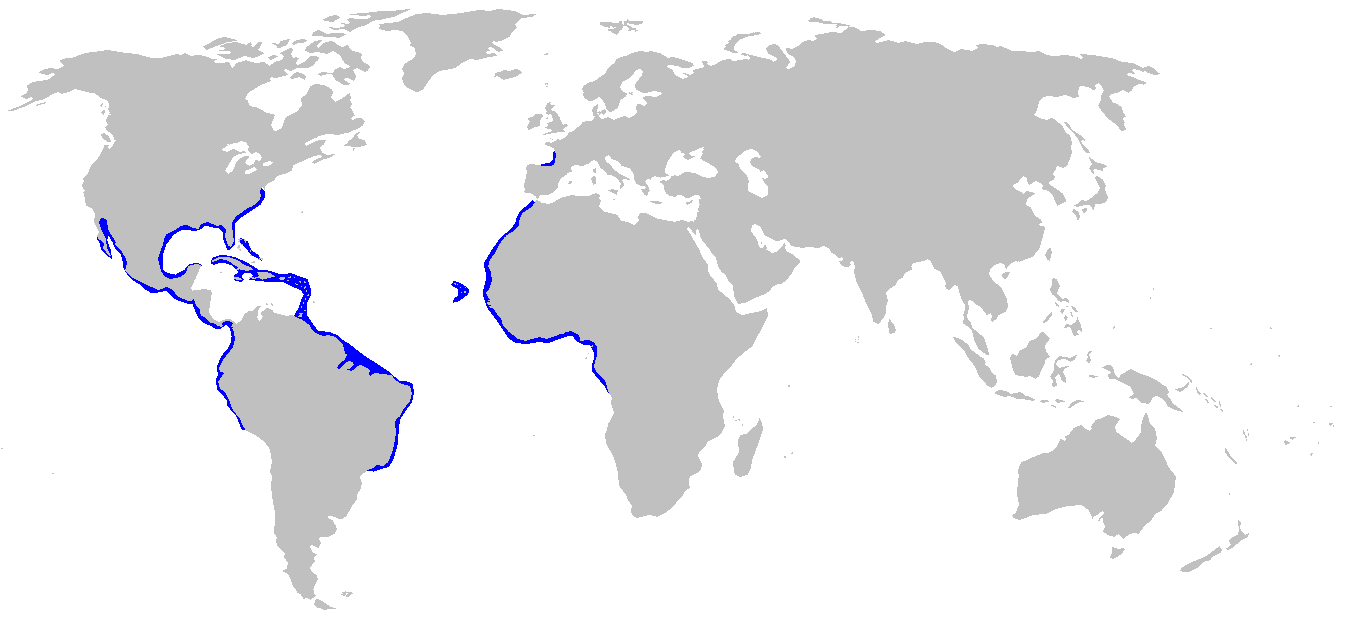
- Range of the two extant species

= Ginglymostoma =

Ginglymostoma Temporal range: 112–0 Ma Albian to Present

Genus of sharks

Ginglymostoma (from the Ancient Greek words γίγγλυμος (gínglumos), meaning "hinge", and στόμα (stóma), meaning "mouth") is a genus of shark in the family Ginglymostomatidae. There are two members in the genus. Members of this genus eat small fish and crustaceans, and are commonly quite lethargic unless provoked. Members of this genus have the ability to suck in water in order to remove snails from their shells in a manner that can be described as 'vacuum-like'.

== Distribution ==
This shark lives in Brazil, the United States, Colombia, Ecuador, Cape Verde, Morocco, Mauritania, Senegal, the Gambia, Guinea-Bissau, Guinea, Sierra Leone, Liberia, Ivory Coast, Ghana, Togo, Benin, Nigeria, Cameroon, Equatorial Guinea, Republic of the Congo, Angola, the Democratic Republic of the Congo, Gabon, France, Spain, Nicaragua, Saint Lucia, Guatemala, Saint Vincent and the Grenadines, Guyana, Grenada, Suriname, French Guiana, Trinidad and Tobago, Dominica, Martinique, Dominican Republic, Costa Rica, Honduras, Haiti, Jamaica, Puerto Rico, El Salvador, Saint Kitts and Nevis, Turks and Caicos Islands, Guadeloupe, Montserrat, Antigua and Barbuda, Belize, Anguilla, Virgin Islands, Venezuela, Saint Martin, Sint Eustatius, Bonaire, Barbados, Bermuda, Aruba, Mexico, Cayman Islands, and Peru.

== Species ==
There are currently two recognized extant species in this genus, and numerous extinct species:

- Ginglymostoma cirratum Bonnaterre, 1788 (nurse shark)
- Ginglymostoma unami Del-Moral-Flores, Ramírez-Antonio, Angulo & Pérez-Ponce de León, 2015 (Pacific nurse shark)

=== Fossil record ===
- †Ginglymostoma angolense (Dartevelle & Casier, 1943)
- †Ginglymostoma botmaense Noubhani & Cappetta, 1997
- †Ginglymostoma chenanei Noubhani & Cappetta, 1997
- †Ginglymostoma cuspidata Case, Borodin & Leggett, 2001
- †Ginglymostoma dartevellei Casier, 1946
- †Ginglymostoma delfortriei Daimeries, 1889
- †Ginglymostoma erramii Noubhani & Cappetta, 1997
- †Ginglymostoma khouribgaense Noubhani & Cappetta, 1997
- †Ginglymostoma maghrebianum Casier, 1947
- †Ginglymostoma malembeense Dartevelle & Casier, 1943
- †Ginglymostoma maroccanum Noubhani & Cappetta, 1997
- †Ginglymostoma serra Leidy, 1877
- †Ginglymostoma sokotoense White, 1934
- †Ginglymostoma subafricanum Arambourg, 1952
