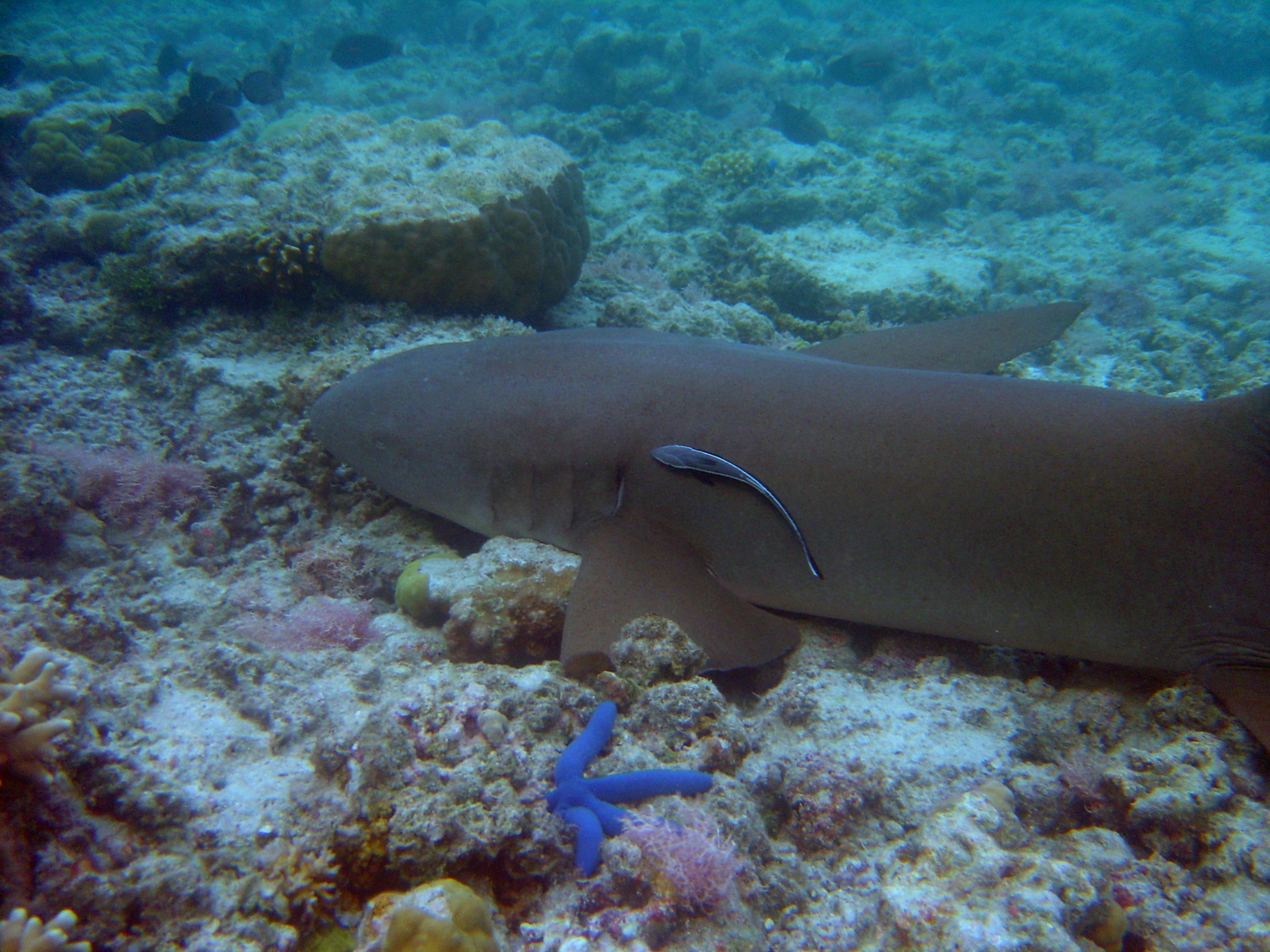
- Tawny nurse shark, Nebrius ferrugineus

Scientific classification
- Kingdom: Animalia
- Phylum: Chordata
- Class: Chondrichthyes
- Subclass: Elasmobranchii
- Division: Selachii
- Order: Orectolobiformes
- Family: Ginglymostomatidae
- Genus: Nebrius; Rüppell, 1837

Species
- Nebrius ferrugineus Lesson, 1831; † Nebrius bequaerti (Leriche, 1920); † Nebrius blanckenhorni (Stromer, 1905); † Nebrius obliquus (Leidy, 1877); † Nebrius thielensis (Winkler 1873)

Synonyms
- Nebrodes Garman, 1913

= Nebrius =

Nebrius Temporal range: 65–0 Ma Danian to Present

Genus of sharks

Nebrius is a genus of carpet sharks in the family Ginglymostomatidae.

It contains a single extant species, the tawny nurse shark (Nebrius ferrugineus), as well as a number of extinct species dating back to the Early Paleocene.

== See also ==
- Prehistoric sharks
- List of prehistoric cartilaginous fish
