= Nurse shark =

Nurse shark Temporal range: 112–0 Ma Albian to Present
- In Brazil

Conservation status
- Vulnerable (IUCN 3.1)

Scientific classification
- Kingdom: Animalia
- Phylum: Chordata
- Class: Chondrichthyes
- Subclass: Elasmobranchii
- Division: Selachii
- Order: Orectolobiformes
- Family: Ginglymostomatidae
- Genus: Ginglymostoma
- Species: G. cirratum

Binomial name
- Ginglymostoma cirratum (Bonnaterre, 1788)

Elasmobranch fish in the family Ginglymostomatidae

The nurse shark (Ginglymostoma cirratum) is an elasmobranch fish in the family Ginglymostomatidae. The conservation status of the nurse shark is globally assessed as vulnerable in the IUCN List of Threatened Species. They are considered to be a species of least concern in the United States and in The Bahamas, but considered to be near threatened in the western Atlantic Ocean because of their vulnerable status in South America and reported threats throughout many areas of Central America and the Caribbean. They are directly targeted in some fisheries and considered by-catch in others.

Nurse sharks are an important species for shark research. They are robust and able to tolerate capture, handling, and tagging extremely well.

== Taxonomy and etymology ==
The nurse shark genus Ginglymostoma is derived from Greek language meaning hinged mouth, whereas the species cirratum is derived from Latin meaning having curled ringlets. Based on morphological similarities, Ginglymostoma is believed to be the sister genus of Nebrius, with both being placed in a clade that also include species Pseudoginglymostoma brevicaudatum, Rhincodon typus, and Stegostoma fasciatum.

The name "nurse" may have originated from antiquated spelling conventions. The Oxford English Dictionary notes that in medieval times, the "n" of the word "an" was frequently transferred to a following word that began with a vowel. Huss, husse, and hurse were antiquated names for dogfish and other sharks.

Another possibility is noted by Lineaweaver and Backus in The Natural History of Sharks, which posits instead that the name comes from the fact that the nurse shark is ovoviviparous.

"Possibly, some bygone observer watched a shark giving birth to live young and thought the shark was giving nurse."

== Distribution and habitat ==
The nurse shark has a wide but patchy geographical distribution along tropical and subtropical coastal waters of the Eastern Atlantic, Western Atlantic, and Eastern Pacific. In the Eastern Atlantic, it ranges from Cape Verde to Gabon (accidental north to France). In the Western Atlantic, including the Caribbean, it ranges from Rhode Island to southern Brazil, and in the Eastern Pacific from Baja California to Peru.

In the Caribbean

Nurse sharks are a typically inshore, bottom-dwelling species. Juveniles are mostly found on the bottom of shallow coral reefs, seagrass flats, and around mangrove islands, whereas older individuals typically reside in and around deeper reefs and rocky areas, where they tend to seek shelter in crevices and under ledges during the day and leave their shelter at night to feed on the seabed in shallower areas.

== Description ==
The nurse shark has two rounded dorsal fins, rounded pectoral fins, an elongated caudal fin, and a broad head. Maximum adult length is currently documented as 3.08 m (10 ft 1 1/2 in), whereas past reports of 4.5 m (15 ft) and corresponding weights of up to 330 kg (730 lb) are likely to have been exaggerated. Adult nurse sharks are brownish in color. Newborn nurse sharks have a spotted coloration, which fades with age, and are about 30 cm in length when nascent.

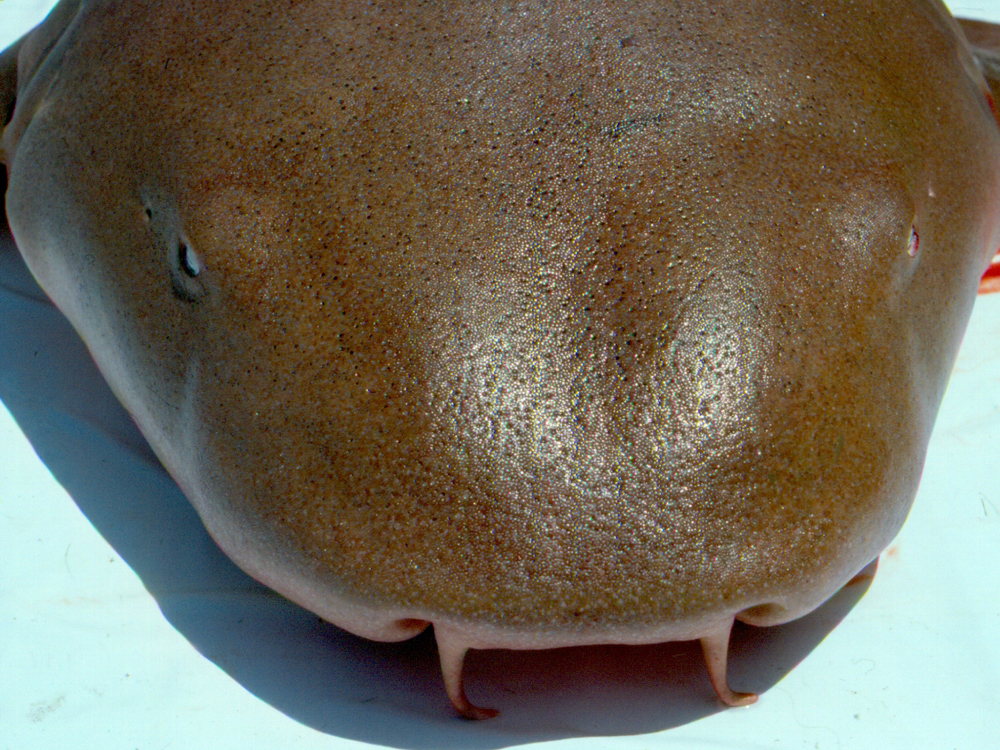
Head

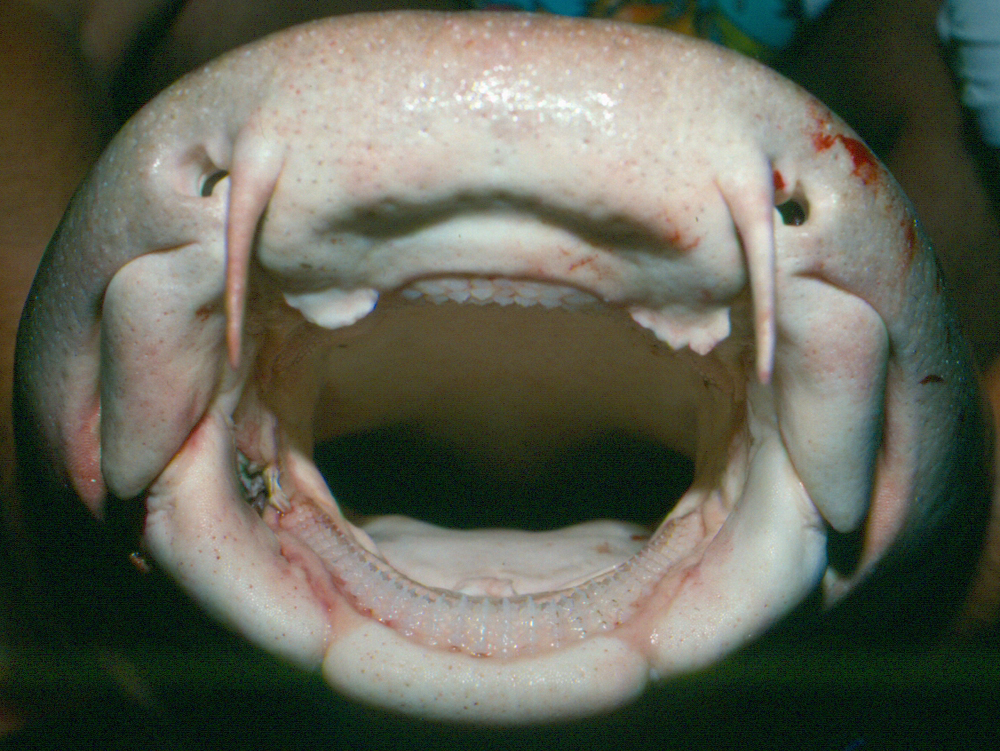
Mouth

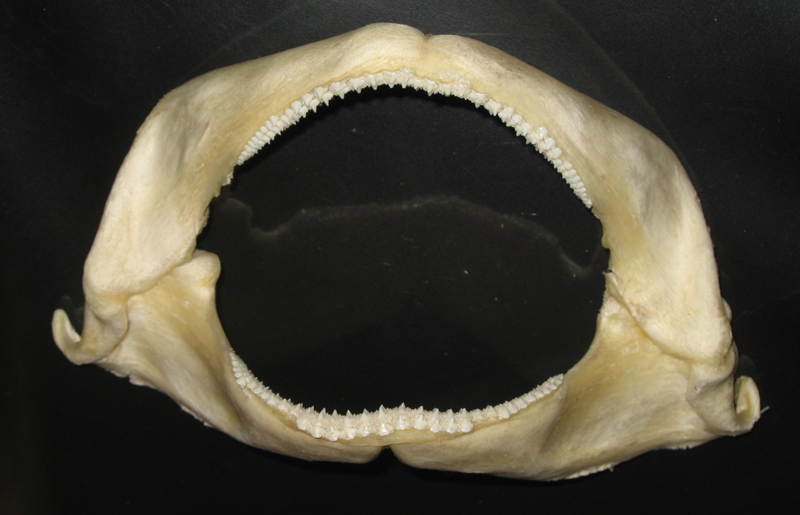
Jaws

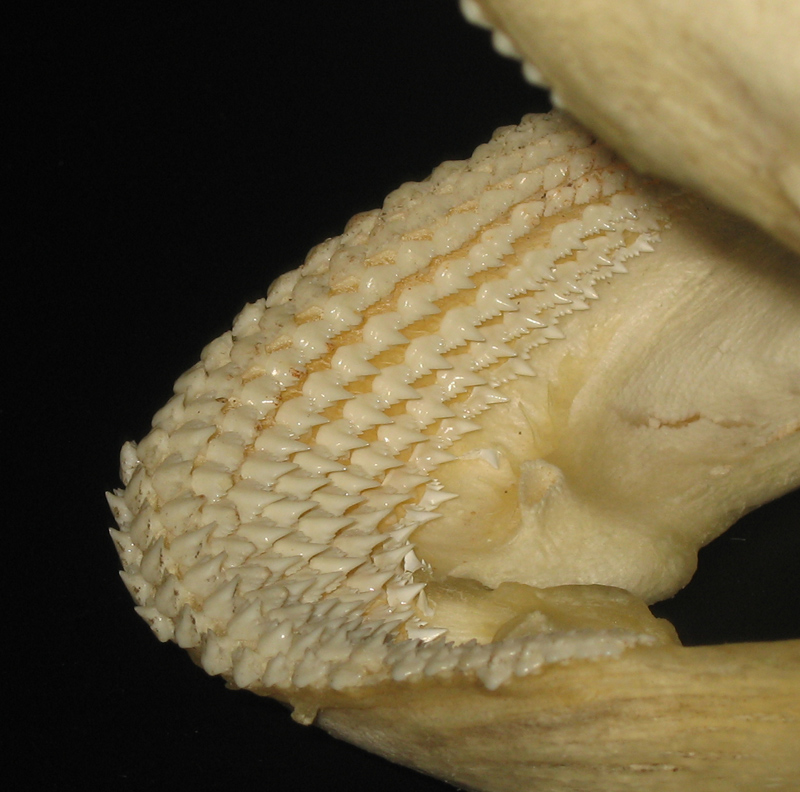
Teeth

== Biology and ecology ==
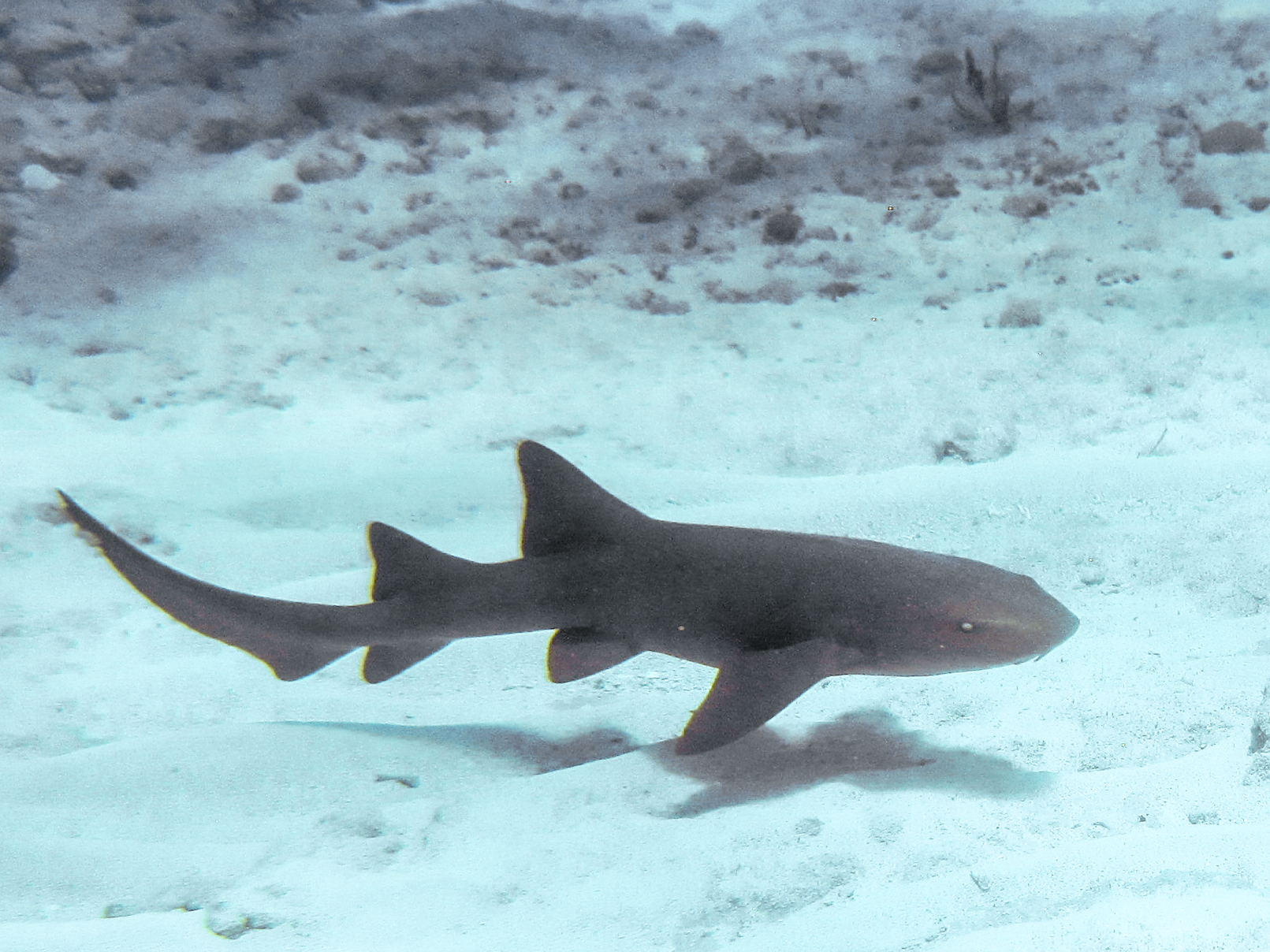
In Florida

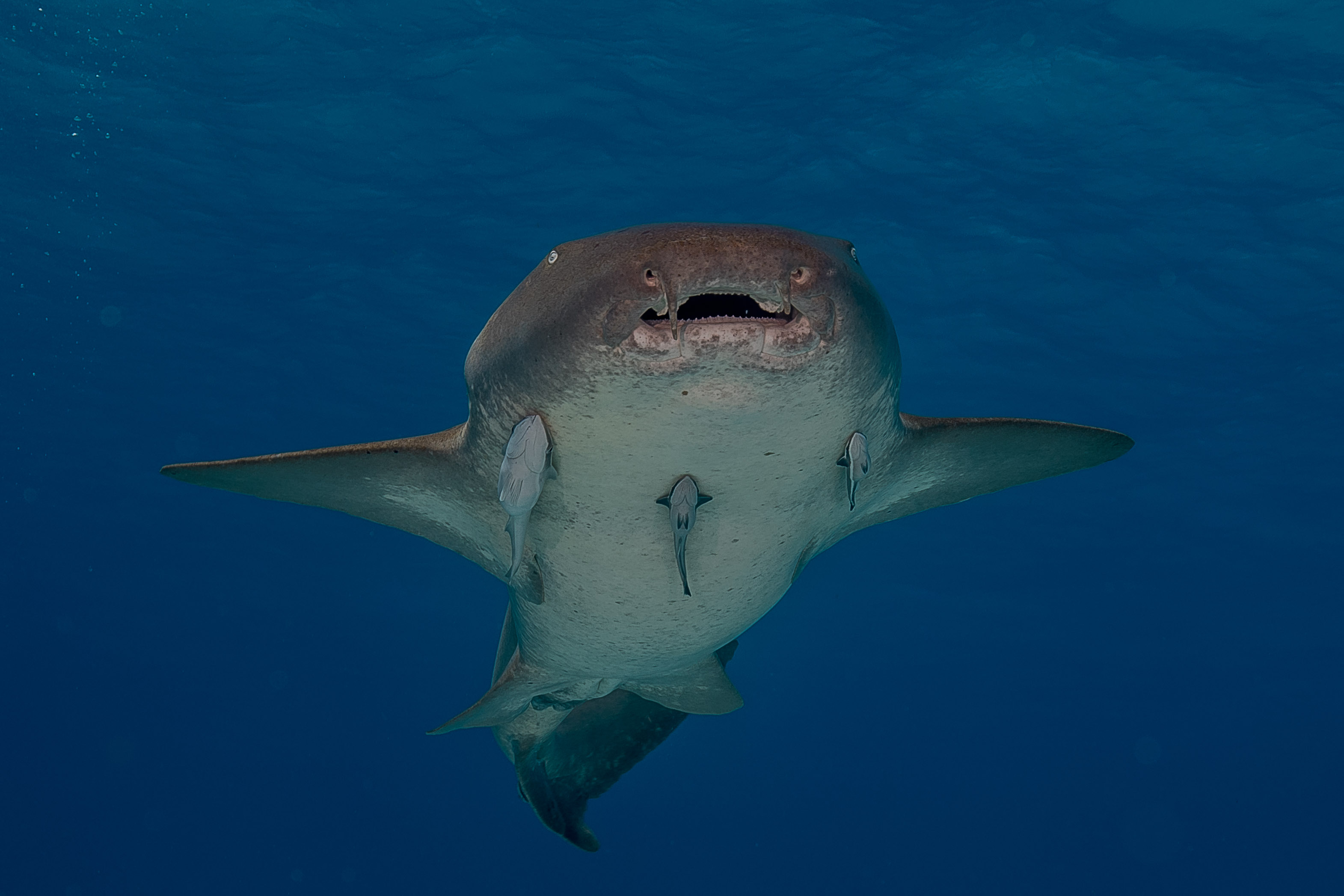
Nurse shark swimming

Nurse sharks are opportunistic predators that feed primarily on small fish (e.g. stingrays, teleosts) and some invertebrates (e.g. crustaceans, molluscs, sea urchins, tunicates, and anthozoans), as well as algae. They are typically solitary nocturnal animals, rifling through bottom sediments in search of food at night, but are often gregarious during the day forming large sedentary groups. Nurse sharks are obligate suction feeders capable of generating suction forces that are among the highest recorded for any aquatic vertebrate to date. Although their small mouths may limit the size of prey, they can exhibit a suck-and-spit behavior and/or shake their head violently to reduce the size of food items.

Nurse sharks are exceptionally sedentary, unlike most other shark species. Nurse sharks show strong site fidelity (typical of reef sharks) and are one of the few shark species known to exhibit mating-site fidelity, as they will return to the same breeding grounds time and time again.

American alligators (Alligator mississippiensis) and American crocodiles (Crocodylus acutus) may occasionally prey on nurse sharks in some coastal habitats. Photographic evidence and historical accounts suggest that encounters between species are commonplace in their shared habitats.

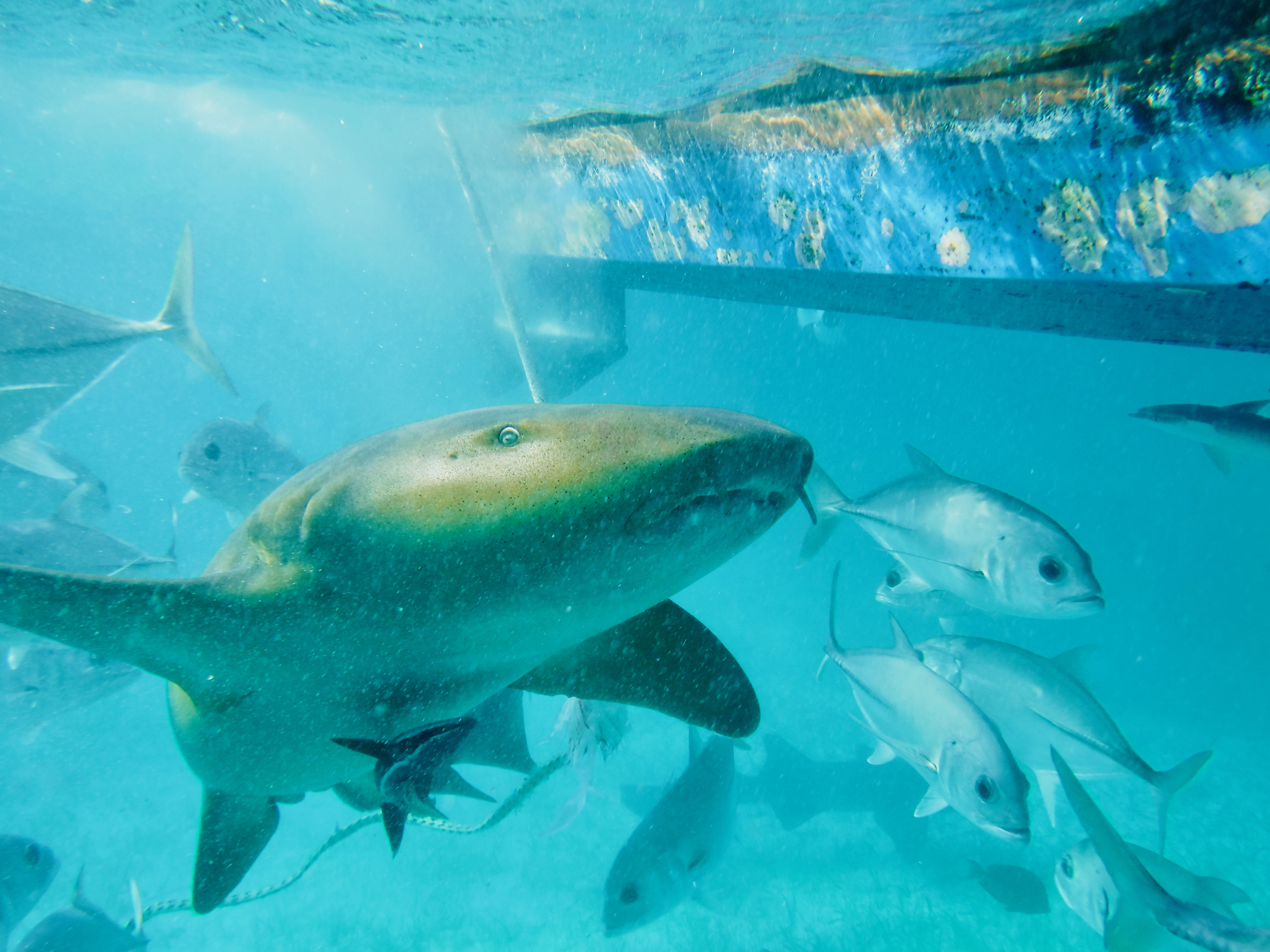
Nurse shark swims near boat

Nurse sharks are also subject to piebaldism, a genetic condition that results in a partial lack of body pigmentation and a speckled body.

== Reproduction ==
Nurse sharks are ovoviviparous, with fertilized eggs hatching inside the female. The mating cycle of nurse sharks is biennial, with females taking up to 18 months to produce a new batch of eggs. The mating season runs from late June to the end of July, with a gestation period of six months and a typical litter of 21–29 pups. The young are born fully developed at about 30 cm long.

Nurse sharks engage in multiple paternity during mating season. A study conducted over a 10-year span found that a brood of nurse sharks had more genotypes than broods with one father. Fourteen separate genotypes were found in the brood examined, which suggests that more than one father fertilized the mother's eggs. Engagement in multiple paternity promotes genetic variation.

== See also ==
- List of sharks
- List of prehistoric cartilaginous fish
- Great white shark
