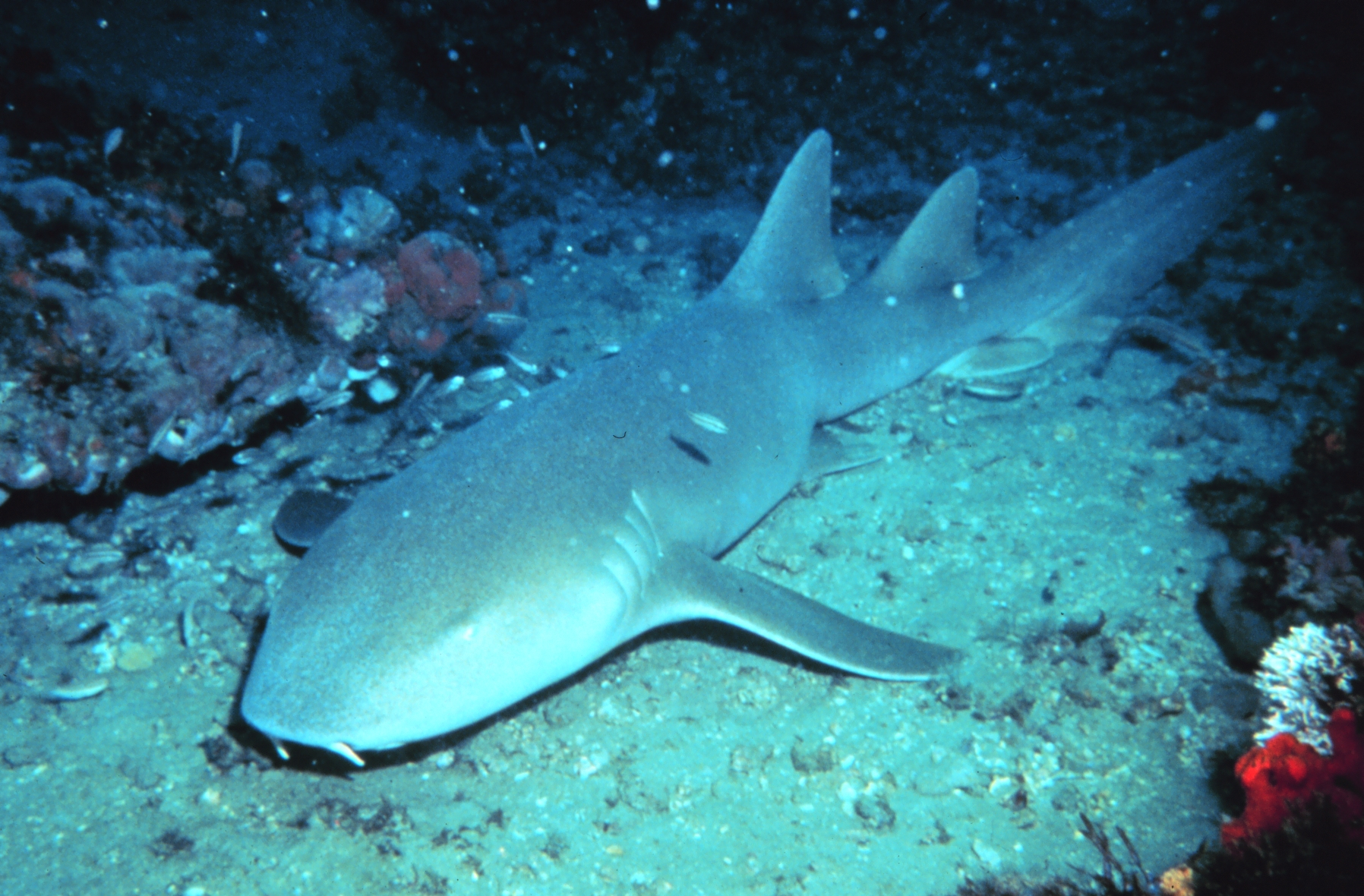
- Ginglymostoma cirratum

Scientific classification
- Kingdom: Animalia
- Phylum: Chordata
- Class: Chondrichthyes
- Subclass: Elasmobranchii
- Division: Selachii
- Order: Orectolobiformes
- Family: Ginglymostomatidae; T. N. Gill, 1862

Genera
- Ginglymostoma; Nebrius; Pseudoginglymostoma

= Ginglymostomatidae =

Ginglymostomatidae Temporal range: Upper Jurassic–recent

Family of sharks

The Ginglymostomatidae are a cosmopolitan family of carpet sharks known as nurse sharks, containing four species in three genera. Common in shallow, tropical, and subtropical waters, these sharks are sluggish and docile bottom dwellers. They are the most abundant species of shark found in shallow coastal waters. Nurse sharks typically attack humans only if directly threatened.

The name nurse shark is thought to be a corruption of nusse, a name which once referred to the catsharks of the family Scyliorhinidae. The nurse shark family name, Ginglymostomatidae, derives from the Ancient Greek words γίγγλυμος (gínglumos), meaning "hinge", and στόμα (stóma), meaning "mouth".

== Description ==
The largest species, called simply the nurse shark Ginglymostoma cirratum, may reach a length of 4.3 m (14 ft); the tawny nurse shark Nebrius ferrugineus is somewhat smaller at 3.2 m (10 ft), and the short-tail nurse shark Pseudoginglymostoma brevicaudatum is by far the smallest at just 75 cm (2.46 ft) in length. The first of the three species may reach a weight of 110 kg. Yellowish to dark brown in colour, nurse sharks have muscular pectoral fins, two spineless dorsal fins (the second of which is smaller) in line with the pelvic and anal fins, and a tail exceeding one quarter the shark's body length.

The mouth of nurse sharks is most distinctive; it is far ahead of the eyes and before the snout (subterminal), an indication of the bottom-dwelling (benthic) nature of these sharks. Also present on the lower jaw are two fleshy barbels, chemosensory organs that help the nurse sharks find prey hidden in the sediments. Behind each eye is a very small, circular opening called a spiracle, part of the shark's respiratory system. The serrated teeth are fan-shaped and independent; like other sharks, the teeth are continually replaced throughout the animal's life.

== Habits ==
Nurse sharks are nocturnal animals, spending the day in large inactive groups of up to 40 individuals. Hidden under submerged ledges or in crevices within the reef, the nurse sharks seem to prefer specific haunts and return to them every day. By night, the sharks are largely solitary; they spend most of their time searching through the bottom sediments in search of food. Their diet consists primarily of crustaceans, molluscs, tunicates, and other fish, particularly stingrays.

Nurse sharks are thought to take advantage of dormant fish, which would otherwise be too fast for the sharks to catch; although their small mouths limit the size of prey items, the sharks' large throat cavities are used as a sort of bellows valve. In this way, nurse sharks are able to suck in their prey. Nurse sharks are also known to graze algae and coral.

== Reproduction ==
The mating season runs from late June to the end of July. All nurse sharks are aplacental viviparous, meaning the eggs develop and hatch within the body of the female, where the hatchlings develop further until live birth occurs. The gestation period is six months, with a typical litter of 30–40 pups. The mating cycle is biennial, as 18 months are needed for the female's ovaries to produce another batch of eggs. The young nurse sharks are born fully developed at about 30 cm (12 in) long in Ginglymostoma cirratum. They possess a spotted coloration that fades with age.

== Genera and species ==
- Genus Ginglymostoma J. P. Müller & Henle, 1837
  - Ginglymostoma cirratum Bonnaterre, 1788 (nurse shark)
  - Ginglymostoma unami Del-Moral-Flores, Ramírez-Antonio, Angulo & Pérez-Ponce de León, 2015
- Genus Nebrius Rüppell, 1837
  - Nebrius ferrugineus Lesson, 1831 (tawny nurse shark)
- Genus Pseudoginglymostoma Dingerkus, 1986
  - Pseudoginglymostoma brevicaudatum Günther, 1867 (short-tail nurse shark)

== See also ==
- List of sharks
