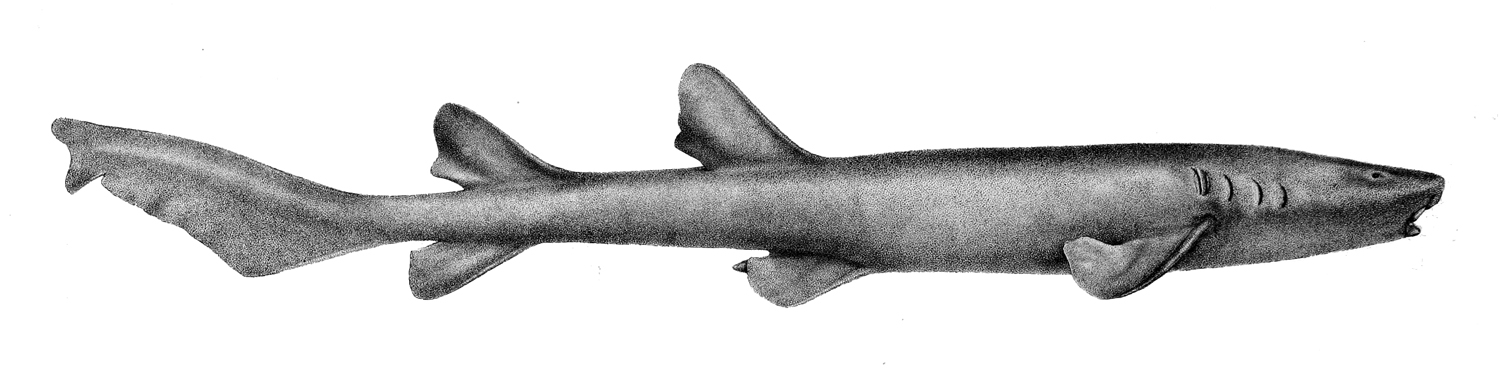

Conservation status
- Critically Endangered (IUCN 3.1)

Scientific classification
- Kingdom: Animalia
- Phylum: Chordata
- Class: Chondrichthyes
- Subclass: Elasmobranchii
- Division: Selachii
- Order: Orectolobiformes
- Family: Ginglymostomatidae
- Genus: Pseudoginglymostoma; Dingerkus, 1986
- Species: P. brevicaudatum

Binomial name
- Pseudoginglymostoma brevicaudatum (Günther, 1867)
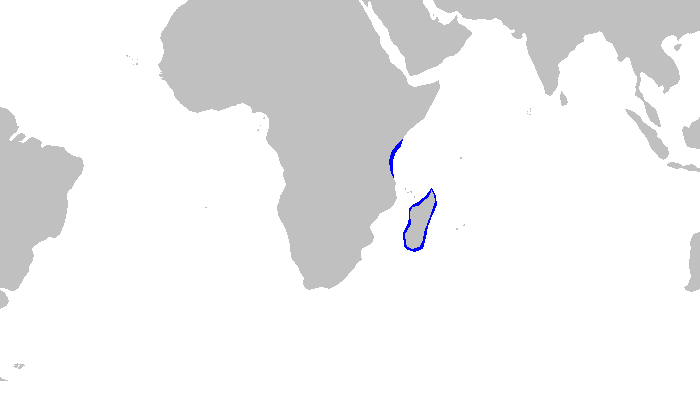
- Range of short-tail nurse shark (in blue)

= Short-tail nurse shark =

Species of shark

The short-tail nurse shark (Pseudoginglymostoma brevicaudatum) is an orectolobiform shark in the family Ginglymostomatidae, the only member of the genus Pseudoginglymostoma. It is found in the tropical western Indian Ocean between latitudes 0° and 27° S, and has a maximum recorded length of 75 cm.

== Distribution ==
In Kenya

The short-tail nurse shark has been documented in the western Indian Ocean off of Tanzania, Kenya, Madagascar and in Mozambique. There have also been unconfirmed sightings in the Seychelles and Mauritius.

In 2020, a short-tail nurse shark was caught on camera in South Africa by Forrest Galante and associates in search of the whitetip weasel shark.

== Feeding ==
The natural diet of P. brevicaudatum is unknown.

In 2024, the Clearwater Marine Aquarium, which at the time housed two short-tail nurse sharks, conducted a trial period recording on a scale of 0-5 the sharks’ preference in foods based on what food the sharks gravitated towards. The aquarium created a varied diet based on nurse shark husbandry consisting of shrimp, clams, krill, mussels and silverside. It was discovered that the sharks had a high consumption preference for krill with an average rating of 3.5, while interest varied between shrimp and clams throughout the trial period. P. brevicaudatum had the highest preference for mussels with an average rating of 4. The sharks would carry mussels in their mouths, and crack the shells and place them under rocks, but none of the meat was eaten.

== Reproduction ==
The short-tail nurse shark has been observed to lay eggs in captivity. This is unlike other species of ginglymostomatids, which are ovoviviparous.

== See also ==
- List of sharks
