= Paleobiota of the Tamiami Formation =

List of organisms from the Tamiami Formation and related units

The diversity of the Acline Fauna showcased on this Hyotissa, where there are at least 7 species present.

The Tamiami Formation is a Konzentrat Lagerstätte in Florida that preserves an unusually high diversity of species. A variety of distinct terrestrial, marine and freshwater ecosystems are represented by the formation, including rivers, lakes, reefs, swamps, beaches, and seagrass beds. Fossils are mostly known from canals, roads (being named after US Highway 41), dredging, and shell pits. There are few natural exposures of the formation, like Cookiecutter Creek and Venice Beach.

The geology of the Tamiami Formation is complex and debated. This list includes fossils from the Bayshore and Murdock Station units, as these are both currently referred to as members of the Tamiami, and as formations in the Hawthorn Group.

== Algae ==
Haptophytes are preserved as mineral shells and are used in biochronology.

Family	Genus	Species	Member	Abundance	Notes	Image
†Discoasteraceae	†Discoaster	†Discoaster pentardiatus	Pinecrest beds	Common		
Noelaerhabdaceae	Gephyrocapsa	Gephyrocapsa caribbeannica	Pinecrest beds		Individuals in the Tamiami formation are larger than modern individuals	
Noelaerhabdaceae	Reticulofenestra	Reticulofenestra pseudoumbilica	Pinecrest beds	Common		
†Sphenolithaceae	†Sphenolithus	†Sphenolithus abies		Extremely Common		

== Amphibians ==
Family	Genus	Species	Member	Abundance	Notes	Images
Ranidae	Rana	Rana cf. catesbiana			Large Frog	
Sirenidae	Siren	Siren cf. lacertina			Greater Siren	

== Annelids ==
Family	Genus	Species	Member	Abundance	Notes	Image
Spionidae	Helicotaphrichnus	Helicotaphrichnus commensalis	Pinecrest Beds		Exclusively associated with hermit crabs	Helicotaphrichnus commensalis boring (bottom center) on a Strombus floridanus, upper Pinecrest Beds of Hillsborough County
Spionidae	Polydora					Mercenaria campechiensis with Polydora borings from the Fruitville Member of the Tamiami Formation of Manatee County

== Bacillariophyta (Diatoms) ==
Family	Genus	Species	Member	Abundance	Notes	Image
Cocconeidaceae	Cocconeis	Multiple				
Diploneidaceae	Diploneis	Diploneis exemta			Validity Unclear	
Fragilariaceae	Opephora	Multiple				
Fragilariaceae	Synedra	Multiple				Synedra sp. from the Tamiami Formation of Hillsborough County
Heliopeltaceae	Actinoptychus	Actinoptychus bismarckii			Unassessed	
Naviculaceae	Navicula	Navicula optima			Unassessed	
Unknown	Acanthes	Multiple			Misspelling?	

== Bony fishes ==
Family	Genus	Species	Member	Abundance	Notes	Image
Diodontidae	Indeterminate					
Ictaluridae	Indeterminate					
Lepisosteidae	Atractosteus					
Lepisosteidae	Indeterminate					
Mugilidae	Mugil	Mugil sp.	Pinecrest Beds		Mullet	
Sparidae	Archosargus					
Sparidae	Lagodon					
Sphyraenidae	Sphyraena	Sphyraena barracuda				A barracuda tooth from the Tamiami or Peace River Formation
Sciaenidae	Pogonias	Pogonias cromis				

== Brachiopoda ==
Family	Genus	Species	Member	Abundance	Notes	Image
Lingulidae	Glottidia	†Glottidia inexpectens	Lower	Rare	Also occurs in the Bone Valley Formation	

== Bryozoa ==
Family	Genus	Species	Member	Abundance	Notes	Image
Adeonidae	Reptadeonella	†Reptadeonella umbilicata				
Calloporidae	Amphiblestrum	†Amphiblestrum constrictum				
Calloporidae	Aplousina	†Aplousina grandis				
Calloporidae	Copidozoum	†Copidozoum cf. parvirostris				
Celleporidae	Pourtalesella	†Pourtalesella chiarae				
Cribrilinidae	Cribrilaria	Cribrilaria scripta				
Bitectiporidae	Metroperiella	†Metroperiella reversa				
Bryocryptellidae	Cyclocolposa	†Cyclocolposa perforata				
Lepraliellidae	Celleporaria					
Microporellidae	Microporella	Microporella cf. pontifica	Pinecrest Beds			
Microporellidae	Microporella	†Microporella sarasotaensis	Pinecrest Beds	Common		
Microporellidae	Microporella	†Microporella stellata	Lower			
Microporellidae	Microporella	†Microporella tamiamiensis	Pinecrest Beds			
Oncousoeciidae	Oncousoecia					
Onychocellidae	Floridina	†Floridina regularis				
Phidoloporidae	Plesiocleidochasma	†Plesiocleidochasma cf. vestitum				
Romancheinidae	Hippopleurifera	Hippopleurifera mucronata				
Schizoporellidae	Stylopoma	†Stylopoma leverhulme				
Stomachetosellidae	†Cycloperiella	†Cycloperiella rubra				
Trypostegidae	Trypostega	†Trypostega composita				

== Corals ==
Coral deposits are found within all members of the Tamiami formation. The Golden Gate Reef Member has over a hundred species of coral alone.

Family	Genus	Species	Member	Abundance	Notes	Image
Acroporidae	Acropora	Acropora cf. panamensis	Golden Gates			
Acroporidae	Acropora		Golden Gates			
Caryophylliidae	†Placocyathus	†Placocyathus barretti			Not a synonym of Trochocyathus	
Caryophylliidae	†Placocyathus	†Placocyathus variabilis			Not a synonym of Trochocyathus	
Faviidae	†Antillia	†Antillia walli	Golden Gates			
Faviidae	†Antillophyllia	†Antillophyllia dominicensis				
Faviidae	†Antillophyllia	†Antillophyllia dubia				
Faviidae	Isophyllia	Isophyllia sinuosa				Isophyllia sinuosa from the Okeechobee Group (Tamiami Formation?)
Faviidae	Manicina	Manicina areolata				
Faviidae	Scolymia	Scolymia cubensis				
Faviidae	Scolymia	Scolymia lacera				
Faviidae	Scolymia	†Scolymia meederi	Golden Gates			
Faviidae	Scolymia	†Scolymia tamiamiensis				
Meandrinidae	Dichocoenia	†Dichocoenia cf. eminens				
Meandrinidae	Dichocoenia	†Dichocoenia sp.				
Meandrinidae	Dichocoenia	†Dichocoenia tuberosa				
Meandrinidae	Dichocoenia	Dichocoenia stokesi	Golden Gates			
Meandrinidae	Meandrina	Meandrina meandrites				
Merulinidae	Orbicella	†Orbicella limbata				
Merulinidae	Trachyphyllia	†Trachyphyllia bilobata				
Merulinidae	Trachyphyllia	Trachyphyllia geoffroyi			Locally extinct	
Montastraeidae	Montastrea	†Montastrea brevis				
Montastraeidae	Montastrea	†Montastrea endothecata				
Mussidae(?)	Solenastrea	Solenastrea bournoni	Pinecrest Beds, Golden Gates			Solenastrea
Mussidae(?)	Solenastrea	Solenastrea hyades				
Pocilloporidae	Stylophora	†Stylophora affinis	Golden Gates Reef			
Pocilloporidae	Stylophora	†Stylophora granulata	Golden Gates Reef			
Pocilloporidae	Stylophora	†Stylophora minor	Golden Gates Reef			
Poritidae	Goniopora	†Goniopora hilli				
Poritidae	Porites	†Porites baracoaensis	Golden Gates Reef			
Rhizangiidae	Septastrea	†Septastrea crassa				
Rhizangiidae	Septastrea	†Septastrea marylandica	Pinecrest Beds		Associated with hermit crabs	Septastrea marylandica from the Caloosahatchee Formation of Hillsborough County
Rhizangiidae	Septastrea	†Septastrea matsoni				Septastrea matsoni on a Strombus floridanus, Pinecrest Beds of Hillsborough County
Siderastreidae	Siderastrea	†Siderastrea dalli	Golden Gates Reef			
Siderastreidae	Siderastrea	†Siderastrea pliocenica				

== Chondrichthyes ==
=== Rays ===
Family	Genus	Species	Member	Abundance	Notes	Image
Aetobatidae	Aetobatus	Aetobatus sp.				Aetobatus sp. dental plate fragment from the Pinecrest Beds of Sarasota County
Mobulidae	Mobula	Mobula birostris				
Mobulidae	Mobula	Mobula hypostoma				
Myliobatidae	Myliobatis	Myliobatis sp.	Pinecrest Beds			Myliobatis sp. dental plate from the Pinecrest Beds of Sarasota county

=== Sharks ===
The Tamiami Formation is partially the source of the shark teeth of Venice Beach.

Family	Genus	Species	Member	Abundance	Notes	Image
Carcharhinidae	Carcharhinus	Carcharhinus leucas				Carcharhinus leucas from the Tamiami Formation of Sarasota
Carcharhinidae	Negaprion	Negaprion brevirostris	Lower, Pinecrest Beds			Negaprion brevirostris from the Pinecrest Beds of Hillsborough County
Carcharhinidae	Galeocerdo	Galeocerdo cuvier				
Carcharhinidae	†Physogaleus	†Physogaleus contortus		Uncommon		Physogaleus contortus from the Bone Valley Formation’s Palmetto Fauna, a contemporary deposit to the Lower Tamiami Formation
Dalatiidae	Isistius	†Isistius triangulus		Common (186 teeth)	Extinct cookiecutter shark	
Hemigaleidae	Hemipristis	†Hemipristis serra				Hemipristis serra from the Bone Valley Formation’s Palmetto Fauna, a contemporary deposit to the Lower Tamiami Formation
Incertae sedis	†Parotodus	†Parotodus benedinii				Parotodus benedinii from the Peace River Formation or potentially the lower units of the overlying Tamiami Formation
Lamnidae	Carcharodon	Carcharodon carcharias				
Lamnidae	Carcharodon	†Carcharodon hastalis				Carcharodon hastalis from the Bone Valley Formation’s Palmetto Fauna, a contemporary deposit to the lower Tamiami Formation. (s.l.)
Lamnidae	Isurus	Isurus oxyrinchus		Uncommon		
†Otodontidae	†Otodus	†Otodus megalodon		Uncommon		Otodus megalodon from the Tamiami or Peace River Formation of Sarasota
Scyliohinidae	Scyliorhinus	Scyliorhinus sp.				
Squatinidae	Squatina					

== Crustacea ==
=== Cirripedia ===
Family	Genus	Species	Member	Abundance	Notes	Image
Balanidae	Chesaconcavus	†Chesaconcavus tamiamiensis	Murdock Station (Note: As of 2021 the Murdock Station Unit is regarded as a separate formation by Petuch. As of 2026, the Murdock Station Unit is still regarded as a member of the Tamiami, and other authors have abandoned it entirely. The unit is included here as Tamiami Formation sensu latissimo.)	Index for Murdock Unit		
Balanidae	Paraconcavus	†Paraconcavus sarasotaensis	Pinecrest Beds?			
Balanidae	Paraconcavus	†Paraconcavus talquinensis				
Balanidae	Tamiosoma	†Tamiosoma advena		Validity unclear		

=== Decapoda ===
Family	Genus	Species	Member	Abundance	Notes	Image
Calappidae	Calappa	Calappa sp.				Calappa sp. from the Pinecrest Beds of Sarasota County
Callianassidae	Callianassa				Mud shrimp	
Callichiridae	Glypturus	Glypturus acanthochirus	Pinecrest Beds		Ghost shrimp	Glypturus acanthochirus fragment from the Pinecrest Beds of Hillsborough County, <2 mm
Cryptochiridae	Galacticus	†Galacticus duerri		Endemic	Earliest known occurrence of a Cryptochirid, ichnofossil	
Diogenidae	Petrochirus					
Leucosiidae	Persephona	Persephona cf. subovata				Persephona cf. subovata fossil claw fragment from the Pinecrest Beds of Sarasota
Majidae	Incertae sedis					
Menippidae	Menippe	Menippe mercenaria				
Menippidae	Incertae sedis					
Paguroidea (Families outside of Diogenidae unknown)	Various				Known from the presence of Helicotaphrichnus commensalis	
Porcellanidae	Petrolisthes	†Petrolisthes myakkensis	Pinecrest Beds		Formed commensal relationships with the locally extinct Heliaster microbrachius	
Xanthidae	Paractaea	Paractaea cf. nodosa	Pinecrest Beds			

=== Ostracoda ===
Family	Genus	Species	Member	Abundance	Notes	Image
Bairdiidae	Bairdoppilata	Bairdoppilata sp.	Pinecrest Beds	Rare		
Cushmanideidae	Hulingsina	†Hulingsina semicircularis	Pinecrest Beds	Extremely Common	Validity Unclear	
Cytherellidae	Cytherelloidea	†Cytherelloidea umbonata	Pinecrest Beds	Rare		
Cytherettidae	Protocytheretta	Protocytheretta reticulata	Pinecrest Beds	Rare	Validity Unclear	
Cytheruridae	Cytherura	Cytherura sp.	Pinecrest Beds	Rare		
Hemicytheridae	†Malzella	†Malzella floridiana	Pinecrest Beds	Common		Malzella floridiana upside-down in the Pinecrest Sands of Hillsborough County
Hemicytheridae	Orionina	Orionina vaughni	Pinecrest Beds	Extremely Common		
Hemicytheridae	Puriana	†Puriana rugipunctata	Pinecrest Beds	Extremely Common		
Hemicytheridae	Radimella	†Radimella confragosa	Pinecrest Beds	Extremely Common		
Loxoconchidae	Loxoconcha	Loxoconcha sp. 1	Pinecrest Beds	Extremely Common		
Loxoconchidae	Loxoconcha	Loxoconcha sp. 2	Pinecrest Beds	Extremely Common		
Paracytherideidae	Paracytheridea	Paracytheridea altila	Pinecrest Beds	Extremely Common	Validity Unclear	
Thaerocytheridae	Hermanites	Hermanites ascitus	Pinecrest Beds	Rare	Validity Unclear	
Trachyleberididae	†Actinocythereis	†Actinocythereis sp.	Pinecrest Beds	Extremely Common		
Trachyleberididae	Cativella	Cativella sp.	Pinecrest Beds	Rare	Endemic	
Trachyleberididae	Climocoidea	Climocoidea sp.	Pinecrest Beds	Rare	Climocoidea (Proteoconcha) sp.	
Trachyleberididae	Costa	†Costa triplistriata	Pinecrest Beds	Rare		
Trachyleberididae	Echinocythereis	†Echinocythereis garretti	Pinecrest Beds	Rare		
Trachyleberididae	Pterygocythereis	†Pterygocythereis inexpectata	Pinecrest Beds	Rare		

== Echinoderms ==
=== Sea stars ===
Family	Genus	Species	Member	Abundance	Notes	Image
Heliasteridae	Heliaster	Heliaster microbrachius	Pinecrest Beds	Common in some areas	Formed commensal relationships with the extinct porcelain crab, Petrolisthes myakkensis. The species only occurs in the Pacific Ocean today.	Modern Heliaster microbrachius from the Smithsonian’s Museum of Natural History
Heliasteridae	Heliaster	Unnamed species	Bayshore (Note: Petuch regards the Bayshore unit as a separate formation. As of 2026 it is still regarded as a member of the Tamiami Formation by the PRI.)	Common		
Indeterminate				Common	Ossicles	

=== Sea urchins ===
Family	Genus	Species	Member	Abundance	Notes	Image
Arbaciidae	Arbacia	†Arbacia crenulata				
Brissidae	Brissus	†Brissus glenni				
Brissidae	Plagiobrissus	†Plagiobrissus sarae				
Cassidulidae	Rhyncholampas	†Rhyncholampas ayresi				
Cassidulidae	†Rhynchopygus	†Rhynchopygus evergladensis				
Cidaridae	Eucidaris	Eucidaris tribuloides				Live Eucidaris tribuloides
Clypeasteridae	Clypeaster	†Clypeaster crassus				
Clypeasteridae	Clypeaster	†Clypeaster romani				
Clypeasteridae	Clypeaster	†Clypeaster sunnilandensis			Taxonomic status unclear	
Clypeasteridae	Clypeaster	Clypeaster indet.				The test of Clypeaster rosaceus, a contemporary species living in the area.
Loveniidae	Echinocardium	†Echinocardium orthonotum				
Mellitidae	Encope	†Encope michelini				
Mellitidae	Encope	†Encope tamiamiensis		Common in some units	Index taxon	
Mellitidae	Mellita	†Mellita aclinensis				Metilla aclinensis fragment from the Pinecrest Beds of Sarasota County
Toxopneustidae	Lytechinus	Lytechinus variegatus				Live Lytechinus variegatus

== Foraminifera ==
Foraminifera are testate amoebae used often in biochronology and paleoecology. Many more species are known but remain unnamed/undescribed as of 2026.

Family	Genus	Species	Member	Abundance	Notes	Image
Ammoniidae	Ammonia	Ammonia tepida	Pinecrest Beds	Extremely Common		Ammonia tepida from the Pinecrest Beds
Amphisteginidae	Amphistegina					
Asterigerinidae	Asterigerina			Rare		
Asteronionidae	Asteronion			Rare		
Bolivinitidae	Bolivina			Uncommon		
Buliminellidae	Buliminella	Buliminella elegantissima				
Buliminellidae	Buliminella	†Buliminella elongata				
Cancrisidae	Valvulineria			Rare		
Cibididae	Cibicides			Uncommon		
Cribroelphiidae	Cribroelphidium	Cribroelphidium gunteri		Extremely Common		
Cribroelphiidae	Cribroelphidium	Cribroelphidium poeyanum		Extremely Common		
Cribroelphiidae	Cribroelphidium	Cribroelphidium cf. poeyanum		Extremely Common		
Discorbidae	Discorbis			Rare		
Elphidiinae	Elphidium			Extremely Common		
Elphidiinae	Elphidium	Elphidium discoidale		Extremely Common		Elphidium discoidale from the Pinecrest Beds of Hillsborough County, Florida
Eponididae	Eponides			Extremely Rare		
Globigerinidae	Globigerina	Globigerina bulloides				A rendering of Globigerina bulloides in life.
Globigerinidae	Globigerinoides			Extremely Rare		
Globigerinidae	†Globoturborotalita	†Globoturborotalita nepenthes	Lower, Pinecrest Beds			
Globigerinidae	†Sphaeroidinellopsis	†Sphaeroidinellopsis seminulina	Lower, Pinecrest Beds	Common		
Hauerinidae	Hauerina		Pinecrest Beds	Common in Unit 7a		
Hauerinidae	Pyrgo		Pinecrest Beds	Rare		
Haynesinidae	Haynesina			Uncommon		
Lagenidae	Lagena			Rare		
Litoulidae	Ammobaculites		Pinecrest Beds, Fruitville	Common or Rare, depending on locality		
Miliamminidae	Miliammina		Pinecrest Beds	Extremely Rare; 1 specimen		
Miliolidae	Quinqueloculina	Multiple Species	Pinecrest Beds	Extremely Common in Unit 7a, and Unit 4		Quinqueloculina from Donegal Bay, Ireland
Miliolidae	Triloculina		Pinecrest Beds	Common		
Nonionidae	Nonion			Rare		
Nonionidae	Nonionella			Uncommon		
Peneroplidae	Peneroplis			Extremely Rare		
Planorbulinidae	Planorbulina			Rare		
Planulinidae	Planulina			Common		
Polymorphinidae	Guttulina			Very Rare		
Reussellidae	Reussella			Very Rare		
Rosalinidae	Neoconorbina	Neoconorbina sp.		Extremely Rare		
Rosalinidae	Neoconorbina	Neoconorbina terquemi		Rare		
Rosalinidae	Rosalina	Rosalina subaraucana		Common in some units		
Rotaliidae	†Rotalia			Rare		
Sprillinidae	Sprillina			Rare		
Spiroloculinidae	Spiroloculina			Very Rare		
Spiroplectamminidae	Vulvulina			Extremely Rare; 1 specimen		
Textulariidae	Textularia			Rare		Textularia sp.
Trochamminidae	Trochammina			Rare		
Vaginulinidae	Lenticulina			Rare		
Verneuilinidae	Gaudryina			Rare		

== Mammals ==
Known from the Macasphalt Shell Pit, St. Petersburg Times, the Brighton Canal and various sites along the Kissimmee river. The Bone Valley Formation's Palmetto Fauna is contemporary with the Lower Tamiami Formation, reflecting deposits in a nearby estuary (The Bone Valley Estuary).

family	Genus	Species	Member	Abundance	Notes	Image
Balaenidae	Incertae sedis	Balaenidae sp.	All		Right whale	
Balaenopteridae	Balaenoptera	Balaenoptera sp.	Pinecrest Beds		Rorqual	
Balaenopteridae	†Cetotheriophanes	†Cetotheriophanes capellinii	Pinecrest Beds		Extinct Rorqual	
Camelidae	†Hemiauchenia	†Hemiauchenia blancoensis	Pinecrest Beds		Camel	
Canidae	Canis	†Canis lepophagus	Pinecrest Beds	Macasphalt Shell Pit	Ancestor of wolves and coyotes	
Cervidae	Odocoileus	Odocoileus cf. virginianus	Pinecrest Beds		Probable White-Tailed Deer	
Cricetidae	Sigmodon	†Sigmodon medius	Pinecrest Beds		Cotton rat	
Dasypodidae	Dasypus	†Dasypus bellus	Pinecrest Beds		The “Beautiful Armadillo”	Dasypus bellus skull
Dasypodidae	†Pachyarmatherium	†Pachyarmatherium leiseyi	Pinecrest Beds		Large armadillo	
Delphinidae	Incertae sedis	Delphinidae sp. 1			Dolphin	Delphinid rostrum from the Bone Valley Formation, a contemporary deposit of the Lower Tamiami (s.l.)
Delphinidae	Incertae sedis	Delphinidae sp. 2			Dolphin	Delphinid rostrum from the Bone Valley Formation, a contemporary deposit of the Lower Tamiami (s.l.)
Dugongidae	Incertae sedis	Dugongidae sp.	All Members		Dugong	A cross section of a Dugongid rib from the Bone Valley Formation’s Palmetto Fauna, a contemporary deposit to the lower Tamiami Formation (s.l.)
Equidae	†Cormohipparion	†Cormohipparion emsliei	Pinecrest Beds			
Equidae	Equus	"Advanced" Equus				“Advanced” Equus from a stratum equivalent to the Tamiami in North Florida
Equidae	Equus	†Equus cf. simplicidens			Zebra	
Equidae	†Nannippus	†Nannippus aztecus				
Equidae	†Nannippus	†Nannippus peninsulatus	Pinecrest Beds		Three-Toed Horse	
Geomyidae	Orthogeomys	†Orthogeomys propinetis	Pinecrest Beds		Giant gopher	
†Glyptodontidae	†Glyptotherium	†Glyptotherium cf. arizonae	Pinecrest Beds			
†Gompotheriidae	†Ambelodon (?)	indet.	Pinecrest Beds			
†Gompotheriidae	†Cuvieronius	indet.	Pinecrest Beds			
†Gompotheriidae	†Rhynchotherium	†Rhynchotherium falconeri	Pinecrest Beds			
Hyaenidae	†Chasmaporthetes	†Chasmaporthetes ossifragus	Pinecrest Beds		Hyena	Chasmaporthetes ossifragus at the Florida Museum of Natural History
Hydrochaeridae	†Neochoerus	†Neochoerus dichroplax	Pinecrest Beds		Extinct giant capybara	Neochoerus dichroplax incisor tooth
Leporidae	Sylvilagus		Pinecrest Beds		Cottontail Rabbit	Sylvilagus sp. from the Pamlico or Tamiami formation of Hardee County
Odobenidae	†Ontocetus	†Ontocetus emmonsi	Pinecrest Beds		Walrus	
†Pampatheriidae	†Holmesina	†Holmesina floridanus	Pinecrest Beds			Holmesina
Phocidae	†Callophoca	†Callophoca obscura	Pinecrest Beds		Earless Seal	
Physeterinae	†Physeterula	†Physeterula sp.	Pinecrest Beds		Sperm whale	Fragmentary Physeterula tooth from the Bone Valley Formation
Procyonidae	Procyon	†Procyon rexroadensis			Large raccoon	
†Megalonychidae	†Megalonyx	†Megalonyx leptostomus	Pinecrest Beds		Giant sloth	
†Megatheriidae	†Eremotherium	†Eremotherium eomigrans	Pinecrest Beds		Oldest occurrence of Eremotherium in North America (Giant Ground Sloth)	Eremotherium eomigrans claw core from the unconformity between the Bermont Formation and the Fort Thompson Formation of Hillsborough County
Mustelidae	†Trigonictis	†Trigonictis macrodon			Relative of the Grison	
†Mylodontidae	†Glossotherium	†Glossotherium chapadmalense	Pinecrest Beds		Giant Sloth	Glossotherium sp. jaw from the Okeechobee Group
Sciuridae	†Miopetaurista	Potentially present				
Tayassuidae	†Mylohyus	†Mylohyus floridanus			Long-Nosed Peccary	Mylohyus tooth from the Late Pliocene or Early Pleistocene of Florida
Tayassuidae	†Platygonus	†Platygonus bicalcaratus				
Ursidae	†Arctodus	†Arctodus pristinus			Short-faced bear	

== Mollusks ==
Mollusks form the majority of the biodiversity of the Tamiami Formation, with around 800 species of gastropods or more known.

=== Bivalves ===
Family	Genus	Species	Member	Abundance	Notes	Image
Anomiidae	Anomia	Anomia simplex				Anomia simplex from the Fort Thompson formation of the Leisey Shell Pit
Anomiidae	Placunanomia	†Placunanomia plicata	Murdock Station		Unassessed	
Arcidae	Anadara	†Anadara aequalitas				
Arcidae	Anadara	Anadara brasiliana				
Arcidae	Anadara	†Anadara crassicosta				Anadara crassicosta from the Pinecrest Beds of Sarasota.
Arcidae	Arca	†Arca aquila				
Arcidae	Arca	Arca zebra			Turkey wing	
Arcidae	Arca	†Arca wagneriana				Arca wagneriana from the Pinecrest Beds of Sarasota County
Arcidae	Barbatia	†Barbatia caloosahatchiensis				
Arcidae	Barbatia	†Barbatia irregularis	Murdock Station, Pinecrest Beds			
Arcidae	Cucullaearca	Cucullaearca candida				
Cardiidae	Acrosterigma	†Acrosterigma dalli	Pinecrest Beds			Acrosterigma dalli
Cardiidae	Agnocardia	†Agnocardia spinosifrons	Pinecrest Beds			
Cardiidae	Trachycardium	†Trachycardium evergladeensis				Trachycardium evergladeensis from the Tamiami Formation of Hillsborough County
Chamidae	Arcinella	Arcinella cornuta				Arcinella cornuta
Chamidae	Chama	†Chama willcoxi				Chama willcoxi from the Pinecrest Beds of Hillsborough County, Florida
Gastrochaenolitidae	Gastrochaenolites				Ichnofossil Lithophaga	
Glycymerididae	Costaglycymeris	†Costaglycymeris subovata	Pinecrest Beds			
Glycymerididae	Glycymeris	†Glycymeris aberrans	Pinecrest Beds			
Glycymerididae	Glycymeris	Glycymeris americana	Pinecrest Beds, Lower		American Bittersweet, also known from the Late Oligocene-Early Miocene	
Glycymerididae	Glycymeris	Glycymeris decussata	Pinecrest Beds			
Glycymerididae	Glycymeris	†Glycymeris laevis	Pinecrest Beds			
Glycymerididae	Tucetona	Tucetona pectinata				
Gryphaeidae	Hyotissa	†Hyotissa haitensis	Pinecrest Beds, Lower, Ochopee Limestone, Buckingham Limestone			Hyotissa haitensis from the Pinecrest beds of Hillsborough County
Lucinidae	Anodontia	Anodontia alba	Pinecrest Beds			Fossil of Anodontia alba from the Tamiami Formation
Lucinidae	Stewartia	Stewartia floridana			Chemosymbiotic	Fossil Stewartia floridana from a hurricane deposit in the Pinecrest Beds of Hillsborough County, Florida
Mytilidae	Brachidontes	Brachidontes exustus	Pinecrest beds			
Mytilidae	Lithophaga		Golden Gates		Maker of the trace fossil Gastrochaenolites	
Mytilidae	Perna	†Perna conradina	Lower, Ochopee Limestone, Pinecrest Beds, Murdock Station			Perna conradina from the Pinecrest Beds of Hillsborough County, hurricane deposit
Pectinidae	Amusium	†Amusium mortoni				
Pectinidae	Argopecten	†Argopecten comparilis				
Pectinidae	Argopecten	Argopecten gibbus				
Pectinidae	†Carolinapecten	†Carolinapecten eboreus	Lower, Pinecrest Beds			Carolinapecten eboreus from the lower Tamiami Formation
Pectinidae	†Carolinapecten	†Carolinapecten murdockensis	Murdock Station			
Pectinidae	†Carolinapecten	†Carolinapecten urbannaensis	Bayshore			
Pectinidae	†Chesapecten	†Chesapecten jeffersonius	Murdock Station			
Pectinidae	†Chesapecten	†Chesapecten madisonius				
Pectinidae	†Chesapecten	†Chesapecten middlesexensis	Murdock Station, Bayshore			
Pectinidae	†Chesapecten	†Chesapecten quinarius	Murdock Station			
Pectinidae	†Chesapecten	†Chesapecten septenarius	lower			
Pectinidae	Euvola	†Euvola hemicyclina	Lower, Pinecrest Beds			
Pectinidae	Interchlamys	†Interchlamys interlineata				
Pectinidae	Leptopecten	†Leptopecten irremotis	Lower			
Pectinidae	Lindapecten					
Pectinidae	Nodipecten	†Nodipecten collierensis	Lower, Buckingham Limestone, Ochopee Limestone, Pinecrest Beds			
Pectinidae	Nodipecten	†Nodipecten condylomatus		Unknown		
Pectinidae	Nodipecten	†Nodipecten peedeensis	Buckingham			
Pectinidae	Stralopecten	†Stralopecten caloosaensis				
Plicatulidae	Plicatula	Plicatula gibbosa				
Plicatulidae	Plicatula	†Plicatula hunterae	Pinecrest Beds, Murdock Station			
Plicatulidae	Plicatula	Plicatula marginata	Lower, Pinecrest Beds, Fruitville, Buckingham Limestone, Murdock Station			
Veneridae	Anomalocardia	†Anomalocardia caloosana			Validity unassessed	
Veneridae	Anomalocardia	Anomalocardia cuneimeris				
Veneridae	Chione	†Chione erosa		Extremely Common	An extinct Venerid clam	Chione erosa with naticid borings
Veneridae	Chione	†Chione morsitans			Validity unclear	Chione(?) morsitans, from the Pinecrest Beds of Hillsborough County
Veneridae	Chioneryx	Chioneryx grus	Pinecrest Beds			
Veneridae	Mercenaria	Mercenaria campechiensis				
Veneridae	Mercenaria	†Mercenaria corrugata	Pinecrest Beds, Buckingham		Validity unassessed	Mercenaria corrugata from the Pinecrest Beds
Veneridae	Panchione	†Panchione ulocyma	Pinecrest Beds, Ochopee limestone			Panchione ulocyma
Verticordiidae	Trigonulina	Trigonulina ornata	Pinecrest Beds		A carnivorous clam.	

=== Cephalopods ===
Family	Genus	Species	Member	Abundance	Notes	Image
Oichnidae	Oichnus	Oichnus ovalis	Pinecrest Beds		Ichnofossil octopus	

=== Gastropods ===
Family	Genus	Species	Member	Abundance	Notes	Image
Amathinidae	Iselica	Iselica globosa	Pinecrest Beds			
Architectonicidae	Architectonica	†Architectonica catanesi				
Architectonicidae	Architectonica	†Architectonica granulatum			Validity unknown	
Architectonicidae	Architectonica	Architectonica nobilis				
Buccinoidea	Ptychosalpinx	†Ptychosalpinx perprotractus				
Busyconidae	Busycoarctum	†Busycoarctum tudiculatum	Buckingham			
Busyconidae	Busycon	†Busycon alumensis	Buckingham		Validity unknown	
Busyconidae	Busycon	Busycon carica	Pinecrest Beds			Busycon carica from the latest Holocene of east Florida
Busyconidae	Busycon	†Busycon filosum	Buckingham		Unassessed	
Busyconidae	Busycon	†Busycon pachyus	Buckingham			
Busyconidae	Busycon	†Busycon rampum	Pinecrest Beds			
Busyconidae	Busycon	†Busycon titan				
Busyconidae	Busycon	†Busycon tritonis				
Busyconidae	Busycon	†Busycon tudiculatum				
Busyconidae	Busycotypus	†Busycotypus concinnus				
Busyconidae	Busycotypus	†Busycotypus libertiensis	Buckingham			
Busyconidae	Busycotypus	†Busycotypus mansfieldi				
Busyconidae	Busycotypus	†Busycotypus scotti				
Busyconidae	Fulguropsis	†Fulguropsis carolinensis	Buckingham		Validity unknown	
Busyconidae	Fulguropsis	†Fulguropsis excavatum			Validity unknown	
Busyconidae	Fulguropsis	†Fulguropsis floridanum			Validity unknown	
Busyconidae	†Laevisycon	†Laevisycon laeva				
Busyconidae	†Pyruella	†Pyruella harasewychi	Buckingham			
Busyconidae	†Pyruella	†Pyruella miccosukee				
Busyconidae	†Pyruella	†Pyruella rogicostata	Pinecrest Beds	Endemic	Validity unknown	
Busyconidae	†Pyruella	†Pyruella sarasotaensis			Validity unknown	
Busyconidae	†Pyruella	†Pyruella seminole	Pinecrest Beds	Endemic	Validity unknown	
Busyconidae	†Pyruella	†Pyruella turbinalis			Validity unknown	Pyruella turbinalis
Busyconidae	†Pyruella	†Pyruella waltfrancei	Buckingham			
Busyconidae	Sinistrofulgur	†Sinistrofulgur caloosahatcheensis				
Busyconidae	Sinistrofulgur	†Sinistrofulgur contrarium	Lower, Ochopee Limestone, Pinecrest Beds, Fruitville, Buckingham Limestone			Sinistrofulgur contrarium from the Pinecrest Beds of Hillsborough County.
Busyconidae	Sinistrofulgur	†Sinistrofulgur grabaui	Buckingham			
Busyconidae	Sinistrofulgur	†Sinistrofulgur hollisteri	Buckingham			
Cancellariidae	Cancellaria	†Cancellaria conradiana	Pinecrest Beds			Cancellaria conradiana from the Pinecrest Beds of Hillsborough County
Cancellariidae	Cancellaria	Cancellaria reticulata				
Cancellariidae	Cancellaria	†Cancellaria tabulata			Unassessed	
Conidae	Conasprella	Conasprella delessertii				
Conidae	Conasprella	Conasprella jaspidea				
Conidae	Conasprella	Conasprella stearnsii				
Conidae	†Contraconus	†Contraconus adversarius	Pinecrest Beds, Fruitville member			Contraconus adversarius from the Pinecrest Beds of Hillsborough County
Conidae	†Contraconus	†Contraconus berryi				
Conidae	†Contraconus	†Contraconus lindajoyceae	Buckingham			
Conidae	Conus	†Conus bassi				
Conidae	Conus	†Conus gravesae				
Conidae	Conus	†Conus haytensis				
Conidae	Conus	†Conus miamiensis				
Conidae	Conus	†Conus oniscus				
Conidae	Conus	†Conus paranobilis				
Conidae	Conus	Conus spurius				Conus spurius? from the Fruitville member of Manatee County
Conidae	Conus	†Conus spuroides				Conus spuroides from the Caloosahatchee Formation of Hillsborough County
Conidae	Conus	†Conus yaquensis				Conus yaquensis from the Fruitville member of Manatee County
Conidae	†Osceolaconus	†Osceolaconus buckinghamensis	Buckingham		All Known Osceolaconus are present in the Tamiami Formation	
Conidae	†Osceolaconus	†Osceolaconus matchetti	Pinecrest Beds		All Known Osceolaconus are present in the Tamiami Formation	
Conidae	†Osceolaconus	†Osceolaconus osceolae			All Known Osceolaconus are present in the Tamiami Formation	
Cypraeidae	†Alkleistostoma	†Alkleistostoma carolinensis				
Cypraeidae	†Alkleistostoma	†Alkleistostoma crocodila				
Cypraeidae	†Alkleistostoma	†Alkleistostoma diegelae				
Cypraeidae	†Alkleistostoma	†Alkleistostoma floridana				
Cypraeidae	†Alkleistostoma	†Alkleistostoma highlandsensis	Pinecrest Beds (Kissimmee Facies)			
Cypraeidae	†Alkleistostoma	†Alkleistostoma hughesi	Pinecrest Beds (Kissimmee Facies)			
Cypraeidae	†Alkleistostoma	†Alkleistostoma miamiensis	Golden Gates Reef (Petuch's Zones 3–4)			
Cypraeidae	†Alkleistostoma	†Alkleistostoma pilsbryi				
Cypraeidae	†Calusacypraea	†Calusacypraea briani				
Cypraeidae	†Calusacypraea	†Calusacypraea duerri	Buckingham			
Cypraeidae	†Calusacypraea	†Calusacypraea sarasotaensis				
Cypraeidae	†Calusacypraea	†Calusacypraea tequesta				
Cypraeidae	†Pseudadusta	†Pseudadusta buckinghamensis	Buckingham			
Cypraeidae	†Pseudadusta	†Pseudadusta collierensis	Golden Gates Reef (Petuch's Zones 1–2)			
Cypraeidae	†Pseudadusta	†Pseudadusta fehsei	Golden Gates Reef (Petuch's Zones 1–2)			
Cypraeidae	†Pseudadusta	†Pseudadusta irisae	Golden Gates Reef (Petuch's Zones 1–2)			
Cypraeidae	†Pseudadusta	†Pseudadusta ketteri	Golden Gates Reef (Petuch's Zones 1–2)			
Cypraeidae	†Pseudadusta	†Pseudadusta lindae	Golden Gates Reef (Petuch's Zones 1–2)			
Cypraeidae	†Siphocypraea	†Siphocypraea alligator				
Cypraeidae	†Siphocypraea	†Siphocypraea cannoni				
Cypraeidae	†Siphocypraea	†Siphocypraea problematica				
Cypraeidae	†Siphocypraea	†Siphocypraea trippeana				
Cypraeidae	†Yeehawcypraea	†Yeehawcypraea bartoni				
†Echinofulguridae	†Echinofulgur	†Echinofulgur cannoni	Buckingham			
Fasciolariidae	Apertifusus					
Fasciolariidae	Cinctura	†Cinctura rhomboidea	Pinecrest beds			
Fasciolariidae	Fasciolaria					
Fasciolariidae	Fusinus	†Fusinus caloosaensis				
Fasciolariidae	Fusinus	†Fusinus carolinensis				Fusinus caloosaensis from the Pinecrest Beds of Hillsborough County
Fasciolariidae	Fusinus	†Fusinus equalis				
Fasciolariidae	Fusinus	†Fusinus florida				
Fasciolariidae	Heilprinia	†Heilprinia dianeae	Buckingham			
Melongenidae	Melongena	Melongena bispinosa			Locally Extinct	Melongena bispinosa from the Pinecrest Beds of Hillsborough County
Melongenidae	Melongena	†Melongena cannoni				
Melongenidae	Melongena	†Melongena consors				
Melongenidae	Melongena	Melongena corona				Melongena corona from the Pinecrest Beds of Sarasota
Melongenidae	Melongena	†Melongena cynthiae				Melongena cynthiae from the Pinecrest Beds of Hillsborough County
Melongenidae	Melongena	†Melongena draperi	Lower Fruitville and Pinecrest Beds			Melongena draperi from the Pinecrest Beds of Hillsborough County
Melongenidae	Melongena	Melongena melongena				Melongena melongena from the latest Holocene of the Bahamas
Melongenidae	Melongena	†Melongena penningtonorum				
Melongenidae	Melongena	†Melongena sarasotaensis	Fruitville			
Melongenidae	Melongena	†Melongena taurus	Pinecrest beds		Validity unclear	
Melongenidae	†Tropochasca	†Tropochasca lindae	Pinecrest Beds			
Melongenidae	†Tropochasca	†Tropochasca metae	Fruitville			
Melongenidae	†Tropochasca	†Tropochasca petiti	Buckingham			
Melongenidae	†Tropochasca	Unnamed species	Bayshore			
Muricidae	Aspella	†Aspella petuchi	Pinecrest Beds	Endemic		
Muricidae	†Calusathais	†Calusathais handgenae	Bayshore			
Muricidae	Chicoreus	†Chicoreus floridanus	Pinecrest Beds		Unassessed	
Muricidae	Chicoreus	†Chicoreus stephansae	Pinecrest Beds			
Muricidae	†Ecphora	†Ecphora pachycostata	Murdock Station			
Muricidae	†Ecphora	†Ecphora quadricostata	Buckingham, Pinecrest Beds, Murdock Station	Extremely rare, Lowermost Pinecrest Beds		Ecphora quadricostata, formation unknown.
Muricidae	†Ecphora	†Ecphora roxaneae	Murdock Station			
Muricidae	†Ecphora	†Ecphora whiteoakensis	Bayshore			
Muricidae	Eupleura	Eupleura				
Muricidae	Eupleura	†Eupleura calusa				
Muricidae	Eupleura	Eupleura caudata				
Muricidae	†Globecphora	†Globecphora floridana	Bayshore	Exceptionally Rare		
Muricidae	†Latecphora	†Latecphora bradleyae	Pinecrest Beds	Extremely rare		
Muricidae	†Latecphora	†Latecphora hertweckorum	Pinecrest Beds	Extremely rare, uppermost Pinecrest Beds only		
Muricidae	†Latecphora	†Latecphora violetae	Buckingham	Extremely Rare		
Muricidae	†Planecphora	†Planecphora mansfieldi	Buckingham			
Muricidae	Urosalpinx	†Urosalpinx megeana				
Muricidae	†Zulloia	Unnamed	Bayshore			
Muricidae	†Zulloia	†Zulloia violetae	Bayshore			
Muricidae	†Zulloia	†Zulloia zulloi	Bayshore			
Nassariidae	Phrontis	Phrontis vibex				Fossil Phoenix vibex from the Tamiami Formation
Olividae	Oliva	†Oliva amandae				
Olividae	Oliva	†Oliva keatoni				
Olividae	Oliva	†Oliva mansfieldi	Golden Gate Reef			
Olividae	Oliva	†Oliva susanae	Golden Gate Reef			
Olividae	Olivella	Olivella mutica				
Olividae	Olivella	†Olivella tamiamiensis				
Olividae	Pupa	†Pupa carolinensis	Ochopee limestone, Pinecrest Beds		Unassessed	
Pisaniidae	Gemophos	Gemophos tinctus	Pinecrest Beds			
Physidae						
Pleioptygmatidae	Pleioptygma	†Pleioptygma dalli				
Pleioptygmatidae	Pleioptygma	†Pleioptygma lineolata	Pinecrest Beds		Genus is locally extinct.	Pleioptygma lineolata, a mitre snail, under UV. This photo is color inverted and its hue altered to its show probable coloration. Collected from the Pinecrest Beds of Hillsborough County
Strombidae	Lobatus	†Lobatus leideyi				
Strombidae	Lobatus	Lobatus raninus				
Strombidae	Macrostrombus	†Macrostrombus briani	Buckingham			
Strombidae	Macrostrombus	†Macrostrombus hertweckorum				
Strombidae	Strombus	†Strombus cannoni	Fruitville			
Strombidae	Strombus	†Strombus floridanus	Buckingham, Pinecrest Beds			Strombus floridanus
Strombidae	Strombus	Strombus pugilis				Strombus pugilis from the Late Pliocene - Middle Pleistocene Okeechobee Group of Florida
Strombidae	Strombus	†Strombus sarasotaensis	Fruitville			
Vasidae	†Hystrivasum	†Hystrivasum barkleyae	Buckingham			
Vasidae	†Hystrivasum	†Hystrivasum horridum				Hystrivasum horridum from the Pinecrest beds of Hillsborough County
Vasidae	†Hystrivasum	†Hystrivasum locklini				
Vasidae	†Hystrivasum	†Hystrivasum olssoni				
Vasidae	†Hystrivasum	†Hystrivasum schrinerae				
Vasidae	†Hystrivasum	†Hystrivasum squamosum				
Vasidae	†Hystrivasum	†Hystrivasum violettae	Buckingham			
Vermetidae	Petaloconchus	Petaloconchus floridanus				
Vermetidae	Petaloconchus	†Petaloconchus sculpturatus				Petaloconchus sculpturatus from the Pinecrest Beds of Hillsborough County
Vermetidae	Thylacodes	†Thylacodes granifera				
Vermetidae	Vermetus	†Vermetus virginicus				
Volutidae	Scaphella	†Scaphella ashleyae	Buckingham			
Volutidae	Scaphella	†Scaphella kendrae	Bayshore			
Volutidae	Scaphella	†Scaphella mansfieldi	Pinecrest Beds			
Volutidae	Scaphella	†Scaphella martinshugari	Pinecrest Beds			
Volutidae	Scaphella	†Scaphella petiti	Fruitville			
Volutidae	Scaphella	†Scaphella trenholmii	Pinecrest Beds			
Volutidae	Scaphella	†Scaphella typus	Fruitville			
Volutidae	Volutifusus	†Volutifusus auroraensis	Fruitville			
Volutidae	Volutifusus	†Volutifusus brennmortoni	Fruitville			
Volutidae	Volutifusus	†Volutifusus dougsheltoni	Buckingham			
Volutidae	Volutifusus	†Volutifusus emmonsi	Buckingham			
Volutidae	Volutifusus	†Volutifusus kissimmeensis	Fruitville			
Volutidae	Volutifusus	†Volutifusus obtusus	Pinecrest Beds			
Volutidae	Volutifusus	†Volutifusus spengleri				

=== Polyplacophora ===
Family	Genus	Species	Member	Abundance	Notes	Image
Chitonidae	Chiton	Chiton sp.				

=== Scaphopods ===
Family	Genus	Species	Member	Abundance	Notes	Image
Dentaliidae	Dentalium	†Dentalium caloosaense			Unassessed	
Dentaliidae	Dentalium	Dentalium ceratum				
Dentaliidae	Dentalium	Dentalium eboreum				
Dentaliidae	Dentalium	†Dentalium prisma			Unassessed	Dentalium prisma, a scaphopod needing further taxonomic assessment
Dentaliidae	Dentalium	Dentalium sp.				
Dentaliidae	Siphonodentalium	Siphonodentalium sp.				
Gadilidae	Polyschides	Polyschides quadridentatus				
Gadilidae	Gadila	Gadila sp.				

== Plants ==
Plants are known from pollen samples and spores.

=== Angiosperms ===
Family	Genus	Species	Member	Abundance	Notes	Image
Altingiaceae	Liquidamber					
Asteraceae	Aster	Aster sp.	Pinecrest Beds Units 3–4, 6–7,10, 11,		Pollen	Modern Aster pollen
Asteraceae	Cichorioideae Indet.					Indeterminate modern Asterid
Asteraceae	Indet.		Pinecrest Beds Units 3–4, 6–7, 11,			
Asteraceae	Iva	Iva sp.				
Aquifoliaceae	Ilex	Ilex sp.				
Betulaceae	Betula	Betula sp.			Birch pollen	
Fabaceae	Indet.					
Fagaceae	Fagus	Fagus sp.			Beech	
Quercus	Quercus sp.				Oak	Quercus sp. from the Bone Valley Formation of Polk County, a contemporary of the Lower Tamiami (s.l.)
Juglandaceae	Juglans	Juglans sp.				
Lamiaceae	Indet.					
Platanaceae	Platanus	Platanus sp.				
Poaceae	Indet.					
Polygonaceae	Polygonum	Polygonum sp.				
Sapindaceae	Acer	Acer sp.	Pinecrest Beds, Units 6–7,10 (Petuch zones)			

=== Conifers ===
Family	Genus	Species	Member	Abundance	Notes	Image
Pinaceae	Pinus	Indet.	Pinecrest Beds	Common	Pollen	

=== Chlorophytines ===
Family	Genus	Species	Member	Abundance	Notes	Image
Halimedaceae	Halimeda	Indet.	Golden Gates Reef	common		

=== Ferns ===
Family	Genus	Species	Member	Abundance	Notes	Image
Osmundaceae	Osmunda					
Polypodiaceae	Polypodium					
Lycopodiaceae	Lycopodium					

== Porifera ==
Family	Genus	Species	Member	Abundance	Notes	Image
Clionaidae	Cliona			common	Known from the presence of Entobia	Entobia sp. on a weathered Perna conradina from the Pinecrest Beds
Entobiaidae	Entobia			common	Ichnofossil Cliona and Siphonodictyon	Entobia sp. on a weathered Perna conradina from the Pinecrest Beds
Indeterminate				Extremely common	Spiracles	
Phloeodictyidae	Siphonodictyon					

== Reptiles ==
=== Aves ===
Family	Genus	Species	Member	Abundance	Notes	Image
Anatidae	†Anabernicula	†Anabernicula sp.	Pinecrest Beds (Bird Layer)		Pygmy goose	
Anatidae	Anas					
Anatidae	Aythya					
Anatidae	Dendrocygna					
Ardeidae	Ardea					Ardea sp. femur from the bird layer of the Pinecrest Beds of Sarasota County
Ardeidae	Botaurus					
Ardeidae	Egretta	Egretta sp.			Egret	
Cathartidae	Gymnogyps		Pinecrest Beds (Bird Layer)	One bone	Condor	
Larinae	Larus	Larus sp. 1	Pinecrest Beds (Bird Layer)			
Larinae	Larus	Larus sp. 2	Pinecrest Beds (Bird Layer)			
Phalacrocoracidae	Phalacrocorax	†Phalacrocorax filyawi	Pinecrest Beds (Bird Layer)	137 articulated complete and partial skeletons	Cormorant, officially assigned to Phalacrocorax but is closest related to members of Urile	Phalacrocorax filyawi bones from the Bird Layer of the Pinecrest Beds of Sarasota County
Phoenicopteridae	Phoenicopterus	Phoenicopterus sp.			flamingo	
Podicipedidae	Podilymbus	Podilymbus podiceps			Grebes	
Podicipedidae	Incertae sedis				Grebes	
Procellaridae	Indeterminate					
Rallidae	Fulica					
Rallidae	Gallinula					
Rallidae	Laterallus					
Rallidae	Porphyrula					
Rallidae	Rallus					
Scolopacidae	Calidris	Calidris alba			Sanderling	
Stercorariidae	Stercorarius	Stercorarius sp.				

=== Crocodilia ===
Family	Genus	Species	Member	Abundance	Notes	Image
Alligatoridae	Alligator	Indet				

=== Squamates ===
Family	Genus	Species	Member	Abundance	Notes	Image
Colubridae	Nerodia	Nerodia taxispilota				
Colubridae	Indeterminate					

=== Testudines ===
Family	Genus	Species	Member	Abundance	Notes	Image
Chelydridae	Macroclemys	Macroclemys cf. temminckii	Pinecrest Beds			
Emydidae	Indeterminate		Pinecrest Beds		Possibly Pseudemys platymarginata	
Emydidae	Terrapene	Terrapene cf. carolina	Pinecrest Beds		Common Box Turtle	
Emydidae	Pseudemys	†Pseudemys platymarginata	Pinecrest Beds		Extinct pond turtle	
Kinosternidae	Kinosternon	Kinosternon cf. baurii	Pinecrest Beds			
Testudinidae	†Hesperotestudo	†Hesperotestudo cf. crassiscutata	Pinecrest Beds		Extinct Giant Tortoise	Hesperotestudo sp. shell fragment of a giant tortoise from the Okeechobee Group (likely Caloosahatchee Formation) of Hillsborough County
Testudinidae	†Hesperotestudo	Indet.	Pinecrest Beds		Extinct Giant Tortoise	Hesperotestudo sp. shell fragment of a giant tortoise from the Okeechobee Group (likely Caloosahatchee Formation) of Hillsborough County
Trionychidae	Apalone	Apalone cf. ferox	Pinecrest Beds	Plasteron fragments and humerus	Florida Softshell Turtle	
