= Florida Platform =

Geological feature

Coordinates: 27.6622°N 84.0289°W

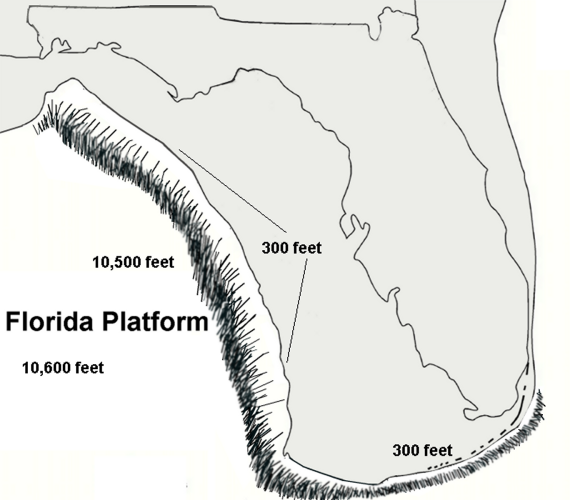
Depiction of Florida Platform with depths

The Florida Platform is a flat geological feature that underlies all of Florida and southern Alabama and Georgia and their adjacent continental shelves. The basement of the platform, composed of igneous, metamorphic, and sedimentary rocks, was originally part of the African continent that became attached to the North American continent in the Jurassic geological period. The basement rocks are overlain by up to 5 kilometers (3 mi) of evaporite, carbonate, and siliciclastic sedimentary deposits that are primarily of marine origin.

== Description ==
The Florida Platform is a large, level, and relatively stable platform of sedimentary strata on the trailing or eastern edge of the North American continent, extending between the basins of the Gulf of Mexico and the Atlantic Ocean. It underlies all of Florida and its adjacent continental shelves, as well as the southern parts of Alabama and Georgia. Most of the basement of the platform was originally part of Africa that became attached to North America during the Ordivician Period as the supercontinent of Pangaea formed. The platform separated from Africa as Pangaea broke up in the Jurassic, remaining attached to North America. The Florida Platform remained submerged for most of the Cenozoic Era, and the sedimentary strata of the platform are primarily of marine origin.

== Basement ==
The basement of the Florida Platform comprises igneous, metamorphic, and sedimentary rocks of Proterozoic, Paleozoic, and Triassic age. The top of the basement of the platform is marked by an unconformal surface of pre-Middle Jurassic age overlain by evaporite, carbonate, and siliciclastic deposits of Middle Jurassic to Holocene ages. The top of the basement is approximately 915 meters (3,000 ft) below mean sea level (MSL) in the north-central Florida peninsula, and slopes downward on the east towards the Atlantic Ocean basin, on the west towards the Gulf of Mexico basin, and on the south towards the South Florida Basin, reaching 5,180 meters (16,990 ft) below MSL in southern Florida.

The basement rocks of the Florida Platform are divided into two regions by the Bahama Fracture Zone, which runs northwestward from the Bahamas across southern Florida under the Gulf of Mexico and the extreme western end of the Florida panhandle in to Alabama. The fracture zone is also known as the Jay Fault in Florida and the Pickens–Gilbertown Fault in Alabama. Northeast of the Bahamas Fracture Zone is the Suwannee terrane, a crustal fragment that originated on the coast of what is now West Africa when it was part of Gondwana.

Southwest of the Bahama Fracture Zone in the southern part of the Florida peninsula the basement is primarily composed of the Mesozoic-age South Florida Volcanic Rocks. Across the West Florida Continental shelf and southern Florida southwest of the Bahama Fracture Zone there are several basins and arches at the top of the basement rocks discernible via seismic imaging. The Apalachicola Basin on the continental shelf is offshore of the Apalachicola Embayment or South Georgia Rift. It is bordered on the southeast in turn by the Middle Ground Arch, which extends across the Bahama Fracture Zone under Apalachee Bay, The Tampa Basin, the Sarasota Arch, and the South Florida Basin.

== Origin ==
=== Collision ===
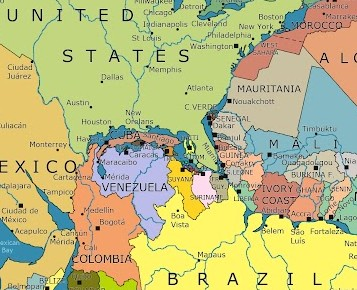
Map of Pangaea with modern countries overlaid. Florida is near the center, extending from North America southward between western Africa and northern South America.

The Florida Platform originated in Gondwana in the early Paleozoic. Data from paleontology, isotope geochemistry, and paleomagnetism studies indicate that the platform was part of the western African continental margin near Senegal. Boreholes in northern Florida that reached sandstones and shales of Paleozoic age have recovered fossils of graptolites, brachiopods, trilobites, crinoids, molluscs, conodonts, palynomorphs, and chitinozoans. The faunal assemblages resemble African or South American assemblages, but none have resembled any North American assemblage. Bore holes have also penetrated granite and other volcanic rocks. The Tallahassee–Suwannee terrane that forms the basement under northern Florida and southern Georgia (northwest of the Bahama Fracture Zone) contains rhyolitic rocks that correlate geochemically with rocks found in locations along the western margin of Africa. The St. Lucie metamorphic complex matches rocks of the Rokelide Orogen in Guinea. The Osceola Granite resembles the Coya Granite in Senegal. The Suwannee Basin sedimentary rocks have been correlated with those of the Bove Basin in Guinea-Bissau; the two features are likely remnants of an extensive basin.

In the late Paleozoic Era, Laurentia (the core of what is now North America) converged on Gondwana, closing the Iapetus Ocean and creating the Pangaea supercontinent. The part of Gondwana facing Laurentia included what are now western Africa and northern South America. The collision created strike-slip faults in Gondwana as blocks of crust moved in response to irregularities in continental margins. There are several possible faults from this period in the basement of the Florida Platform, the most prominent being the Bahama Fracture Zone. The Brunswick Magnetic Anomaly, consisting of a northern negative component and a southern positive component, runs east–west across southern Georgia and Alabama. The anomaly is commonly believed to mark the boundary between the Florida Platform and the rest of North America. An alternative explanation for the anomaly is that the North American Plate was subducted under Gondwana as the Iapetus Ocean closed, and that the anomaly marks the lower end of the subducted North American lithosphere under the Tallahassee–Suwannee terrane (the northern part of the Florida Platform), the northern boundary of which may be as much as 100 kilometers (60 mi) north of the anomaly. Another proposal is that the Brunswick Magnetic Anomaly was a Mesozoic rift basin. It has also been proposed that the Florida Magnetic Anomaly, crossing the Florida peninsula approximately from Volusia County to Hernando County, marks the suture between North America and the Florida Platform.

=== Rifting ===
Reconstructions of Pangaea place the Florida Platform at the junction of the African, North American, and South American continents. A system of rifts that would eventually produce the Atlantic Ocean began opening along the pre-Pangaea continental margins during the Triassic. The rifting is believed to have been initiated by hot spots, including one near the southern end of the Florida Platform. Isotopic signatures of the South Florida Volcanic Rocks indicate they were produced by a hot spot. The South Georgia Rift, a graben, started to form across what is now southern Georgia (along the pre-Pangaean margin between Africa and North America), but stopped and became an aulacogen, a failed arm of a triple junction. The rifting shifted, separating the Florida Platform and the Bahamas Banks from Africa and South America.

North America began separating from South America in the early Jurassic, with the Gulf of Mexico opening in the early Jurassic. Grabens and horsts in the basement of the western part of the Florida Platform may have developed due to stresses on the crust caused by the opening of the Gulf of Mexico, or may be horsts that broke off of North America and reattached to the Florida Platform. Similarly, horsts that broke off of South America may underlie southern Alabama and Mississippi. The Florida Platform has been tectonically quiet since the end of the rifting. There has been regional uplift in the sedimentary layers that have accumulated on the Florida Platform, but they are the product of epeirogenic movement caused by density changes resulting from dissolution of limestone.

== Post-rifting sediments ==
=== Jurassic and early Cretaceous sediments ===
Clastic sediments began accumulating in incipient rifts associated with the Florida Platform in the late Triassic and early Jurassic. As the Gulf of Mexico opened up in the middle Jurassic, carbonate, evaporite and siliciclastic sediments accumulated on the Florida Platform. The Apalachicola Embayment and Tampa Basin developed thick sediments of evaporite (related to the Louann Salt). Clastic sediments (Norphlet Sand) developed on top of the evaporates in the northern part of the platform, and with a later rise in sea level, the Smackover Limestone was laid down.

From the late Triasssic into the middle Jurassic, most of the Florida Platform was above sea level and no sedimentary strata have survived from that period. From the Late Jurassic through the Cretaceous into the Paleogene (early Cenozoic), sea levels were higher than at present, and most of the platform was below sea level most of the time. The platform was a rimmed shelf during the Jurassic and Cretaceous. As sea levels rose and fell during glacial cycles, layers of sediments were laid down on the submerged platform, primarily carbonate and evaporite sediments on the southern portions of the platform, while clastic deltaic and marine sediments were more common on the western and northern portions of the platform. Clastic sediments reached further south when sea levels were relatively low. Reefs formed along the western margin of the platform during the early Cretaceous, and around the southern end of the platform in the late Cretaceous, creating silled basins where thick beds of gypsum and anhydrite developed.

=== Cretaceous carbonate platforms ===
During the late Jurassic and early Cretaceous, the Florida Platform was part of a very large carbonate platform complex known as the Bahamas–Grand Banks Gigaplatform, which stretched nearly 7,000 kilometers (4,350 mi) from the Bahamas Banks through the Florida Platform and up the coast of North America to Canada, three times longer than the Great Barrier Reef. Carbonate sedimentation north of Florida ceased during the Cretaceous, likely due to some combination of the migration of much of the North American plate into colder climates, eutrophication from excessive nutrients from runoff from land and from ocean upwelling, burial by siliciclastic sediments eroding from the Appalachian mountains, and fluctuations in sea level. Carbonate sediment formation continued into the present on the Florida–Bahamas megabank because it remained in a tropical or sub-tropical climate, siliciclastic sediments did not reach the area, and it was generally not subject to environmental stress.

During most of the Cretaceous the Florida–Bahamas megaplatform extended from the West Florida Escarpment (the edge of the continental shelf west of Florida in the Gulf of Mexico) to the Blake–Bahamas Escarpment, which borders the Blake Plateau and Bahama Banks to east, and south to the middle of present-day Cuba. The Bahama Banks originated on shallow seafloor in the late Jurassic, possibly on a submerged terrane. The ocean floor subsided as the Atlantic Ocean widened, but carbonate sedimentation was able to keep pace, keeping the water over the top of the platform shallow enough to allow carbonate formation to continue. The Bahamas Banks are composed of shallow-water carbonate sediments up to 14 kilometers (8.7 mi) thick. The opening of the Suwannee Channel across southern Georgia in the mid- to late-Cretaceous carried siliciclastic sediments onto the Blake Plateau, ending carbonate formation.

The western and southern parts of the Florida–Bahamas megaplatform were subject to segmentation and drowning during the mid-Cretaceous. The southern margin of the megaplatform retreated north, but then grew southward again during the late Cretaceous and Cenozoic. The Caribbean plate collided with the North American plate in the late-Cretaceous through the Middle Eocene, causing the platform to buckle and flex, opening up the Straits of Florida, which separated the Florida Platform from the Bahama Banks and provided a passage for the Florida Current.

=== Late Cretaceous and Paleogene sediments ===
Late in the Cretaceous a trough, the Suwannee Channel or Strait, developed across southern Georgia and the Florida panhandle connecting the Tallahassee Embayment and the Southest Georgia Embayment. In the middle Eocene the Suwannee Channel was replaced by the Gulf Trough, which ran from the Chattahoochee Embayment in eastern Florida panhandle northwestward into Georgia, but did not connect to an embayment on the Atlantic coast. (The Tallahassee and Chattahoochee embayments occupied essentially the same position, and are collectively called the Apalachicola Embayment.)

The Suwannee Channel and Gulf Trough effectively separated the primarily carbonate sedimentation of the southern platform from the clastic sedimentation of the northern and western platform. The southward movement of clastic sedimentation suppressed carbonate sedimentation. When the sea level was higher the channel moved north and carbonate sediments formed over more of the platform. The channel filled in with clastic sediments during the Oligocene, as a result of lower sea levels and slower currents in the channel caused by a shift in the Gulf Stream. The Appalachian Mountains were uplifted in the Paleogene, increasing the siliciclastic sediments carried by streams towards the channels.

A seismic profile feature in Florida called the Mid-Cretaceous Sequence Boundary has been interpreted to represent a fall in sea level followed by a large rise leading to the deposit of deep-water carbonate sediments in the later Cretaceous over earlier shallow-water carbonate deposits. The sea level relative to the Florida Platform rose and fell repeatedly in the Cenozoic, alternatively uncovering and flooding parts of the platform. Evaporite deposits in the Paleogene were thinner and covered smaller areas than those in the late Cretaceous. Carbonate sedimentation was higher in the Eocene and Oligocene, while clastic sediments have predominated since the Miocene. The oldest sediments that are exposed in Florida are Eocene limestones of the Avon Park Formation at the crest of the Ocala Platform in Citrus and Levy counties.

=== Neogene sediments ===
The Florida Platform is almost completely covered by Cenozoic deposits, which vary in thickness from less than 1 meter (3 ft) in the central Florida panhandle and parts of the west-central peninsula to more than 300 meters (980 ft) in southern Florida. The Suwannee Channel/Gulf Trough, which had largely blocked southward movement of siliciclastics across the platform in the Paleogene, apparently had filled in by the end of the Oligocene and siliciclastics began accumulating over the southern platform, suppressing the formation of carbonate deposits over almost all of the platform.

The change in dominant deposition means that Paleogene (Paleocene–Eocene–Oligocene) carbonate deposits are widely overlain by Neogene (Miocene–Pliocene) siliciclastic deposits. The upper surface of the Paleogene deposits in the central and northern Florida peninsula and the Florida panhandle had eroded and developed a karst topography. The non-conformable surface between the Paleogene and Neogene deposits has a number of highs and basins. The highs include the Ocala Platform, Chattahoochee Arch, Sanford High, Saint Johns Platform, and Brevard Platform. Basins include the Gulf of Mexico Basin, Georgia Channel System (Appalacicola Embayment, Gulf Trough, Southeast Georgia Embayment, and Jacksonville Basin), Osceola Low, and Okeechobee Basin. The Peninsular Arch is an earlier feature that affected deposition in the Paleogene, but not in the Neogene. Neogene sediments are generally thick over the basins and thin on the highs.

The sea level relative to the Florida Platform fell and rose at least three times during the Miocene. The Chattahoochee and St. Marks formations were laid down when much of the platform was submerged in the Early Miocene. The Chipola, Oak Grove, and Shoal River formations, and the Hawthorn Group were laid down in the Middle Miocene. The Jackson Bluff, lower Tamiami, and other poorly defined formations were laid down in the Late Miocene.

Sea levels rose during the Pliocene, covering most of Florida. Pliocene siliciclastic sediments covered more of the platform than during any prior period, including under the Pleistocene formations of the Florida Keys. Low areas on the platform accumulated thick deposits, more than 100 meters (330 ft) in the Apalachicola Embayment, and up to 30 meters (100 ft) in the Okeechobee Basin. The Pliocene sediments in much of the panhandle, including the Citronelle and Miccosukee formations, were part of a delta complex, now covered by the Northern and Western Highlands of Florida. In the Apalachicola Embayment and Gulf Trough the Jackson Bluff and Intracoastal formations were laid down. The Cypresshead, Nashua, and Caloosahatchee formations form a gradient from north to south on the peninsula, complicated by the erosion and southward transportation of Cypresshead sediments. Florida south of Lake Okeechobee was a broad lagoon during the Pliocene, probable rimmed by reefs and barrier islands. The Peace River and upper Tamiami formations were laid down over southern Florida during the Pliocene.

=== Quaternary sediments ===
The sea level in relation to the Florida Platform rose and fell during Pleistocene in response to cycles of glaciation. Geologists have identified several marine terraces from the Pleistocene, believed to have been created when sea level stood at a higher level for a prolonged period. The Anastasia, Caloosahatchee, and Fort Thompson formations, and the Key Largo and Miami limestones were laid down in the Pleistocene.

== Escarpment ==
The platform's western edge, or Florida Escarpment, is normally defined where water depths at 90 meters (300 ft) drop dramatically and in a short distance to 3,000 meters (10,000 ft). The Florida peninsula is located on the eastern side of the platform, where in places it lies only 5 to 6.5 kilometers (3 to 4 mi) from the platform's edge. On the gulf side the platform ends over 160 kilometers (100 mi) to the west of the modern shoreline, where a massive cliff rises over 1,800 meters (6,000 ft) from the 3,200 meters (10,600 ft) depth of the gulf floor. The western reaches of the platform just off Tampa were explored by the submersible DSV Alvin in 1984 and the NOAAS Okeanos Explorer in 2018. Examination has placed the depth of carbonate rocks at greater than 6,100 meters (20,000 ft).

== See also ==
- Central Atlantic magmatic province

== Sources ==
- Boote, Susannah K.; Knapp, James H. (December 2016). "Offshore extent of Gondwanan Paleozoic strata in the southeastern United States: The Suwannee suture zone revisited". Gondwana Research. 40: 199–210. doi:10.1016/j.gr.2016.08.011. ISSN 1342-937X.
- Randazzo, Anthony F.; Jones, Douglas S., eds. (1997). The Geology of Florida. Gainesville, Florida: University Press of Florida. ISBN 9780813014968.
  - Heatherington, Ann L.; Mueller, Paul A. "Geochemistry and Origin of Florida Crustal Basement Terranes". In Randazzo & Jones (1997), pp. 27–3.
  - Hine, Albert C. "Structural and Paleoceanographic Evolution of the Margins of the Florida Platform". In Randazzo & Jones (1997), pp. 169–194.
  - Randazzo, Anthony F. "The Sedimentary Platform of Florida: Mesozoic to Cenozoic". In Randazzo & Jones (1997), pp. 39–56.
  - Schmidt, Walter. "Geomorphology and Physiography of Florida". In Randazzo & Jones (1997), pp. 1–12.
  - Scott, Thomas M. "Miocene to Holocene History of Florida". In Randazzo & Jones (1997), pp. 57–68.
  - Smith, Douglas L.; Lord, Kenneth M. "Tectonic Evolution and Geophysics of the Florida Basement". In Randazzo & Jones (1997), pp. 13–26.
- Scott, Thomsas M. (2011). "Geology of the Florida Platform: Pre-Mesozoic to Recent". In Buster, Noreen A.; Holmes, Charles W. (eds.). Gulf of Mexico Origin, Waters, and Biota: Volume 3, Geology. Texas A&M University Press. ISBN 978-1-60344-290-9.
