= Miami Limestone =

Geologic formation in Florida, USA

- Stratigraphic range: Pleistocene
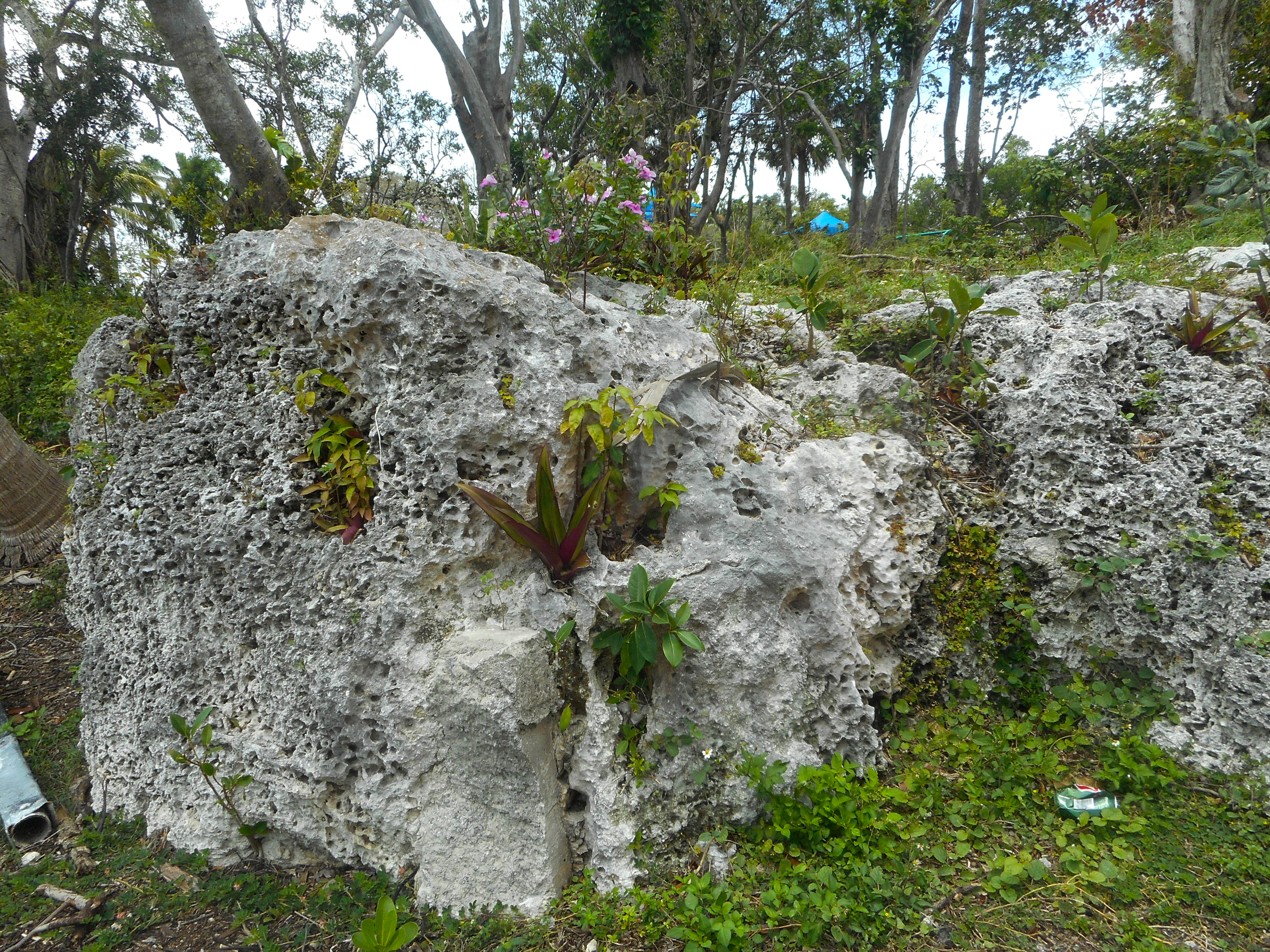
- Outcrop at Alice Wainwright Park
- Type: Formation

Location
- Region: Florida
- Country: United States

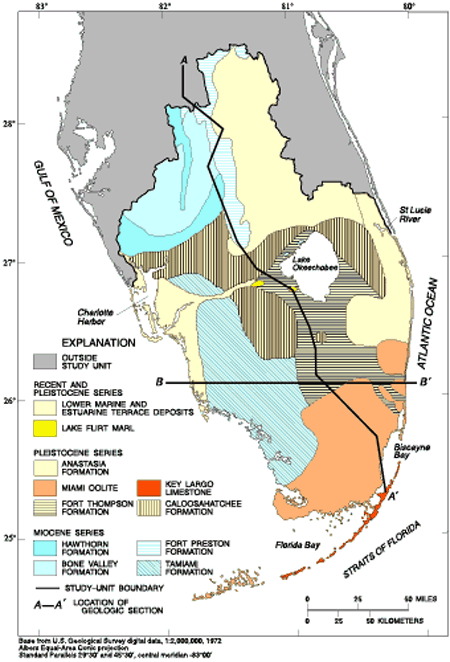
Miami Limestone (formerly Miami Oolite, orange on map) in relation to other formations in South Florida.

The Miami Limestone, originally called Miami Oolite, is a geologic formation of limestone in southeastern Florida.

Miami Limestone forms the Atlantic Coastal Ridge in southeastern Florida, near the coast in Palm Beach, Broward and Miami Dade counties. It also lies under the eastern (Miami-Dade County) part of the Everglades, Florida Bay, and the lower Florida Keys from Big Pine Key to the Marquesas Keys, forming the Miami Rock Ridge. Mitchell-Tapping also states that a component of the Miami Limestone extends under the Gulf of Mexico north to a point 112 kilometers west of Tampa.

The part of the Miami Limestone forming the Atlantic Coastal Ridge and the lower Florida Keys is an oolitic grainstone which includes fossils of corals, echinoids, mollusks, and algae. The oolitic formation in the lower Florida Keys has less quartz sand and fewer fossils than does the oolitic formation on the mainland. Based on those differences, Mitchel-Tapping divided the Miami Limestone into the Fort Dallas Oolite on the mainland and under most of Florida Bay, and the Key West Oolite, under the southernmost corner of Florida Bay within the Everglades park boundaries, along the west side of the middle Florida Keys, and in the lower Keys, including the Marquesas Keys to near the Dry Tortugas. The Fort Dallas Oolite, white to yellow in color, is soft but hardens on exposure to air or water. Quartz sand grains occur throughout the Fort Dallas Oolite. The ooids have generally formed on a nucleus of calcite crystals, and occasionally on shell fragments and quartz grains, and are covered with up to five layers of calcite. Fort Dallas ooids have a defined layer of calcite around the nucleus. The Key West Oolite is mostly white, includes very little quartz sand, does not harden on exposure to air or water, and its ooids do not have a calcite mosaic around the nucleus. Uranium-thorium dating indicates that the ooids in the Fort Dallas and Key West units formed at the same time. The fossils in the formation underlying the Everglades, which does not include any ooids, consists primarily of a single bryozoan species, Schizoporella floridana.

The Miami Limestone was deposited during the Sangamon interglacial, when southern Florida was under a shallow sea. Falling sea levels during the Wisconsin glaciation exposed the formation to air and rain, and rainwater percolating through the deposits replaced aragonite with calcite and formed an indurated rock.

The Miami Limestone is underlain by the Anastasia Formation in eastern Broward and extreme southeastern Palm Beach counties, by the Fort Thompson Formation in southeastern Palm Beach County, central Broward County, all of Miami-Dade County, and Florida Bay, by the Tamiami Formation in Collier and mainland Monroe counties, and by the Key Largo Limestone in the lower Florida Keys.

== See also ==
- List of fossiliferous stratigraphic units in Florida
