= Buckingham Limestone =

Geologic member of the Tamiami Formation in Florida, United States

- Stratigraphic range: 4.2-3.1 Ma
- Type: Member
- Unit of: Tamiami Formation
- Underlies: Ochopee Limestone
- Overlies: Murdock Station Formation

Lithology
- Primary: Limestone, Marl
- Other: Phosphate

Location
- Region: Florida
- Country: United States

The Buckingham Limestone is the earliest geologic member of the Tamiami Formation, a large lagerstätte in Florida. It preserves fossils dating back to the Piacenzian.

== See also ==
- Tamiami Formation
- List of fossiliferous stratigraphic units in Florida
