= Ocala Group =

Geological group in Florida

- Stratigraphic range: Paleogene
- Type: Group

Location
- Region: Florida
- Country: United States

The Ocala Group is a geologic group in Florida. It preserves fossils dating back to the Paleogene period.

== See also ==
- List of fossiliferous stratigraphic units in Florida
