= Crystal River Formation =

Geologic formation in Florida, United States

Crystal River Limestone
- Stratigraphic range: Priabonian
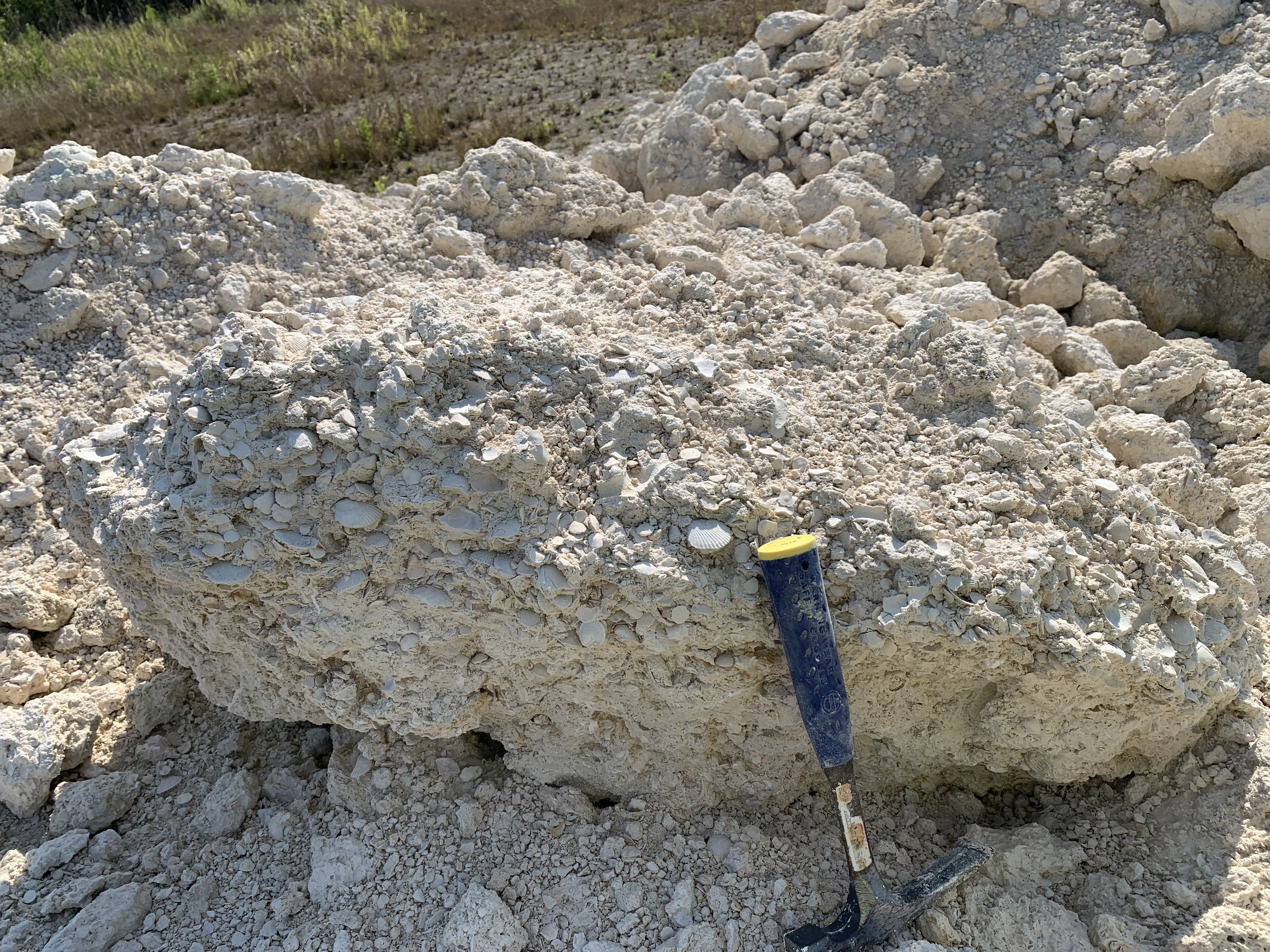
- The Crystal River Formation
- Type: Formation
- Underlies: Suwannee Limestone
- Overlies: Williston Formation

Lithology
- Primary: Limestone

Location
- Region: Florida
- Country: United States

The Crystal River Formation is a geologic formation in Florida. It preserves fossils dating back to the Priabonian age.

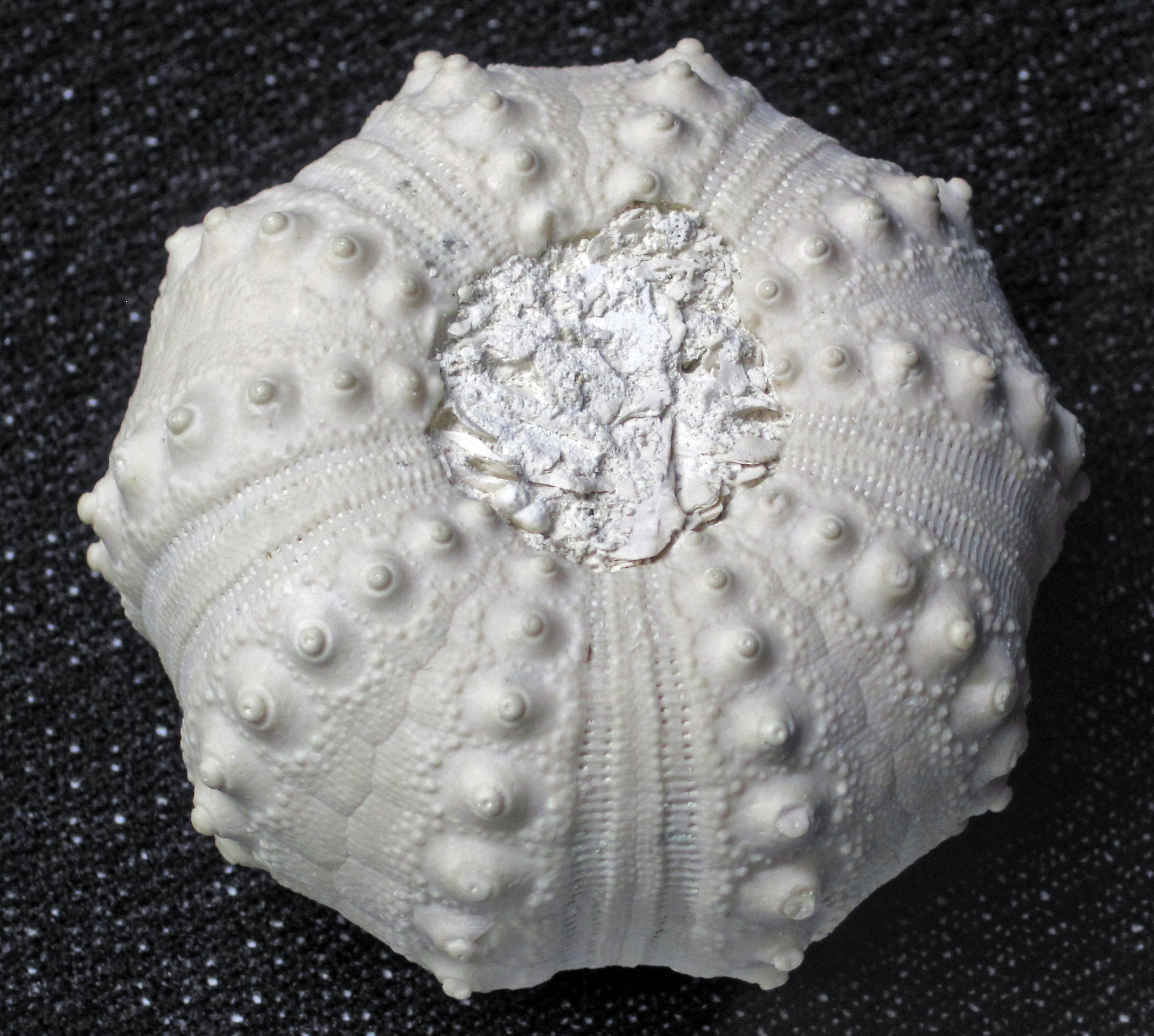
A sea urchin from the Crystal River Formation

== See also ==
- List of fossiliferous stratigraphic units in Florida
