= Vexillum willcoxi =

Scientific classification
- Kingdom: Animalia
- Phylum: Mollusca
- Class: Gastropoda
- Subclass: Caenogastropoda
- Order: Neogastropoda
- Superfamily: Turbinelloidea
- Family: Costellariidae
- Genus: Vexillum
- Species: †V. willcoxi

Binomial name
- †Vexillum willcoxi (W. H. Dall, 1890)

Synonyms
- Mitra willcoxi Dall, 1890; Vexillum (Uromitra) willcoxi (Dall, 1890)

Species of gastropod

Vexillum willcoxi is an extinct species of sea snail, a marine gastropod mollusk, in the family Costellariidae, the ribbed miters.

== Description ==
The length of the shell attains 8 mm.

== Distribution ==
Fossils of this marine species were found in Pleistocene strata in the Nashua Formation, Florida.
