= List of fossiliferous stratigraphic units in Florida =

List of fossil bearing rock units in Florida

Group	Formation	Members	Period	Notes
Alum Bluff Group	Chipola Formation		Neogene	
Alum Bluff Group	Fort Preston Sand		Neogene	
Alum Bluff Group	Jackson Bluff Formation		Neogene	
Alum Bluff Group	Oak Grove Formation		Neogene	
Alum Bluff Group	Shoal River Formation		Neogene	
	Bridgeboro Limestone		Paleogene	
Claiborn Group	Avon Park Formation		Paleogene	
Claiborn Group	Oldsmar Formation			
Hawthorn Group	Alachua Formation		Neogene	
Hawthorn Group	Arcadia Formation		Paleogene	
Hawthorn Group	Murdock Station Formation		Neogene	
Hawthorn Group	Peace River Formation		Neogene	
Hawthorn Group	Torreya Formation		Neogene	
Ocala Limestone	Crystal River Formation		Paleogene	
	Duplin Formation		Neogene	
Okeechobee Group	Anastasia Formation		Late Pleistocene	
Okeechobee Group	Bermont Formation		Neogene	
Okeechobee Group	Coffee Mill Hammock Formation		Late Pleistocene	
Okeechobee Group	Cypresshead Formation		Neogene	
Okeechobee Group	Fort Thompson Formation		Neogene	
Okeechobee Group	Satilla Formation		Late Pleistocene	
Okeechobee Group	Key Largo Limestone		Pleistocene	
Okeechobee Group	Miami Oolite		Pleistocene	
Okeechobee Group	Nashua Formation		Early Pleistocene	
Okeechobee Group	Tamiami Formation	Buckingham Limestone	Zanclean	
Okeechobee Group	Tamiami Formation	Ochopee Limestone		
Okeechobee Group	Tamiami Formation	Pinecrest Beds		
	Bumpnose Formation		Paleogene	
	Parachucla Formation		Neogene	
	Bayshore Formation		Neogene	
	Chattahoochee Formation		Neogene	
	Coosawhatchie Formation		Neogene	
	Parachucla Formation		Paleogene	
	Marks Head Formation		Neogene	
	Inglis Formation		Paleogene	
	Moodys Branch Formation		Paleogene	
Vicksburg Group	Marianna Limestone		Paleogene	
Vicksburg Group	Suwannee Limestone		Paleogene	
	Williston Formation		Paleogene	
	Penney Farms Formation		early Miocene	
	Red Bay Formation		Neogene	
	Statenville Formation		Neogene	
	Bone Valley Formation		Neogene	
	Wicomico Formation		Neogene	

== See also ==
- Paleontology in Florida
