= Bridgeboro =

Bridgeboro may refer to:

- Bridgeboro, Georgia, an unincorporated community
- Bridgeboro, New Jersey, an unincorporated community
- Bridgeboro Limestone, a geologic formation
