= Nashua Formation =

Early Pleistocene formation in Florida

- Stratigraphic range: early Pleistocene
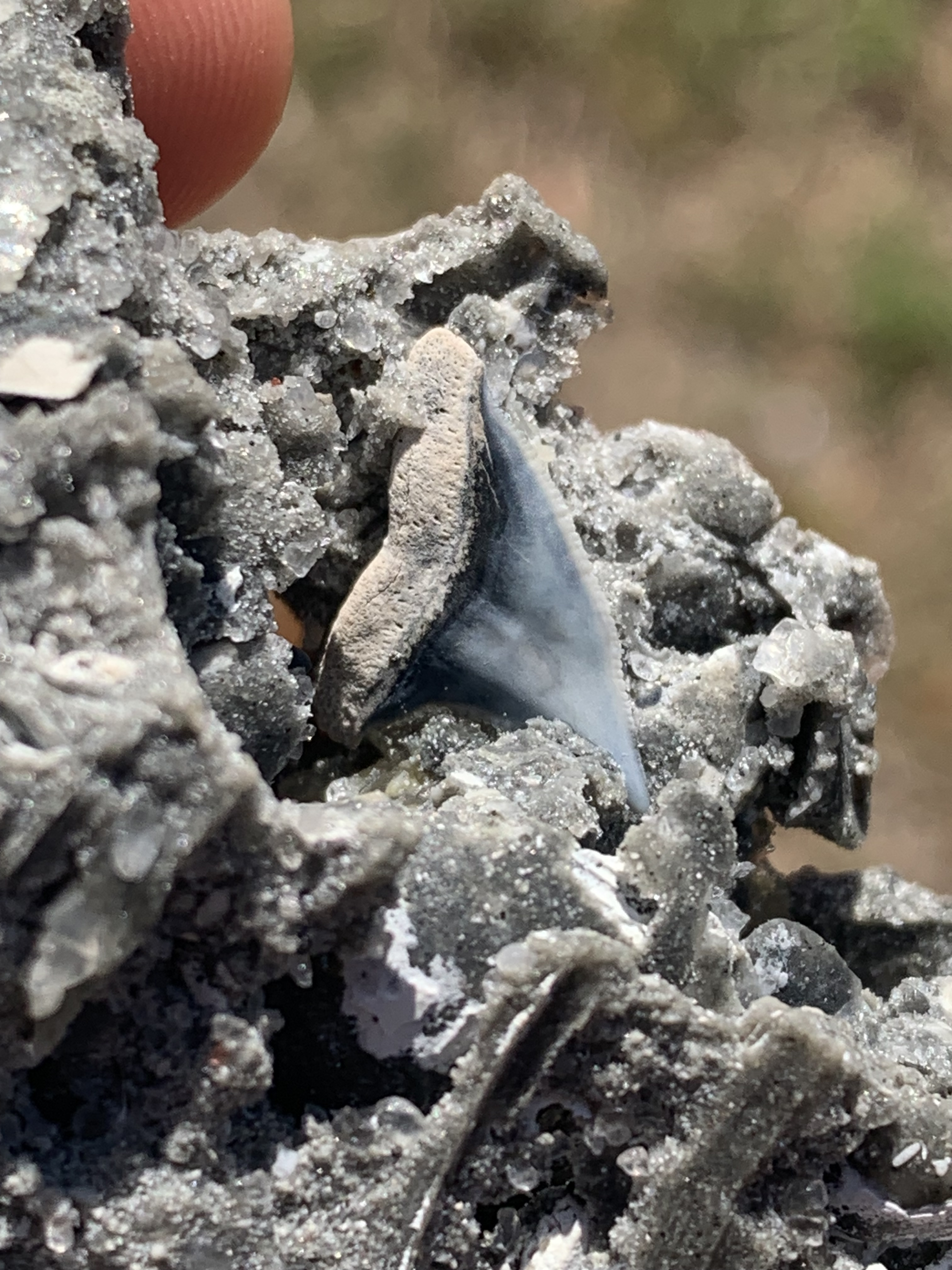
- A shark tooth embedded in the Ft. Drum Member of the Nashua Formation, Pleistocene
- Type: Formation
- Underlies: Bermont Formation
- Overlies: Tamiami Formation

Lithology
- Primary: Quartz sand, Clay
- Other: Calcite, Phosphorite

Location
- Region: Eastern Florida
- Country: United States

Type section
- Named for: Nashua on St. Johns River

The Nashua Formation is an early Pleistocene geologic formation in Florida. The fine to coarse quartz sands, fossiliferous quartz sands, and dark clays contain wood and brackish-water fossils.

It is a nearshore marine formation that occurs in a band 40 to 70 km wide along the Atlantic Coast of Florida.

== Background ==
This is described as variably calcareous, shelly sand, and finely sandy shell coquina.

Deposited in open-marine, shallow-water on an inner neritic continental shelf. Underlies the St. Johns River area at least as far south as Deland, Volusia County.

== Location ==
The formation's northern limit is in the vicinity of the St. Marys River and so it probably also occurs in Georgia. It grades westward and northward into the Cypresshead Formation.

The area overlies the Coosawhatchie Formation and underlies only undifferentiated surficial sand deposits in northeast Florida.

In the coastal area, it may be overlain by the Satilla Formation. The formation was measured in a well at Deland at 32 ft (10 m). The formation is probably a multi deposit formation.

== Age ==
On the basis of foraminifera found, the unit was assigned an age range of late Pliocene to early Pleistocene.

== Organisms ==
Barnacles, bryozoans, coral, crab claws, sand dollars and sea urchin spines have been found in this formation.

== See also ==
- List of fossiliferous stratigraphic units in Florida
