= Inglis Formation =

Geologic formation in Florida, United States

- Stratigraphic range: Paleogene
- Type: Formation

Location
- Region: Florida
- Country: United States

The Inglis Formation is a geologic formation in Florida. It preserves fossils dating back to the Paleogene period.

== See also ==
- List of fossiliferous stratigraphic units in Florida
