= Conus miamiensis =

Conus miamiensis Temporal range: Pliocene-Pleistocene

Conservation status
- Extinct (IUCN 3.1)

Scientific classification
- Kingdom: Animalia
- Phylum: Mollusca
- Class: Gastropoda
- Subclass: Caenogastropoda
- Order: Neogastropoda
- Superfamily: Conoidea
- Family: Conidae
- Genus: Conus
- Species: †C. miamiensis

Binomial name
- †Conus miamiensis Petuch, 1986

Synonyms
- † Conus (Virgiconus) miamiensis Petuch, 1986 accepted, alternate representation; † Conus marylandicus Petuch, 1986

Species of sea snail

Conus miamiensis is an extinct species of sea snail, a marine gastropod mollusk in the family Conidae, the cone snails, cone shells or cones. The species is endemic to southern Florida.

This species is the type taxon of the fossil genus † Tequestaconus Petuch & Drolshagen, 2015

== Description ==
The shell attains a length of 32 mm.

== Distribution ==
This fossil species is known from the Plio-Pleistocene of Florida.
