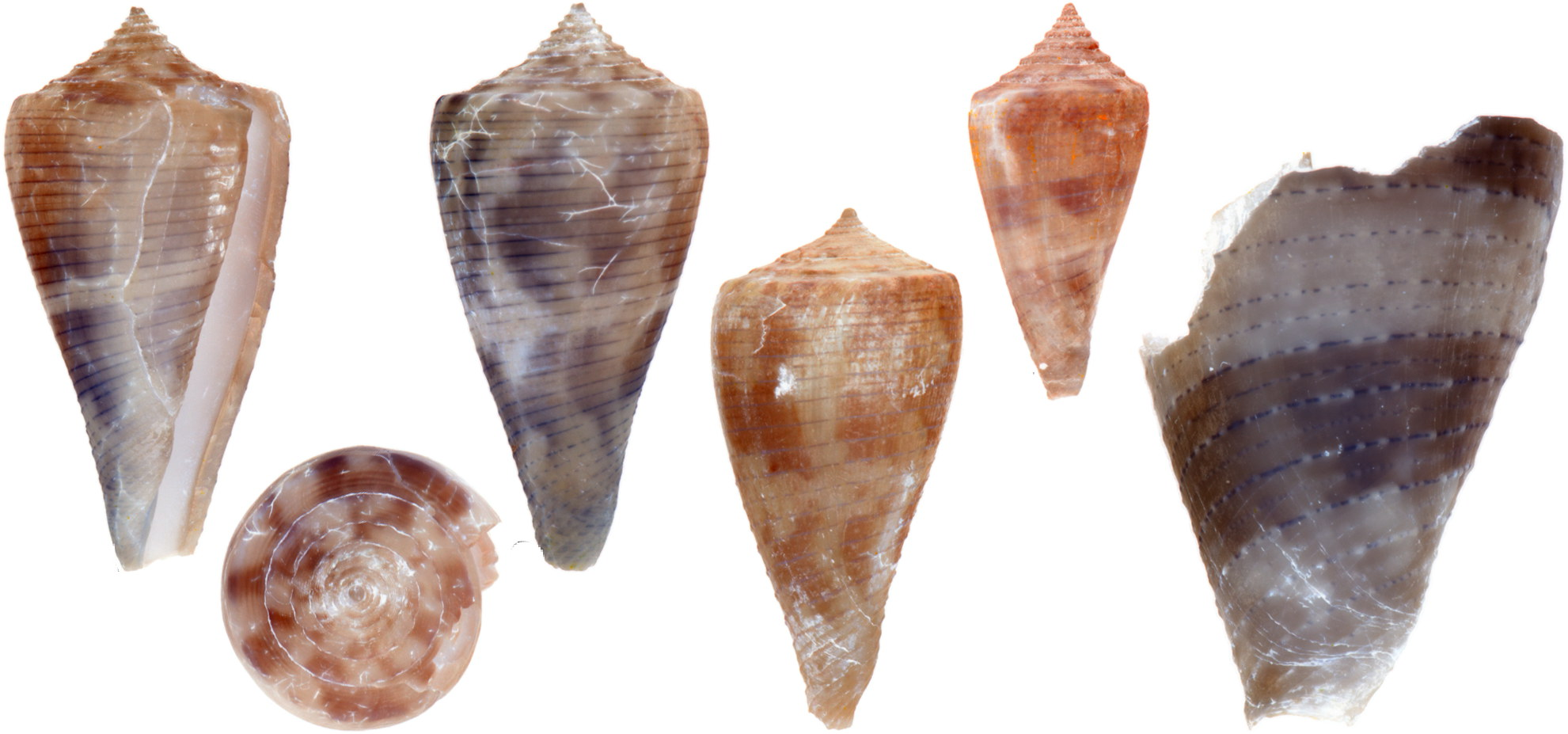
- Several views of a shell of Conus haytensis - All are reversed images of specimens photographed under UV light

Scientific classification
- Kingdom: Animalia
- Phylum: Mollusca
- Class: Gastropoda
- Subclass: Caenogastropoda
- Order: Neogastropoda
- Superfamily: Conoidea
- Family: Conidae
- Genus: Conus
- Species: C. haytensis

Binomial name
- Conus haytensis G. B. Sowerby I, 1850

Synonyms
- † Conus (Dendroconus) haytensis Sowerby I, 1850; † Conus (Pyruconus) haytensis G. B. Sowerby I, 1850· accepted, alternate representation

= Conus haytensis =

Conus haytensis Temporal range: Neogene

Species of sea snail

Conus haytensis is a fossil species of sea snail, a marine gastropod mollusk in the family Conidae, the cone snails, cone shells or cones.

== Description ==
The size of the shell varies between 21 mm and 36 mm.

== Distribution ==
This marine species is only known in the fossil state and was found in the Neogene of the Dominican Republic.
