= Jackson Bluff Formation =

Geologic formation in Florida

- Stratigraphic range: Neogene
- Type: Formation

Location
- Region: Florida
- Country: United States

The Jackson Bluff Formation is a geologic formation in Florida. It preserves fossils dating back to the Neogene period.

== See also ==
- List of fossiliferous stratigraphic units in Florida
