= Bayshore Formation =

Geologic Formation or member in Florida, United States

- Stratigraphic range: Messinian
- Type: Formation(?)
- Unit of: Tamiami Formation(?), Hawthorn Group

Location
- Region: Florida
- Country: United States

Type section
- Named for: Bayshore Canal

The Bayshore Formation is a geologic formation or member in Florida. It preserves fossils dating back to the Messinian.

== See also ==
- List of fossiliferous stratigraphic units in Florida
