= Bridgeboro Limestone =

- Stratigraphic range: Early Oligocene; ~33–29 Ma
- Type: Formation

Lithology
- Primary: Limestone
- Other: Sandstone

Location
- Coordinates: 31.4°N 84.0°W
- Approximate paleocoordinates: 31.5°N 77.5°W
- Region: Georgia, Florida
- Country: United States

Type section
- Named for: Bridgeboro Quarry
- Bridgeboro Limestone (the United States) Bridgeboro Limestone (Georgia)

The Bridgeboro Limestone is a geologic formation in Georgia and Florida. The limestones and sandstones of the formation preserve fossils dating back to the Early Oligocene of the Paleogene period.

== See also ==
- List of fossiliferous stratigraphic units in Georgia (U.S. state)
- List of fossiliferous stratigraphic units in Florida
- Paleontology in Georgia (U.S. state)
- Paleontology in Florida
