= Pinecrest Beds =

Konzentrat Lagerstätte in Florida, United States

- Stratigraphic range: Pliocene
- Type: Member

Location
- Region: Florida
- Country: United States

The Pinecrest Beds are a biodiverse konzentrat-lagerstätte and geologic member of the Tamiami Formation in Florida. It preserves mostly molluscan fossils of the Pliocene.

== See also ==
- List of fossiliferous stratigraphic units in Florida
