= Caloosahatchee Formation =

Geologic formation in Florida

- Stratigraphic range: Pleistocene
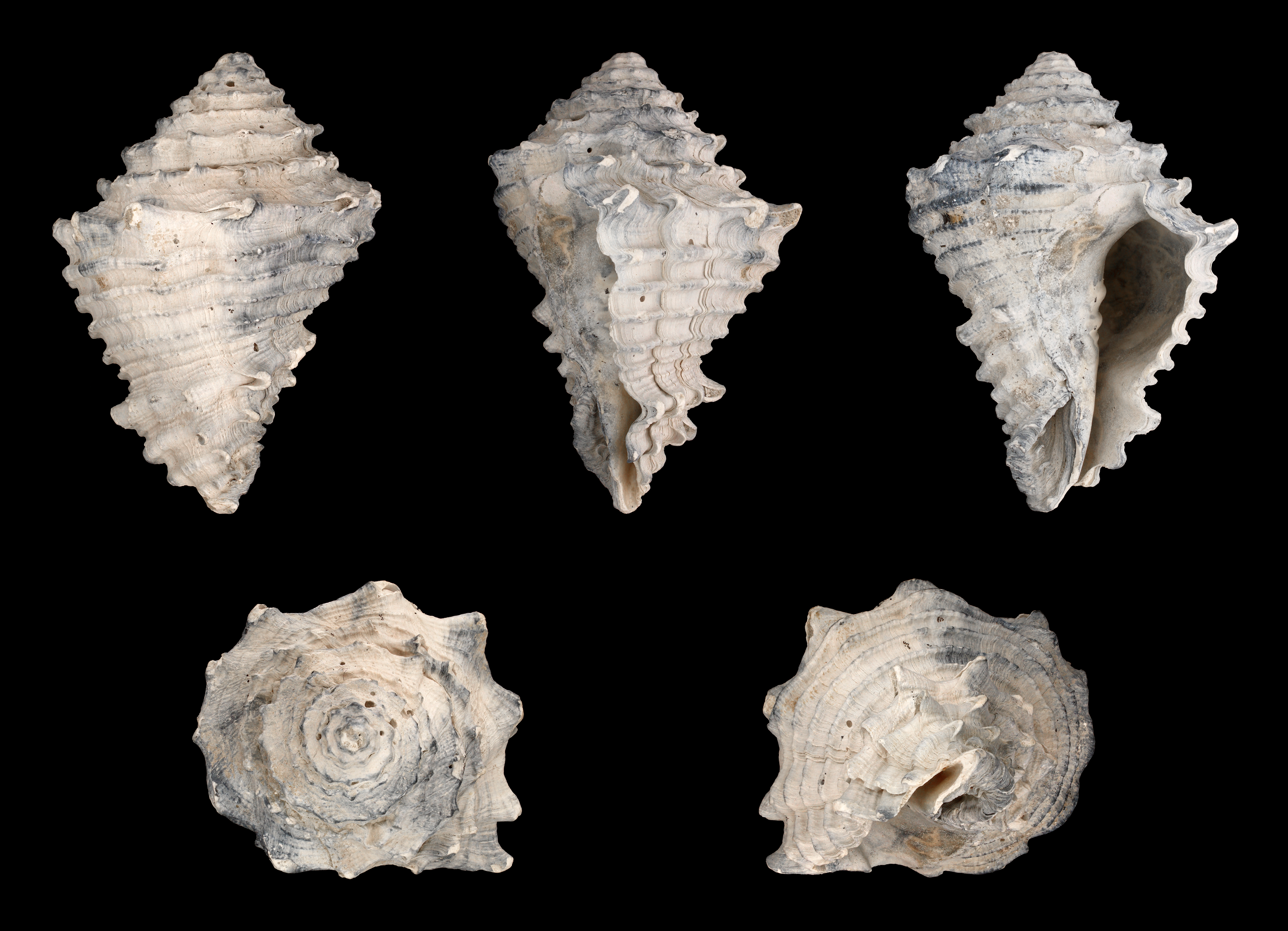
- Fossils from the Caloosahatchee Formation
- Type: Formation
- Underlies: Bermont Formation
- Overlies: Tamiami Formation

Lithology
- Primary: Limestone, sand
- Other: phosphate

Location
- Region: Florida
- Country: United States

Type section
- Named for: Caloosahatchee River

The Caloosahatchee Formation is a geologic formation in Florida. It preserves fossils dating back to the Pleistocene.

== See also ==
- List of fossiliferous stratigraphic units in Florida
