= Key Largo Limestone =

Geologic formation in Florida

- Type: Formation

Location
- Region: Florida
- Country: United States

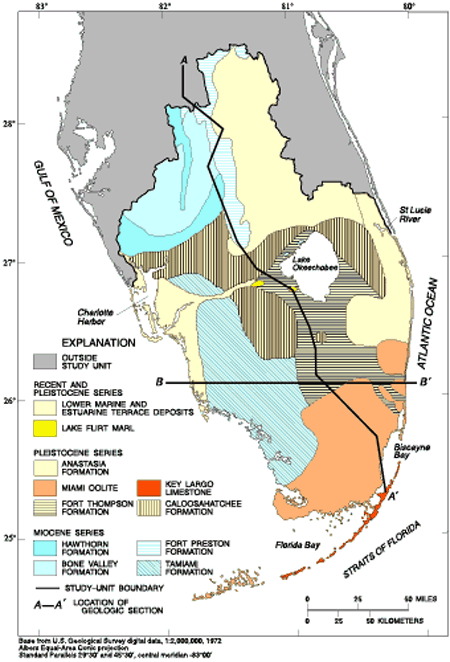
Key Largo Limestone in relation to other surface formations in South Florida.

The Key Largo Limestone is a geologic formation in Florida. It is a fossilized coral reef. The formation is exposed along the upper and middle Florida Keys from Soldier Key (at the north end of the Florida Keys) to the Bahia Honda Channel (at the west end of Bahia Honda Key). The islands form a long narrow arc concentric with the inner edge of the Florida Straits and with the Florida Reef. The limestone includes fossils of corals, mollusks and bryozoans. Fossilized coral head formations are visible in some exposures. The Key Largo Limestone continues in a narrow band underwater just offshore of the coast of Florida north of Soldier Key to the middle of the Palm Beach County coast, and southward just offshore of the lower Florida Keys to the Dry Tortugas.

== See also ==
- List of fossiliferous stratigraphic units in Florida
