= Bermont Formation =

Fossiliferous geologic formation in South Florida

- Stratigraphic range: Middle Pleistocene
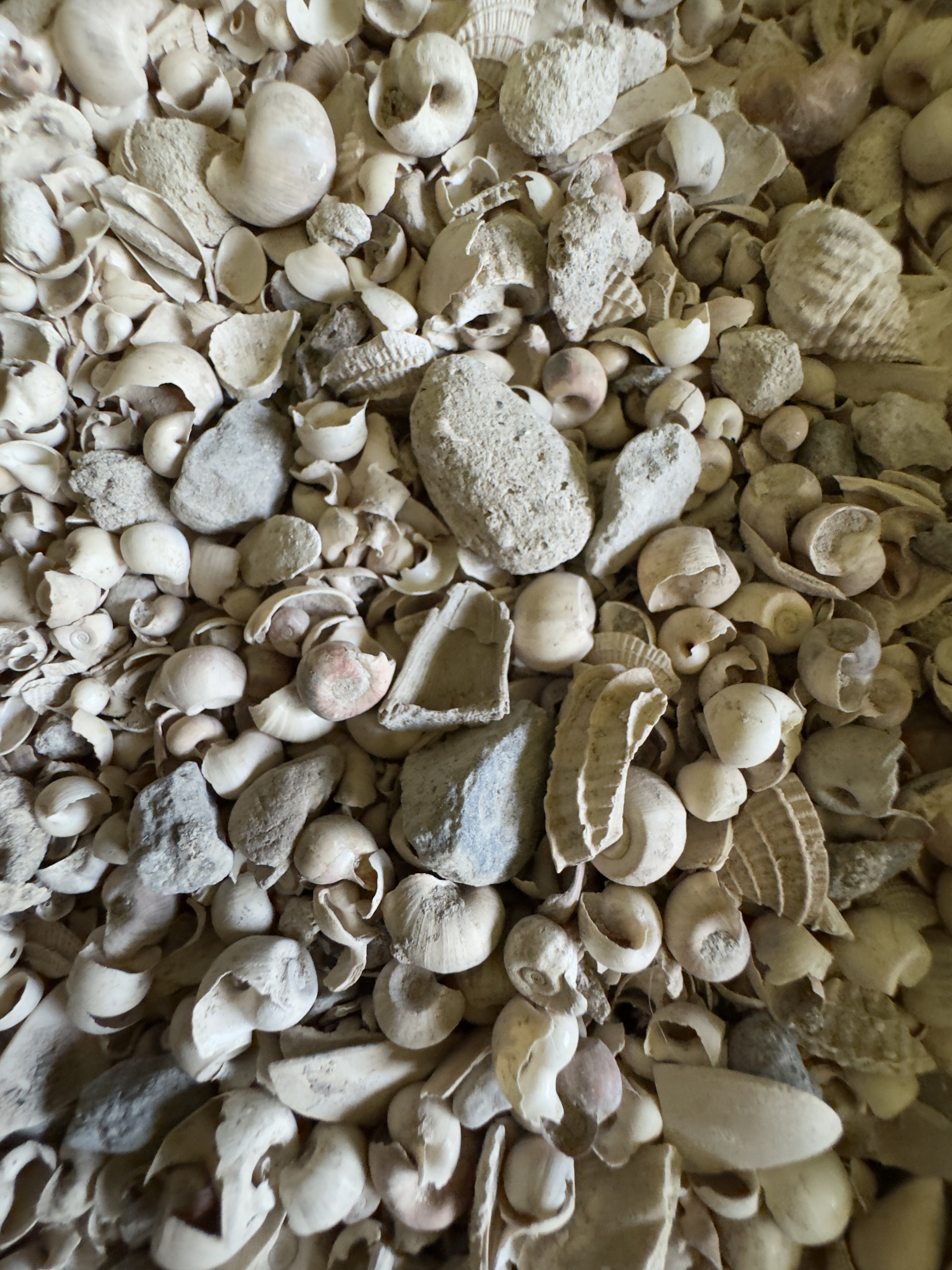
- Bermont formation, paleolake Okeelanta deposits
- Type: Formation
- Sub-units: Belle Glade, Okeelanta, and Holey Land
- Underlies: Fort Thompson Formation
- Overlies: Caloosahatchee Formation
- Thickness: 0.6 - 9.0 meters

Lithology
- Primary: limestone, sand
- Other: phosphate

Location
- Region: Florida
- Country: United States

The Bermont Formation is a geologic formation in Florida. It preserves mostly invertebrate fossils that date back to the Middle Pleistocene. Most of the fossils preserved are extant mollusk shells. It is mined commercially along with similar formations, to produce shell fill for construction.

A lot of our information on the Bermont Formation comes from commercial mining operations. Due to the nature of Florida's flat landscape, paleontologists rely on commercial interest in mining to gain access to otherwise inaccessible specimens for study. Such is the case with the Bermont Formation's bone bed in the Leisey shell pit.

As is the case with some other formations, UV can sometimes be used to bring out hidden pigmentation in some fossil shells. This is especially useful in telling the difference between some species, which would otherwise be indistinguishable.

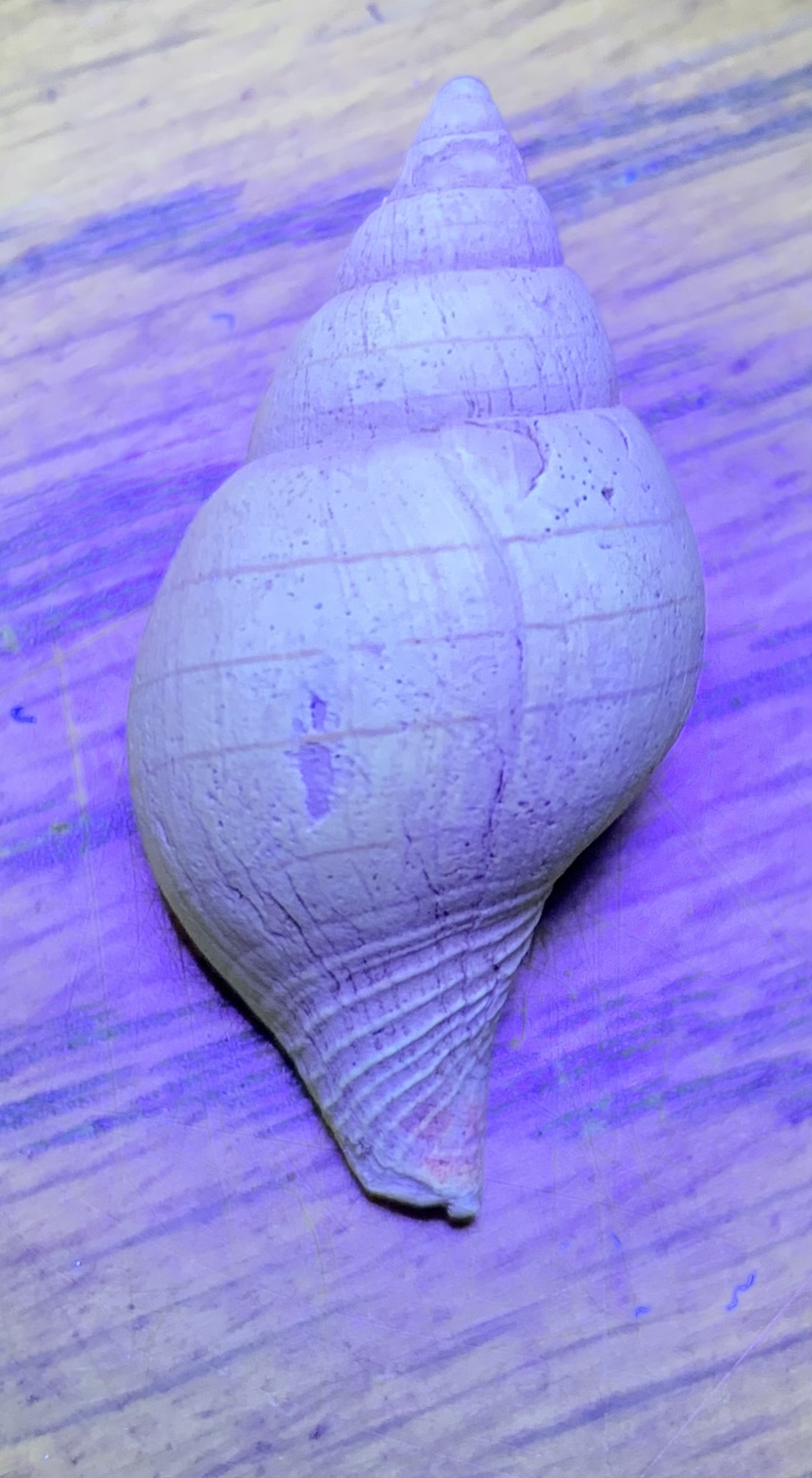
A fossil banded tulip (Cinctura lilium) from the Bermont Formation under a UV flashlight

== Environment of Deposition ==
The original environment of the deposits has been interpreted as being that of a shallow coastal marine reef, to open brackish waters, with a maximum depth of less than 15 meters. Currently, it is estimated that 10 - 20% of its mollusk species are extinct.

== Index Taxa ==
Index taxa in the Bermont formation currently include Strombus mayacensis, Vasum floridanum, Fusinus watermani, Fasciolaria okeechobeensis, and Miltha carmenae.

== See also ==
- List of fossiliferous stratigraphic units in Florida
