= Murdock Station Formation =

Murdock Station
- Stratigraphic range: Neogene
- Type: Formation
- Unit of: Tamiami Formation(?)

Location
- Region: Florida
- Country: United States

Type section
- Named for: Murdock Station

The Murdock Station Formation is a geologic formation or member in Florida. It preserves fossils dating back to the Zanclean Pliocene.

== See also ==
- List of fossiliferous stratigraphic units in Florida
