= Satilla Formation =

Geologic formation in Georgia, United States

- Type: Formation

Location
- Region: Georgia
- Country: United States

The Satilla Formation is a geologic formation in Georgia, United States. It preserves fossils.

== See also ==
- List of fossiliferous stratigraphic units in Georgia (U.S. state)
- Paleontology in Georgia (U.S. state)
