= Okeechobee Group =

Geologic group in Florida, United States

- Stratigraphic range: Neogene
- Type: Group

Location
- Region: Florida
- Country: United States

The Okeechobee Group is a geologic group in Florida. The group preserves fossils dating back to the Neogene period. This group of formations in the Everglades were deposited when high tropical water started to return in the Late Zanclean Period.

== See also ==
- List of fossiliferous stratigraphic units in Florida
