= Oak Grove Formation =

Geologic formation in Georgia

- Stratigraphic range: Neogene
- Type: Formation

Location
- Region: Georgia
- Country: United States

The Oak Grove Formation is a geologic formation in Georgia. It preserves fossils dating back to the Neogene period.

== See also ==
- List of fossiliferous stratigraphic units in Georgia (U.S. state)
- Paleontology in Georgia (U.S. state)
