= Tamiami Formation =

Pliocene Lagerstätte in Southern Florida

- Stratigraphic range: Zanclean-Piacenzian; ~4.6–2.7 Ma In the broad sense extends from the Messinian until Gelasian
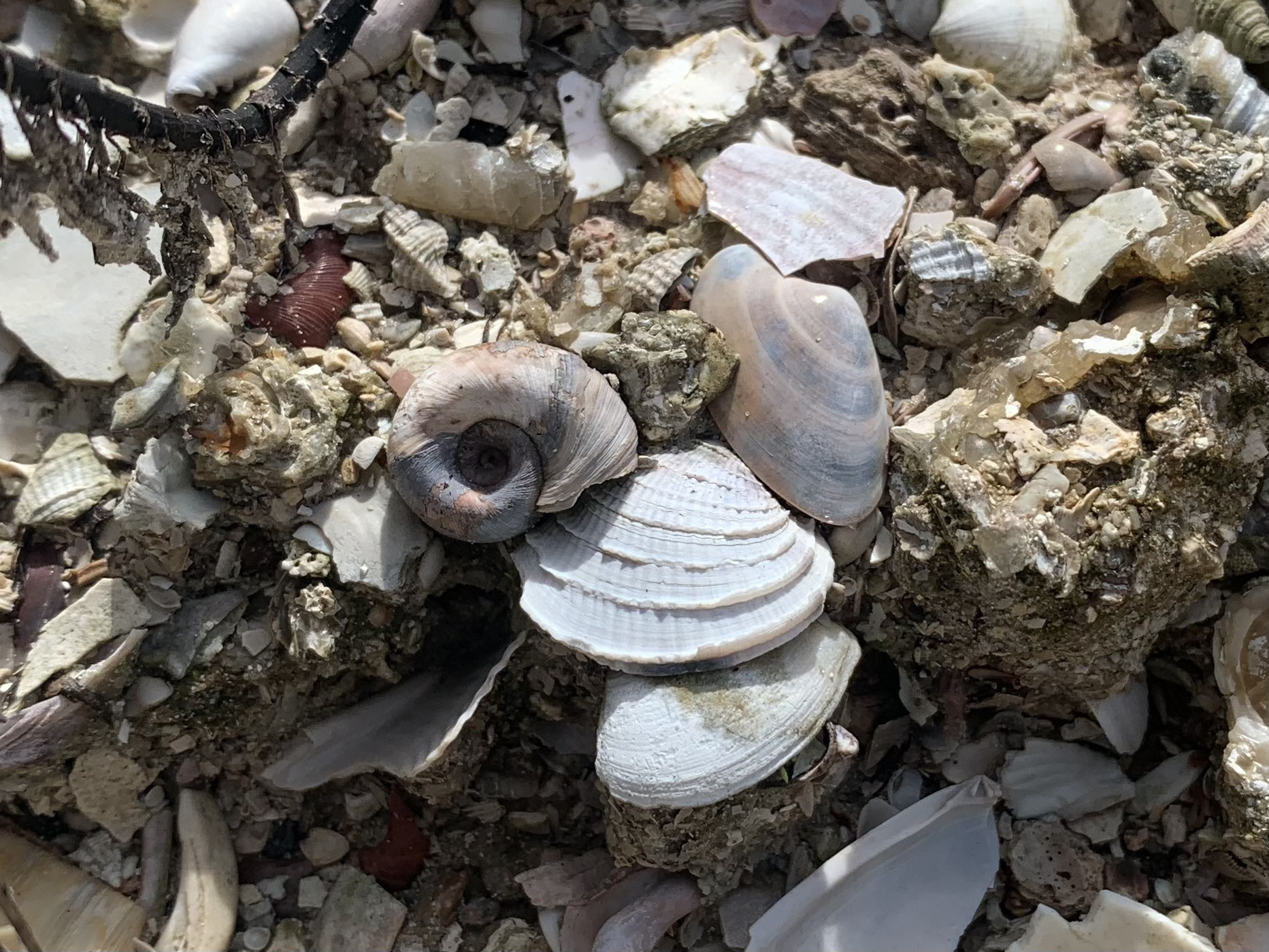
- The Tamiami Formation of Hillsborough County
- Type: Geological formation
- Unit of: Okeechobee group
- Sub-units: (See Text)
- Underlies: Caloosahatchee Formation, Nashua Formation
- Overlies: Hawthorn Group (see text)
- Area: South Florida
- Thickness: 8.2–196.9 ft (2.5–60.0 m)

Lithology
- Primary: Marl, Sandstone, Claystone, Limestone
- Other: Phosphate, Pyrite, Calcite, rare tektites

Location
- Region: South Florida
- Country: United States
- Extent: ~ 17,633.9 miles (28,379.0 km)

Type section
- Named for: Tamiami Trail and Tamiami Canal (US Highway 41)
- Named by: Wendell Clay Mansfield
- Year defined: 1939
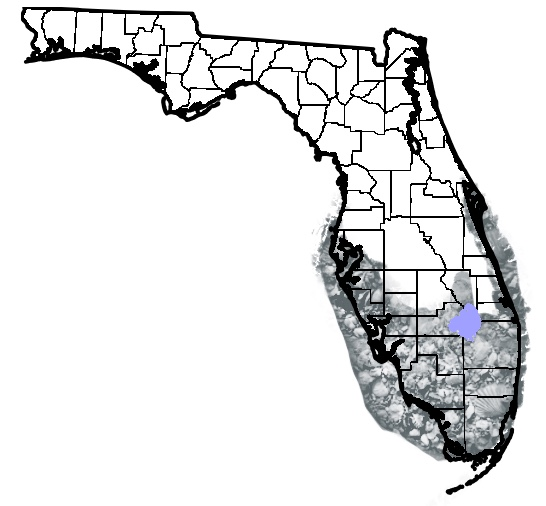
- Approximate total extent of the Tamiami Formation

The Tamiami Formation (IPA: /ˈt̺ʰæˌmi.ɑːmiː fɔɹˈmeɪʃ(ə)n/) is a Pliocene Konzentrat-Lagerstätte in Southern Florida. The nature of units in the Tamiami Formation is debated, and it has at one point been described by DuBar as a geologic group. As originally defined, the Murdock Station and Bayshore Formations were members of the Tamiami Formation. In the broadest sense (or sensu latissimo, abbreviated here as s.l.) the Tamiami Formation includes the Murdock Station and Bayshore members.

The Tamiami Formation is one of the most biodiverse fossil bearing formations on Earth.

== Etymology ==
The Tamiami Formation derives its name from the southern most stretch of US Highway 41, (the Tamiami Trail) where the formation was first studied in depth. The name of the Tamiami Trail in itself is a portmanteau of the major cities it runs between, Tampa and Miami.

Tampa is named after the Calusa settlement Tanpa, which was actually located around Charlotte Harbor. Miami comes from Mayaimi, the Calusa word for Lake Okeechobee, the last remnant of the Okeechobean Sea preserved within the formation. Mayaimi is further split into Mayai and -mi. Julian Granberry further reconstructs Proto-Tunica forms “*may...” and “*-mi”, with the root meanings glossed as “On the other side” and “Over (there)”

== Discovery and history of study ==
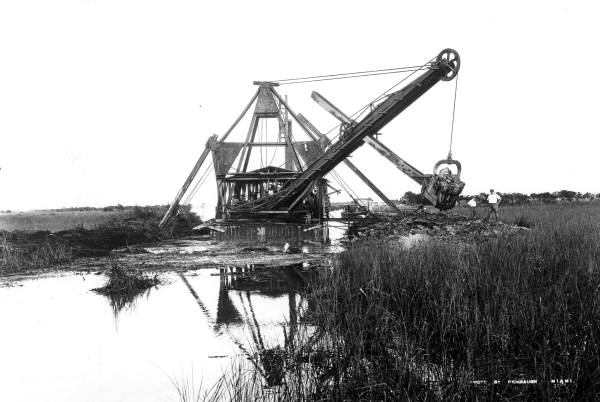
Dredge at work on the construction of the Tamiami Trail

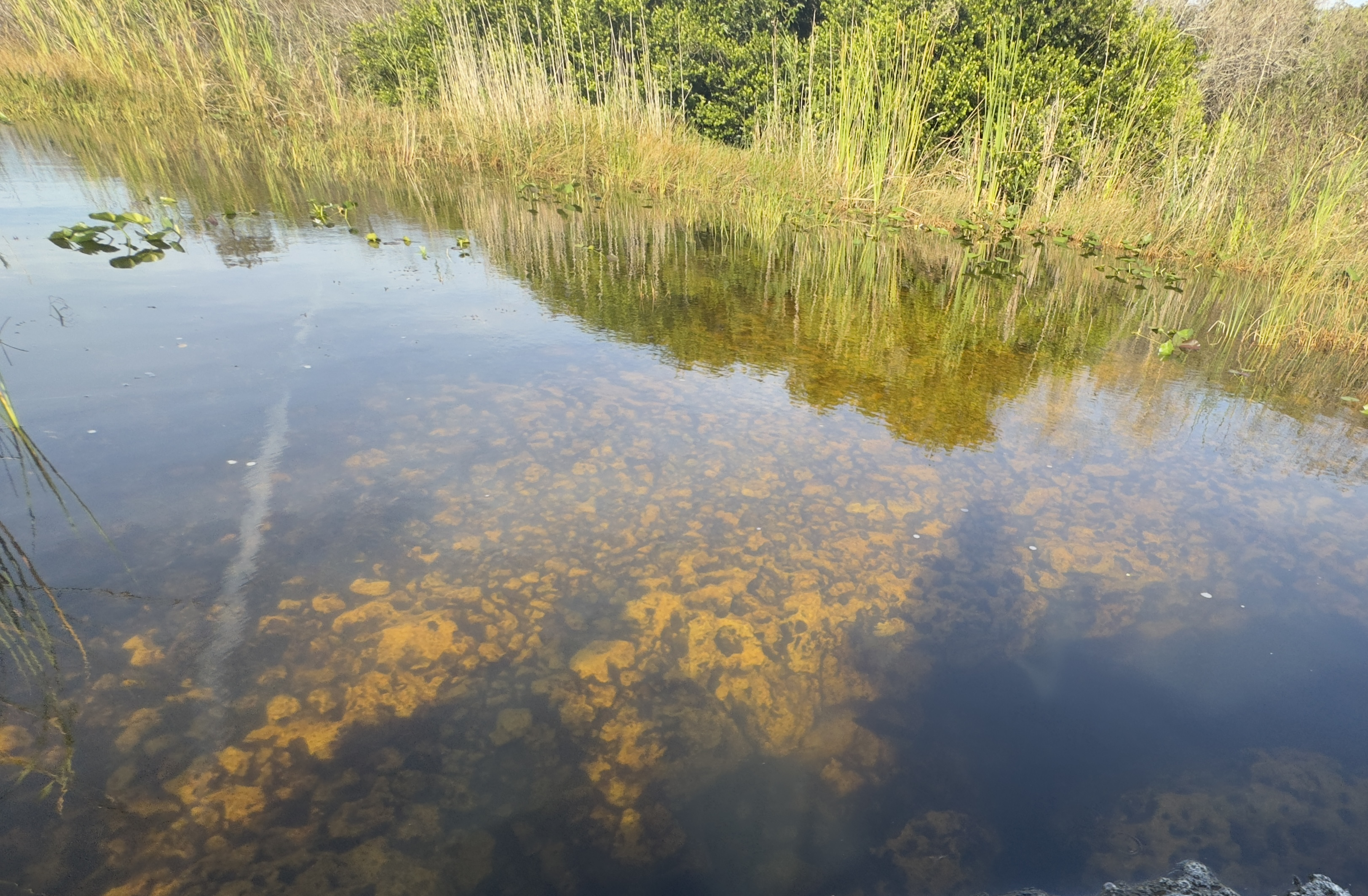
Exposure of the Tamiami Formation in the Tamiami Canal of the Miccosukee Reserved Area.

Prior to the arrival of Europeans, fossils of the Tamiami Formation were exploited by the indigenous people of Florida. Shark teeth from the coast were modified into necklaces and were occasionally fashioned into spears. These teeth are present at known early contact sites. The groups at the time of contact included those of the settlements of Uzita, Mocozo, and Tocobaga; as well as the Calusa, Tequesta and Mayaimi. These teeth were recognized as fossil shark teeth by these indigenous groups. They were preferred for spiritual over utilitarian use. Fossils from the formation may be found as far away as Ohio. Limestones from the Tamiami Formation were used in healing and are found in pre-Columbian burials. Spanish colonists had also noticed the fossil teeth, but mistook them for those of crocodiles.

The construction of the Tamiami Trail began in 1919 where Seminole and Miccosukee people (The descendants of Hitchiti refugees and the previously mentioned indigenous people) guided a trail through the Everglades. Here the inhabitants of the Everglades encountered fossil corals.

Helen Tucker and Druid Wilson published their first description of the Acline Fauna in 1932 in the shell pits of Punta Gorda.

The Tamiami Formation was first formally described along the Tamiami Trail by Wendell Clay Mansfield, in a work that was published posthumously. Mansfield originally called it the “Tamiami Limestone”. The construction of the Tamiami Trail required a canal, which made the study of the formation (with few natural outcrops) more accessible to researchers.

Timothy Abbott Conrad and William Healey Dall were amongst the first researchers to describe taxa from the formation, Mansfield himself being a student of Dall. Both were important pioneer paleomalacologists, and Conrad described local outcrops before Mansfield's formal description.

Julia Anna Gardner, a friend of Mansfield, was amongst the first researchers to describe the paleomalacologic fauna of the Tamiami formation. Today the Paleontological Research Institute in New York houses many of her specimens, although many of her species still remain unassessed.

Axel Olsson first published his description of the Pinecrest Beds in 1964, defining the unit bearing the Acline Fauna.

In the 1980s, various vertebrate sites were found within the Tamiami Formation. The bird layer of the Pinecrest Beds was first discovered at this time, with a death assemblage of cormorants.

The Escalation Hypothesis was developed by the blind Dutch scientist Geerat J. Vermeij's in part due to his observations of gastropod evolution in the Pinecrest Beds.

The Paleomalacologist and Paleoceanographer Edward Petuch is one of the most prolific authors on the Tamiami Formation. Petuch's units of the Pinecrest and Golden Gate members are widely used in publications. Petuch is himself however a controversial figure amongst researchers, criticized as a prolific “splitter”. Nonetheless, as of 2026 many of his species are still upheld as valid.

As of 2026, many aspects of the Tamiami Formation remain understudied. Geological descriptions of the formation are lacking. Micromollusks of the Pinecrest Beds have complicated the already high estimates of biodiversity. Some estimates have additionally placed the Buckingham, Golden Gate, and Ochopee members as having similar rates of endemism to the Acline Fauna of the Pinecrest Beds. Stratigraphic descriptions of many sites (especially outside of Sarasota) are scarce, and many members of the formation are unnamed.

== Age ==
Period: Neogene
Epoch: Latest Miocene to Pliocene
Faunal stage: Blancan

~5.6-2.6 mya, calculates to a period of 3 million years (s.l.)

~4.6-2.6 mya, calculates to a period of 2 million years (s.s.)

== Geologic setting ==
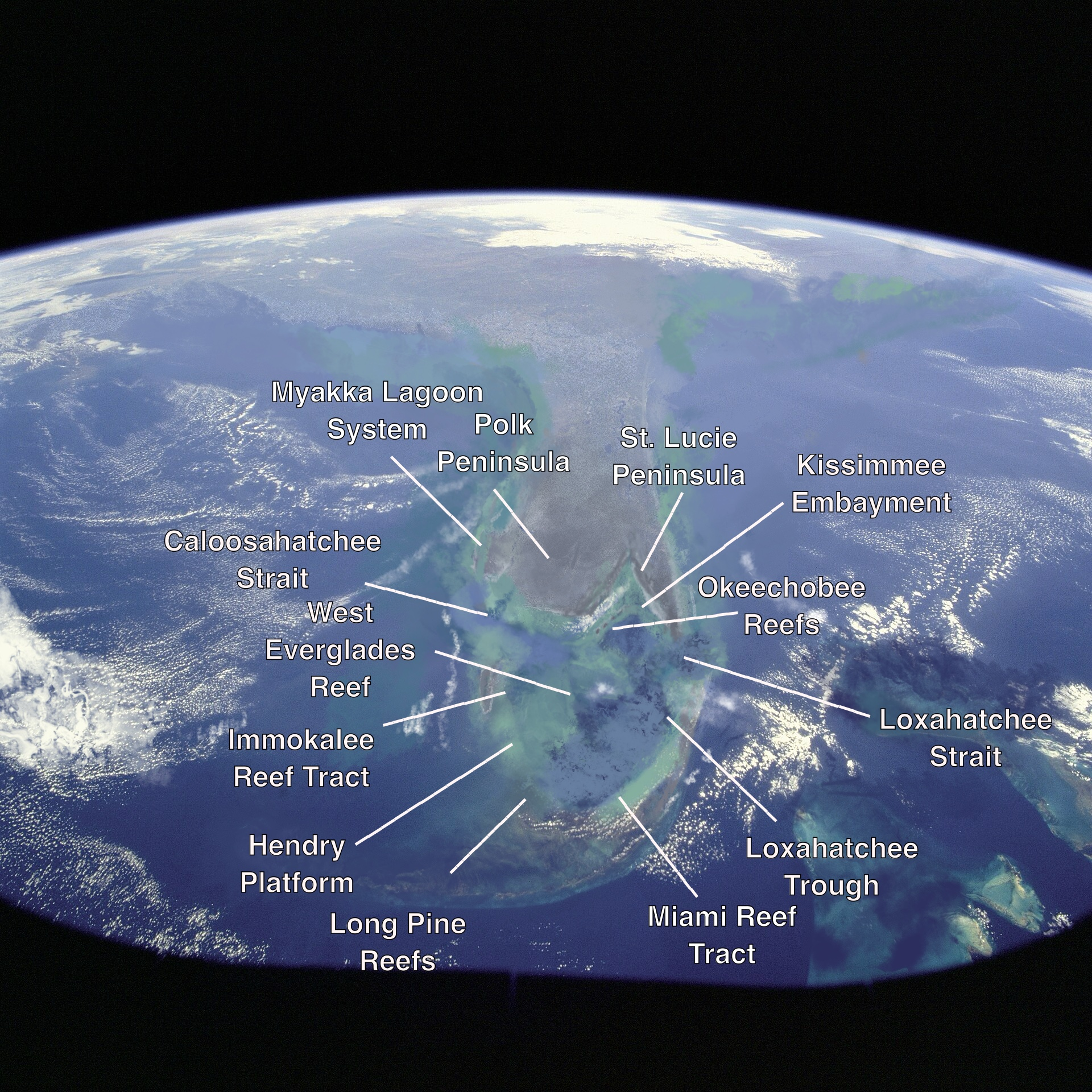
The Tamiami Subsea of Piaceznian Florida

The Tamiami Formation s.l. began deposition within the final years of the Messinian in Murdock Subsea of the Okeechobean Sea. This subsea was dominated by deposition within the Immokalee Delta. Barnacle reefs dominated this area.

The Tamiami (in the strict sense, or sensu stricto, abbreviated here as s.s.) began with deposition in the Pliocene Tamiami Subsea. Florida at this time was split between the Polk Peninsula and the St. Lucie Peninsula. Mammals like camelids, three species of giant ground sloth (including Eremotherium), two armadillos, giant raccoons, walruses, peccaries, seals, giant capybaras, giant gophers, and gompotheres occupied the peninsulas. Birds like gulls, sanderlings, ducks, and flamingoes occupied the coasts. Giant tortoises, softshelled turtles and alligator snapping turtles were also present. Oaks, birches, beeches, maples, pines, sweetgum and holly trees are known from pollen.

Large hurricanes formed with the emergence of the Isthmus of Panama. Quartz sand from the panhandle was carried south, and the Kissimmee River was active in deposition in what was the Kissimmee Embayment. The Everglades region was dominated by the Everglades Pseudoatoll, consisting of various islands and reefs. Whales often traversed the Caloosahatchee and Loxahatchee Straits.

The Buckingham and Ochopee Limestone members were deposited contemporaneously in the Pliocene. Golden Gate Reef Member was deposited in the Middle Pliocene, at a depth of 20-25 meters. The Fruitville Member, (sometimes referred to as the Fruitville Formation) is the uppermost member of the Tamiami Formation.

== Mass Extinction Event ==
The Tamiami Formation's (molluscan) Acline Fauna is more diverse than that of the modern molluscan fauna of the Caribbean. By the time of the overlying Caloosahatchee Formation, large amounts of these species were already extinct. In 1993, Warren Allmon and Gary Rosenburg hypothesized that the Pinecrest Beds displayed high rates of both speciation and extinction throughout its deposition, whilst keeping a small but consistent level of biodiversity. Two years later, Petuch demonstrated a two-stage mass extinction event, the first stage occurring after the Pinecrest Beds, and the second occurring after the Caloosahatchee Formation.

== Location ==
The Tamiami Formation appears in the counties of Charlotte, Lee, Hendry, Hardee, DeSoto, Hillsborough, Pinellas, Collier, Palm Beach, Miami-Dade, Sarasota, Manatee, Okeechobee, and Monroe. It is widespread in Florida and part of the intermediate confining aquifer system. The Tamiami formation overlies the Hawthorn at every locality where the Hawthorn has been penetrated and is overlain unconformably by the Caloosahatchee marl of the Pleistocene in South Florida.

== Composition ==
The Tamiami Formation contains a wide range of mixed carbonate-siliciclastic lithologies and associated faunas. It occurs at or near the land surface in the southern peninsula with numerous named and unnamed members recognized within the Tamiami Formation. Its unevenness indicates that the upper part has been subjected to erosion. Microtektites are known from the Pinecrest Beds.

== Lithologies ==
The Tamiami Formation includes:

- light gray to tan, unconsolidated, fine to coarse grained sand with fossils
- light gray to green, poorly consolidated, fossil bearing sandy clay to clayey sand
- light gray, poorly consolidated, very fine to medium grained, calcareous, fossil bearing sand
- white to light gray, poorly consolidated, sandy, fossil bearing limestone
- white to light gray, moderately to well hardened, sandy, fossiliferous limestone

Phosphate is present in limited quantities throughout the Tamiami in sand and gravel.

== Sub-units ==
- Bonita Springs Marl Member(?)
- Fruitville Member(?)
- Golden Gate Reef Member
- Murdock Station Member(s.l.)
- Ochopee Limestone Member
- Pinecrest Sand Member
- Sarasota Member(s.l.)

== Fossils ==
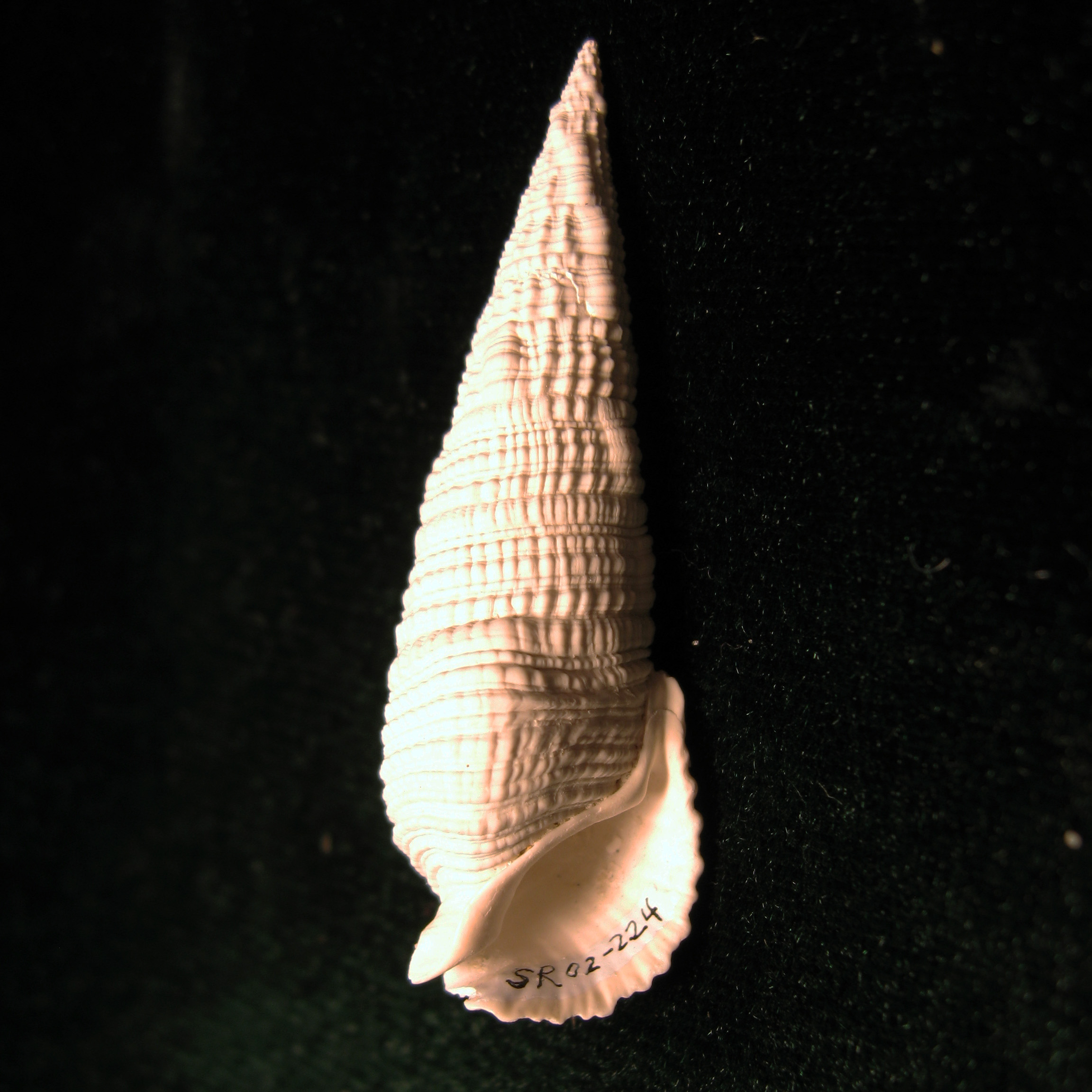
Fossil (Cerithium dalli) from the Tamiami Formation

The Tamiami Formation preserves many fossils. These include plants, animals, protists, and haptophytes. and Fossils appear in casts and molds, as well as original material, ichnotaxa, and mineralized forms.

The Tamiami Formation also contains many scientifically and culturally significant fossil taxa. The ancestral species of wolves, dogs, and coyotes, Canis lepophagus, is present in the Pinecrest Beds. The earliest known occurrence of a Cryptochirid, Galacticus duerri was found in the Pinecrest Beds. Ecphora quadricostata, an iconic ecphora snail, is present through the Tamiami Formation.

== In culture ==
The Tamiami Formation has been used for spiritual purposes since humans populated the region. Shark teeth and limestones from the formation were collected for healing purposes and to make ceremonial objects. Fossil shark teeth from the gulf coast are still collected as a hobby and occasionally used for spiritual practice.

The fossil mollusks from the Tamiami Formation are used in road construction and mulches. Fossils from the formation can be found in some asphalt roads and many dirt roads. Concrete in Sarasota and Venice is sometimes decorated with Tamiami formation fossils. Shells of the formation have also been used in the reinterment of Tocobagan People.
