= Fort Thompson Formation =

Geologic formation in Florida. It preserves fossils dating back to the Neogene period

- Stratigraphic range: Late Pleistocene
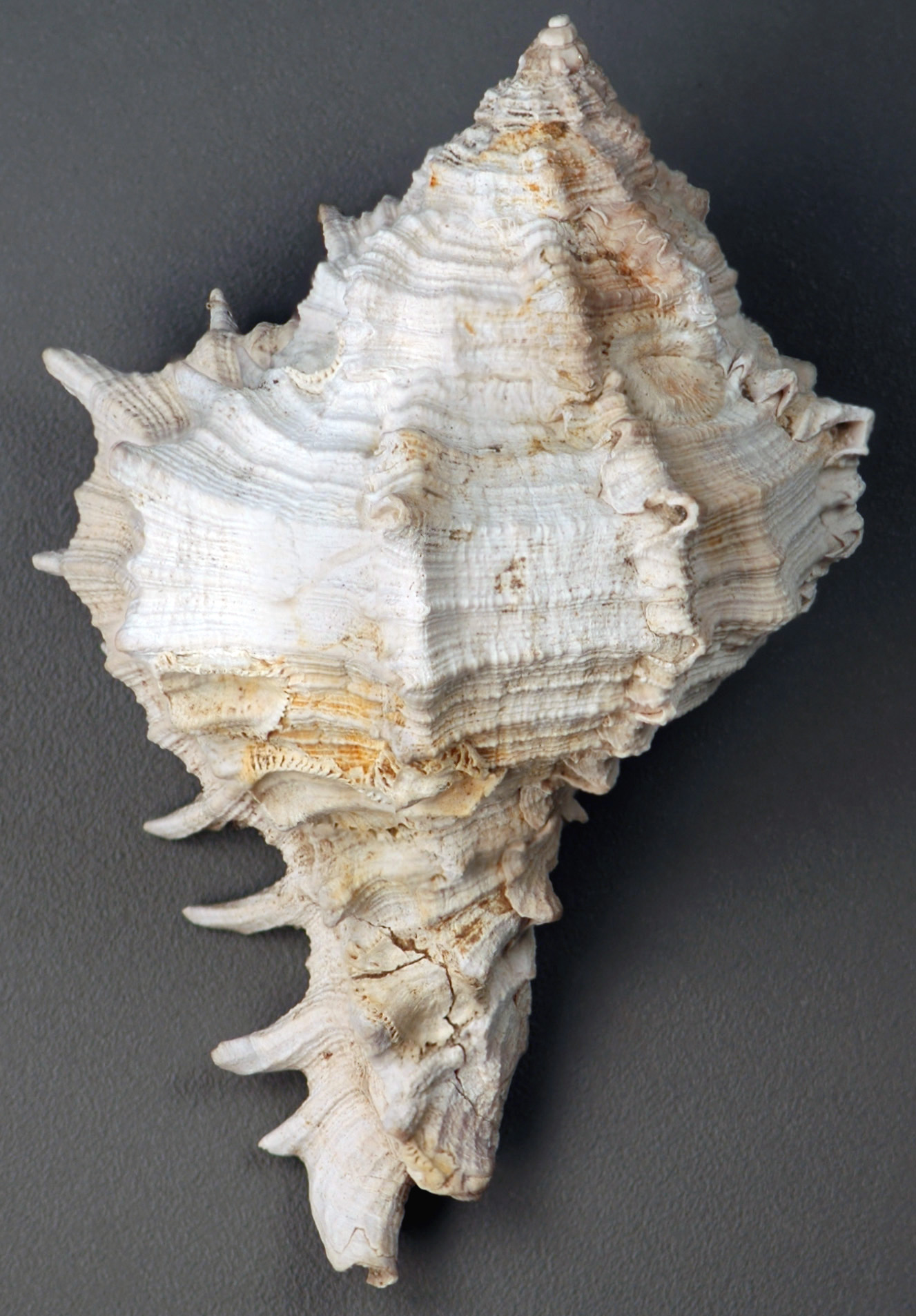
- Murex snail shell fossil from the Pleistocene
- Type: Formation
- Underlies: Coffee Mill Hammock Formation, Anastasia Formation
- Overlies: Bermont Formation

Location
- Region: Florida
- Country: United States

The Fort Thompson Formation is a geologic formation in Florida. It preserves fossils dating back to the late Pleistocene. It was influenced by sea level changes.

== See also ==
- List of fossiliferous stratigraphic units in Florida
