= Parachucla Formation =

Geological formation in the southeastern U.S.

- Stratigraphic range: Late Oligocene – Early Miocene
- Type: Geological formation
- Unit of: Hawthorn Group
- Sub-units: Tiger Leap Member, Porters Landing Member
- Underlies: Marks Head Formation
- Overlies: Suwannee Limestone, Lazaretto Creek Formation

Location
- Region: Florida, Georgia, South Carolina
- Country: United States

The Parachucla Formation is a geologic formation in the southeastern United States. It preserves fossils from the Aquitanian stage of the early Miocene period. The formation is included in the Hawthorn Group. An exposure at the northern end of the formation has produced fossils estimated to be 19.4 to 20.5 Million years ago (Ma). Another exposure at the southern end of the formation has produced fossils estimated to be 23.9 to 24.7 Ma.

== Descriptive history ==
The Parachucla Formation was defined in 1908 by Earle Sloan as "weakly lithified shales and mudstones, olive-grey to dark-greenish-grey in color, that crop out on the Savannah River". In 1988, Paul Huddlestun added calcareous beds that underlay Sloan's Parachucla Formation to the formation, calling the new addition the Tiger Leap Member, and the original formation defined by Sloan the Porters Landing Member. In 2001, Weems and Edwards removed the Tiger Leap Member from the Parachucla Formation, raising it in rank to the Tiger Leap Formation and dropping the Porters Landing Member name. Other authors continue to use the Huddlestun definition, which includes the Tiger Leap Member in the formation.

== Extent and Age ==
The Parachucla Formation (or the Porters Landing Member of the formation, depending on definition), is a quartz sand and clay structure lacking fossils, formed in the late Aquitanian stage of the early Miocene period. It lies above the Tiger Leap Formation (or Tiger Leap Member of the Parachucla Formation), a chalky, shelly sand structure with phosphate and microfossils, which formed in the Oligocene epoch. The Tiger Leap unit is underlain in part by the Suwannee Limestone, the Lazaretto Creek Formation, and other unnamed units. The Parachucla Formation is overlain in part by the Marks Head Formation. The Parachula Formation trends deeper from north to south. In Effingham County, near the Savannah River, the top of the formation is 163 feet (50 m) below sea level. On Cumberland Island, it is 420 feet (130 m), and next to the St. Marys River, 423 feet (129 m) below sea level. The formation (or Porters Landing Member) maintains a fairly consistent thickness along most of the north-south line in coastal Georgia, 30 feet (9.1 m) thick in Effingham County, then 40 feet (12 m) to 46 feet (14 m) from Richmond Hill to Cumberland Island. The formation thins rapidly south of Cumberland Island, being only 10 feet (3.0 m) thick near the St. Marys River. The Parachucla Formation in Georgia appears to be narrow. No indication of the formation (or Porters Landing Member) was found in bore holes in Evans County, to the west of Richmond Hill, or at Fort Pulaski, to the east. The siliciclastic beds of the Parachucla Formation resemble those of the equivalent Penney Farms Formation in Florida, but the Penney Farms Formation has carbonate beds which are not found in the Parachucla. Exposed strata along the Suwannee River near White Springs in Hamilton County, Florida, which correlate with the Porters Landing Member strata found along the Savannah River, is the only known occurrence of the Parachucla Formation in Florida. The Parachucla Formation is the lowest unit of the Hawthorn Group in Georgia. The Parachucla Formation also grades into the Chattahoochee Formation in southwest Georgia and the eastern panhandle of Florida. Off the Georgia coast, the Parachucla grades into the Cooper Formation. The Tiger Leap and Porters Landing members appear to be separated by an unconformity.

Clam shells (Ostrea normalis) from two locations were tested for age using Strontium isotope stratigraphy. Shells from the Parachucla Formation exposure at White Springs in northern Florida yielded age estimates of 23.9 to 24.7 Million years ago (Ma). Shells from the formation exposure at Porters Landing in northern Georgia yielded age estimates of 19.4 to 20.5 Ma.

== Fossils ==
=== White Springs Local Fauna ===
The Parachucla Formation (Porters Landing Member) in northern Florida is associated with the White Springs Local Fauna, consisting of fossils of 57 vertebrate species from the Arikareean stage of the late Oligocene epoch. The fossils of the White Springs Local Fauna have been collected from sites on an approximately 10 km long stretch along the Suwannee River where the Parachucla Formation is exposed. The local fauna includes a number of fossils of near-shore marine and land vertebrates, including 9 sharks, 5 rays, 14 bony fish, 6 reptiles, and 27 mammals. The reptiles include a marine crocodile, an alligator, a tortoise, and three snakes (a blind snake and two species of boas). The fossils of three sirenians (Crenatosiren olseni, Dioplotherium manigaulti and a Metaxytherium species) have been found at those sites (White Springs is the holotype site for C. olseni). Rodents in the White Springs Local Fauna include species of the eomyid Arikareeomys and the cricetid Leidymys genera, the squirrels Protosciurus and Nototamias, and three species of geomyid rodents. Other small land mammals in the White Springs Local Fauna include a lagomorph (Palaeolagus or Megalagus), two bats, and a marsupial. Larger mammals include a horse (Miohippus or Anchippus texanus), an oreodont (Mesoredon floridensis), three different camelids (including a Oxydactylus species), and a small rhinoceros (possibly a species of Diceratherium).

Most of the land vertebrate fossils in the White Spring Local Fauna are teeth or post-cranial bones of smaller animals. Semi-articulated skeletons of larger mammals have been found at one location along the exposure. It is believed that the land vertebrate bones were carried into a delta or coastal lagoon by a river before burial.

=== Invertebrate fossils ===
The dinoflagellates Sumatradinium soucouyantiae, Chordosphaeridium cantharellus, and Exochosphaeridium insigne are typical of the Parachucla Formation in Georgia. Cribroperidinium species are also common.

Sixty-five taxa of invertebrates have been identified in the Porters Landing Member of the Parachucla Formation at the White Springs exposure in north Florida. Included in these are the bivalves Chlamys acanikos and Ostrea normalis and the barnacles Concavus crassostrictola, Balanus reflexus and a species of Solidobalanus.

=== Mammals ===
Color key: Taxon / Reclassified taxon / Taxon falsely reported as present / Dubious taxon or junior synonym / Ichnotaxon / Ootaxon / Morphotaxon

Notes
Uncertain or tentative taxa are in small text
~~crossed out~~ taxa are discredited.

Sirenians
Genus	Species	Presence	Material	Notes	Images
Crenatosiren	C. olseni	White Springs Local Fauna of the Porters Landing Member	A portion of a mandible was recovered from the White Springs site.	A dugongid originally placed in the genus Halitherium. Partial skulls, mandibles, and ribs of C. olseni have been found in the Ashley and Chandler Bridge formations in South Carolina.	
Metaxytherium	M. albifontanum	White Springs Local Fauna of the Porters Landing Member	A skull, upper vertrabral column, and ribs were recovered from the White Springs site.	A dugongid also found in the Chandler Bridge Formation.	

=== Fish ===
Sharks
Genus	Species	Presence	Material	Notes	Images
Otodus	O. angustidens		A tooth (UF 17994).	A megatoothed shark.	

=== Invertebrates ===
Crustaceans
Genus	Species	Presence	Material	Notes	Images
Balanus	B. reflexus	Porters Landing Member.	Scutum (UF 25603a).	A balanid barnacle.	
Concavus	C. crassostricola	Porters Landing Member.	13 scuta, 1 tergum, 3 shells.	A balanid barnacle.	
Solidobalanus	S. sp. indet.	Porters Landing Member.	2 scuta, disarticulated compartmental plates.	An archaeobalanid barnacle.	

== See also ==
- List of fossiliferous stratigraphic units in Florida
- List of fossiliferous stratigraphic units in Georgia (U.S. state)

== Sources ==
- Domning, Daryl P. (1997-06-19). "Fossil Sirenia of the west Atlantic and Caribbean region. VI. Crenatosiren olseni (Reinhart, 1976)". Journal of Vertebrate Paleontology. 17 (2): 397–412. Bibcode:1997JVPal..17..397D. doi:10.1080/02724634.1997.10010984. ISSN 0272-4634.
- Huddlestun, Paul F. (1993). "An Overview of the Neogene of Georgia". In Zulio, Victor A.; Harris, W. Burleigh; Scott, Thomas M.; Portell, Roger W. (eds.). The Neogene of Florida and Adjacent Regions: Special Publication 37: Proceedings of the Third Bald Island Conference on Coastal Plains Geology (PDF) (Report). Tallahassee, Florida: Florida Geological Survey. pp. 91–96. Archived from the original (PDF) on 2023-12-03.
- Jones, Douglas S.; Mueller, Paul A.; Hodell, David A.; Stanley, Laura A. (1993). "^{87}SR/^{86}SR Geochronology of Oligocene and Miocene Marine Strata in Florida". In Zulio, Victor A.; Harris, W. Burleigh; Scott, Thomas M.; Portell, Roger W. (eds.). The Neogene of Florida and Adjacent Regions: Special Publication 37: Proceedings of the Third Bald Island Conference on Coastal Plains Geology (PDF) (Report). Tallahassee, Florida: Florida Geological Survey. pp. 15–26. Archived from the original (PDF) on 2023-12-03.
- MacFadden, Bruce J.; Morgan, Gary S. (November 2003). "Chapter 15". Bulletin of the American Museum of Natural History. 2003 (279): 368–396. doi:10.1206/0003-0090(2003)279<0368:C>2.0.CO;2 – via BioOne.
- Morgan, Gary S. (1993). "Mammalian Biochronology and Marine-Nonmarine Correlations in the Neogene". In Zulio, Victor A.; Harris, W. Burleigh; Scott, Thomas M.; Portell, Roger W. (eds.). The Neogene of Florida and Adjacent Regions: Special Publication 37: Proceedings of the Third Bald Island Conference on Coastal Plains Geology (PDF) (Report). Tallahassee, Florida: Florida Geological Survey. pp. 55–66. Archived from the original (PDF) on 2023-12-03.
- Scott, Thomas M. (1988). The lithostratigraphy of the Hawthorn Group (Miocene) of Florida: Florida Geological Survey Bulletin 59 (PDF) (Report). Tallahassee, Florida: Florida Geological Survey.
- Self-Trail, Jean M.; Parker, Mercer; Haynes, John T.; Schultz, Arthur P.; Huddlestun, Paul F. (2019). "Geology and biostratigraphy of the Upper Floridan aquifer in the greater Savannah region, Georgia and South Carolina". Stratigraphy. 16 (1): 41–62. Bibcode:2019Strat..16...41S. doi:10.29041/strat.16.1.41-62 – via ResearchGate.
- Vélez-Juarbe, Jorge; Domning, Daryl P. (2014). "Fossil Sirenia of the West Atlantic and Caribbean Region. Ix. Metaxytherium Albifontanum, Sp. Nov". Journal of Vertebrate Paleontology. 34 (2): 444–464. Bibcode:2014JVPal..34..444V. doi:10.1080/02724634.2013.799072. ISSN 0272-4634. JSTOR 24523238. S2CID 86498351.
- Weems, Robert E.; Edwards, Lucy E. (2001). Geology of Oligocene, Miocene, and Younger Deposits in the Coastal Area of Georgia, Bulletin 131 (PDF) (Report). Atlanta, Georgia: Georgia Geologic Survey. Archived from the original (PDF) on September 24, 2015.
- Zullo, Victor A.; Portell, Roger W. (1991). "Balanoid Barnacles from the Early Miocene Parachucla and Penney Farms Formations, Northern Florida". Tulane Studies in Geology and Paleontology. 24 (4): 79–86.
