= List of fossiliferous stratigraphic units in Georgia (U.S. state) =

Group or Formation	Period	Notes
Alum Bluff Group/Oak Grove Formation	Neogene	
Barnwell Group/Clinchfield Formation	Paleogene	
Blue Bluff Formation	Paleogene	
Blufftown Formation	Cretaceous	
Bridgeboro Limestone	Paleogene	
Chattahoochee Formation	Paleogene	
Claiborne Group/Gosport Sand	Paleogene	
Claiborne Group/Lisbon Formation	Paleogene	
Claiborne Group/Tallahatta Formation	Paleogene	
Clayton Formation	Paleogene	
Conasauga Formation	Cambrian	
Crab Orchard Mountains Group	Carboniferous	
Eutaw Formation	Cretaceous	
Flint River Formation	Paleogene	
Floyd Shale	Carboniferous	
Gaillard Formation	Cretaceous	
Hawthorn Group/Arcadia Formation	Paleogene	
Hawthorne Group/Marks Head Formation	Neogene	
Jacksonian Formation	Paleogene	
Lee Group/Vandever Shale & Rockcastle Sandstone	Carboniferous	
Leipers Limestone	Ordovician	
Lourdes Formation	Ordovician	
McBean Formation	Paleogene	
Moodys Branch Formation	Paleogene	
Ocala Formation	Paleogene	
Pamlico Formation	Neogene period	
Pottsville Group/Walden Sandstone	Carboniferous	
Providence Sand	Cretaceous	
Ripley Formation	Cretaceous	
Satilla Formation		
Statenville Formation	Neogene	
Tobacco Road Formation	Paleogene	
Twiggs Clay	Paleogene	
Vicksburg Group/Suwannee Limestone	Paleogene	
Wilcox Group/Hatchetigbee Bluff Formation	Paleogene	

== See also ==
- Paleontology in Georgia (U.S. state)
