= Arcadia Formation =

Geologic formation in Florida

- Stratigraphic range: Early Miocene
- Type: Geological formation
- Unit of: Hawthorn Group
- Sub-units: Nocatee Member, Tampa Member
- Underlies: Peace River Formation
- Overlies: Ocala Limestone, Suwannee Limestone
- Thickness: Up to 650 feet (200 m)

Lithology
- Primary: limestone, dolomite
- Other: sand, clay, phosphate grains

Location
- Region: Central and southern Florida
- Country: United States

Type section
- Named for: Arcadia, Florida
- Named by: T. M. Scott
- Location: Core W-12050, Hogan #1, DeSoto County
- Year defined: 1988
- Thickness at type section: 423 feet (129 m)

The Arcadia Formation is an Early Miocene geologic formation in Florida, United States. It is part of the Hawthorn Group.

== Age ==
Period: Neogene
Epoch: Early Miocene
Faunal stage: Aquitanian through early Burdigalian

The age of the Hawthorne Group is not very clear. Much of the formation has been reworked, and there are few fossils that are diagnostic for a particular age. Some fossil evidence and correlations with neighboring formations indicate that the age of the Arcadian Formation ranges from the earliest Miocene to late Early Miocene (mid-Burdigalian faunal stage). More abundant planktonic, mollusc, and vertebrate fossils in the overlying Peace River Formation indicate that it began in the early Middle Miocene (early Langhian faunal stage.

== Extent ==
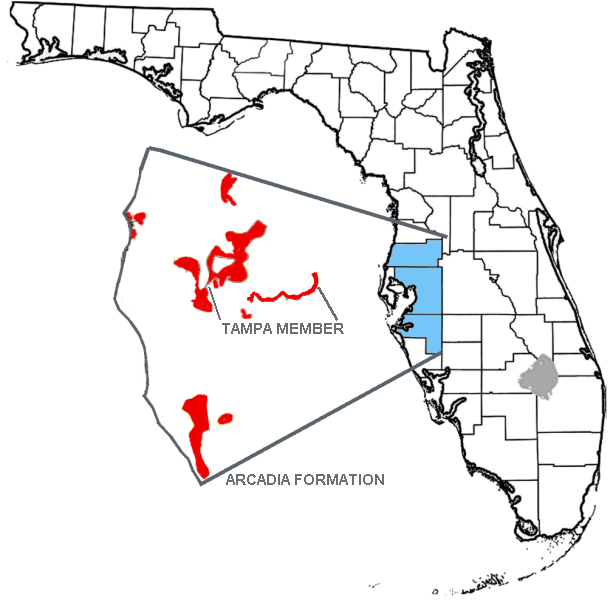
Extent of surface exposure of the Arcadia Formation.

The Arcadia Formation extends from at least Pasco and Polk counties in central Florida to Miami-Dade and Monroe counties at the southern end of the Florida peninsula, and possibly to the upper Florida Keys. It is thin or absent along the east coast of the Florida peninsula north of Indian River County. It is buried beneath later formations over most of its extent, with the exception of surface exposures in the area around Tampa Bay (in Hillsborough, Manatee, and Pasco counties). The top of the formation slopes downward from north to south, from more than 100 feet (30 m) above mean sea level (MSL) in Polk County to 440 feet (130 m) below MSL in Monroe County, and perhaps to more than 750 feet (230 m) below MSL in Miami-Dade and Palm Beach counties. Although there is some variability in the slope of the top of the formation at the northern end, the general slope from north to south is about 5 feet per mile (95 cm/km). The thickness of the formation also generally increases from north to south, to 593 feet (181 m) in Charlotte County, and more than 650 feet (200 m) in southern Miami-Dade County.

Parts of the Arcadia Formation are designated the Nocatee and Tampa Members. The Arcadia Formation has two distinct levels. The basal unit includes the Nocatee and Tampa Members and other unnamed Arcadia members, and an upper unit they call " Type Arcadia".

== Composition ==
The Arcadia Formation is composed of limestones and dolomites which are yellowish gray to light olive gray to light brown in color. The texture is micro to finely crystalline with varying sandy, clayey limestones and dolomites containing phosphate. The clays are yellowish gray to light olive gray in color. They are moderately hard as well as sandy, silty, phosphatic and dolomitic. Silicified carbonates and opalized claystone have also been found.

== Origin ==
The Arcadia Formation developed when sea levels rose to flood much of the Florida Platform late in the Oligocene epoch. While part of central Florida remained above sea level as Orange Island, southern Florida was covered by the Okeechobean Sea, which extended over the Everglades basin, and was bound on the south by oyster banks, the Collier Bank curving up on the western side, and the Dade Bank curving up on the eastern side. What is now the central Gulf Coast of the Florida peninsula was covered by the Tampa Subsea, a large lagoon system separated from the open Gulf of Mexico by the Tampa Reef Tract and Tampa Archipelago. During the Aquitanian faunal stage (early in the Miocene), extensive upwelling around the Florida Platform carried plankton into the Okeechobean Sea and Tampa Subsea, depositing phosphorus-rich carbonate layers in the basins. The deposits in the Okeechobean Sea became the Nocatee Member of the Arcadia Formation, and the deposits in the Tampa Subsea became the Tampa Member.

== Nocatee Member ==
The Nocatee Member is the only part of the Arcadia Formation that is primarily siliciclastic. The member has a limited extent compared to the rest of the Arcadia Formation, occurring throughout Charlotte, DeSoto, and Hardee counties, in southwestern Polk County, in westernmost Highlands and Glades counties, in easternmost Manatee and Sarasota counties, and in northernmost Lee County.

== Tampa Member ==
The Tampa Member consists predominantly of limestone with subordinate dolomite, sand and clay very similar to that of the subsurface limestone part of the Arcadia Formation. There is considerably less phosphate. The color is white to yellowish gray. It is fossil bearing and variably sandy and clayey mudstone, wackestone, and packstone with little to no phosphate grains. Sand and clay beds are like those in the undifferentiated sediments of the Arcadia Formation.

Invertebrate fossils from the Tampa Member were first collected in 1842 by Timothy Abbott Conrad. The fossil beds of the Tampa Member have since been studied by William Healey Dall, Gilbert Dennison Harris, and Angelo Heilprin, as well as others. The Fauna represented by the fossils is primarily marine, but including some land snails. The marine fauna is dominated by molluscs, but includes corals, barnacles, and foraminifera. Over 300 species of molluscs have been reported from the Tampa Member beds. The fossils suggest a late Oligocene to early Miocene age for the Tampa Member, but are not entirely diagnostic of age.

In 1892 Dall divided the Tampa fossil bearing beds into two divisions, the "Orthaulax bed" (later called the "Orthaulax pugnax zone"), and the "Tampa Limestone". The two divisions were later united as the "Tampa Formation". In 1945, C. W. Cooke classified the early Miocene strata throughout Florida as the "Tampa Limestone". In 1964, H. S. Puri and R. O. Vernon classified the Early Miocene strata in Florida as the "Tampa Stage", consisting of the Chattahoochee and St. Marks formations. Scott demoted the "Tampa Formation" to "Tampa Member" and combined it with other previously unnamed Hawthorn Group strata in the "Arcadia Formation" in 1988.

The Tampa Member is located in DeSoto, Hardee, Hillsborough, Manatee, Pinellas, and Sarasota counties, and the northern portion of Charlotte County. It consists of carbonate sediments deposited in the Early Miocene Hillsborough Lagoon System and the Tampa Reef Track and Tampa Archipelago, which bordered the lagoon system. The top of the Tampa Member is 23 m above mean sea level in northeastern Hillsborough County, dipping to more than 100 m below mean sea level in Manatee County and 98.5 m below mean sea level in Sarasota County. It has an average thickness of 30.5 m, reach 82 m thick in Sarasota County. The Tampa Member lies above the Nocatee Member in some areas. It overlies undifferentiated Arcadia sediments in other areas, and is overlain by other undifferentiated Arcadia deposits. Erosion has removed the Tampa Member north of Hillsborough County leaving only a few isolated remnants. Beds of Tampa sediments interleave with bed of undifferentiated Arcadia sediments throughout the lower part of the Arcadia Formation. Areas were the Tampa beds are thick and predominate are designated the Tampa Member, but thin, isolated Tampa beds are found elsewhere in the lower Arcadia Formation.

== Aquifers ==
Two aquifers include parts of the Arcadia Formation. The Floridan Aquifer extends throughout Florida and most of the coastal plain in Georgia, as well as small adjacent areas in Alabama and South Carolina. The Florida Aquifer in general lies below the Arcadia Formation, with only the lower part of the Tampa Member included in the aquifer. The Florida Aquifer is the main source of fresh water for many cities and smaller communities throughout Florida. In 1985, more than 2.5 billion US gallons (9.5 Gl) per day were pumped from the aquifer.

The Intermediate Aquifer System lies under southwestern Florida, from southern Hillsborough and southwestern Polk counties to Collier County. The aquifer includes the upper part of the Tampa Member, undifferentiated Arcadia Formation strata above the Tampa Member, the Peace River Formation, and the lower part of the Tamiami Formation, which lies above the Peace River Formation. As does the Arcadia Formation, the aquifer slopes and becomes thicker from north and northeast to south and southwest. The aquifer is the main source of fresh water for Sarasota, Charlotte and Lee counties.

== Paleofauna ==
The Arcadia Formation proper contains molds and casts in dolomite containing mollusks. The Tampa Member contains mollusks and corals in molds and casts with silicified pseudomorphs and shell material.

== Sources ==
- Compton, John S. (1997). "Origin and Paleoceanographic Significance of Florida's Phosphorite Deposits". In Randazzo, Anthony F.; Jones, Douglas S. (eds.). The Geology of Florida. Gainesville, Florida: University Press of Florida. pp. 195–216. ISBN 0-8130-1496-4.
- Miller, James A. (1997). "Hydrogeology of Florida". In Randazzo, Anthony F.; Jones, Douglas S. (eds.). The Geology of Florida. Gainesville, Florida: University Press of Florida. pp. 69–88. ISBN 0-8130-1496-4.
- Jones, Douglas S. (1997). "The Marine Invertebrate Fossil Record of Florida". In Randazzo, Anthony F.; Jones, Douglas S. (eds.). The Geology of Florida. Gainesville, Florida: University Press of Florida. pp. 89–117. ISBN 0-8130-1496-4.
- Petuch, Edward J.; Berschauer, David P. (2022). "Chapter 3: The Tampa Subsea (Arcadia Formation)". Ancient Seas of Southern Florida. Boca Raton, Florida: CRC Press. pp. 29–38. ISBN 9780367566333.
- Petuch, Edward J.; Roberts, Charles E. (2007). The Geology of the Everglades and Adjacent Areas. Boca Raton, Florida: CRC Press. pp. 32–40. ISBN 978-1-4200-4558-1.
- Scott, Thomas M. (1988). The lithostratigraphy of the Hawthorn Group (Miocene) of Florida: Florida Geological Survey Bulletin 59 (PDF) (Report). Florida Geological Survey.
- Scott, Thomas M. (1997). "Miocene to Holocene History of Florida". In Randazzo, Anthony F.; Jones, Douglas S. (eds.). The Geology of Florida. Gainesville, Florida: University Press of Florida. pp. 57–67. ISBN 0-8130-1496-4.
- USGS Lithostratigraphic Units of Florida
- Florida Carbonate "Formations" and Conflicting Interpretations of Injection Well Regulations
