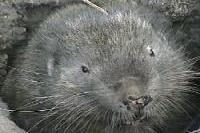
- Mountain beaver (Aplodontia rufa)

Scientific classification
- Kingdom: Animalia
- Phylum: Chordata
- Class: Mammalia
- Infraclass: Placentalia
- Order: Rodentia
- Suborder: Sciurognathi; Tullberg, 1899

Infraorders
- Anomaluromorpha; Castorimorpha; Ctenodactylomorpha; Geomorpha; Glirimorpha; Myodonta; Sciurida

= Sciurognathi =

Suborder of rodents

Sciurognathi is a historical suborder of rodents that includes squirrels, chipmunks, beavers, and many types of mice. The group is characterized by a specific shape to the lower jaw. In sciurognaths, the angular process of the jaw is in the same plane as the root of the incisors. This is in contrast to the suborder Hystricognathi where the angular process is outside the plane formed at the root of the incisor due to the presence of a shelf for muscle attachment.

The sciurognathous condition is considered to be the primitive condition in rodents, and is therefore not a good character for cladistic analysis. Although hystricognaths are almost universally accepted as representing a real evolutionary grouping, most researchers do not consider Sciurognathi as an equally valid group. In particular, gundis are thought to be more closely related to the hystricognathous rodents than to other sciurognaths. In spite of this, most texts continue to use these two suborders due primarily to a lack of a viable alternative.

Alternatively, some texts group rodents into three suborders on the basis of the shape of the infraorbital canal. According to this taxonomy the rodents are divided into the suborders Sciuromorpha, Hystricomorpha, and Myomorpha.

== See also ==
- Castorimorpha
- Anomaluromorpha
