= St. Marks Formation =

- Stratigraphic range: Miocene
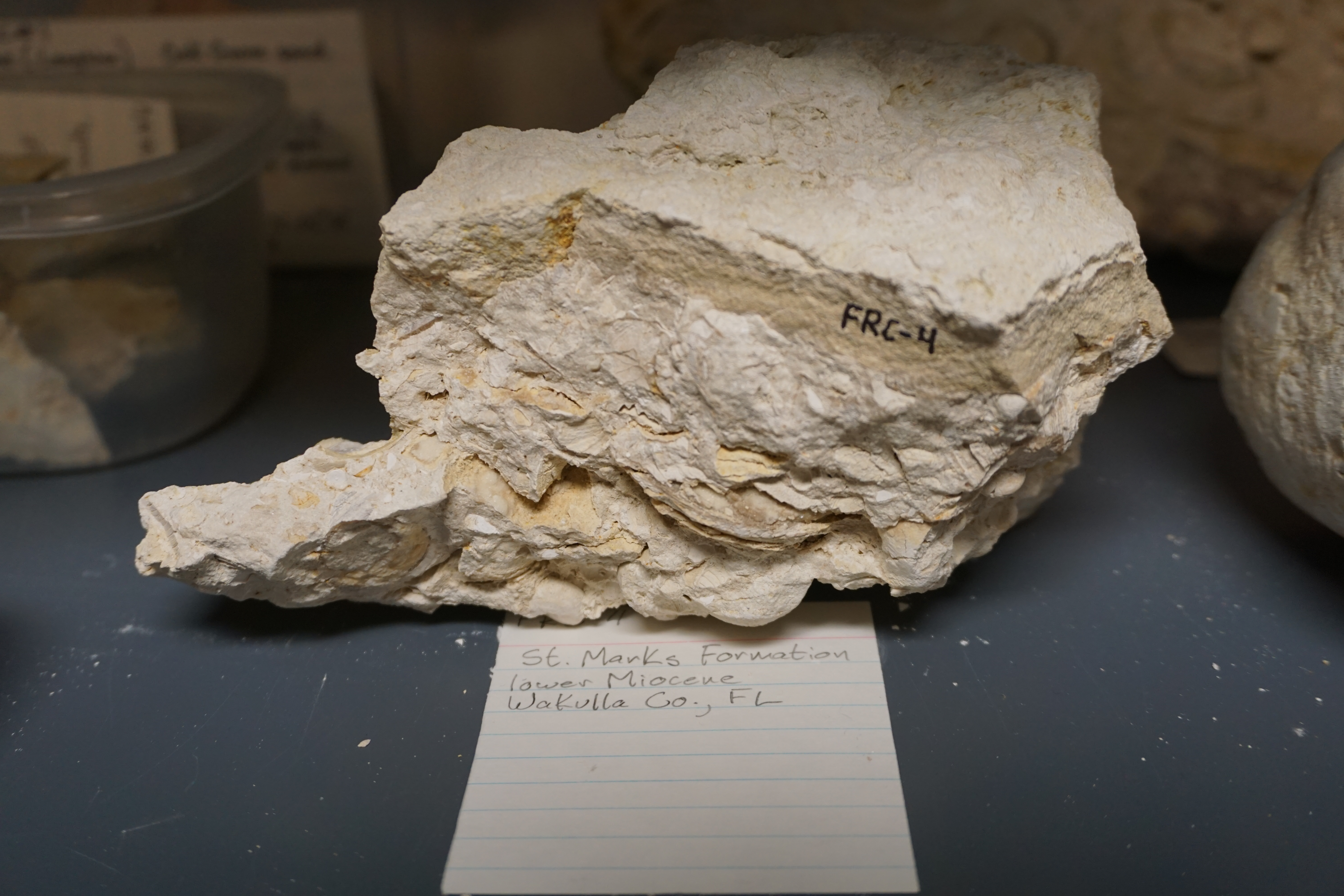
- Type: Rock sample from the St. Marks Formation
- Unit of: None
- Sub-units: None

Lithology
- Primary: Limestone & sand

Location
- Region: Florida Panhandle
- Country: United States
- Extent: Jefferson, Leon, and Wakulla counties

Type section
- Named for: St. Marks River
- Named by: J. Finch, 1823

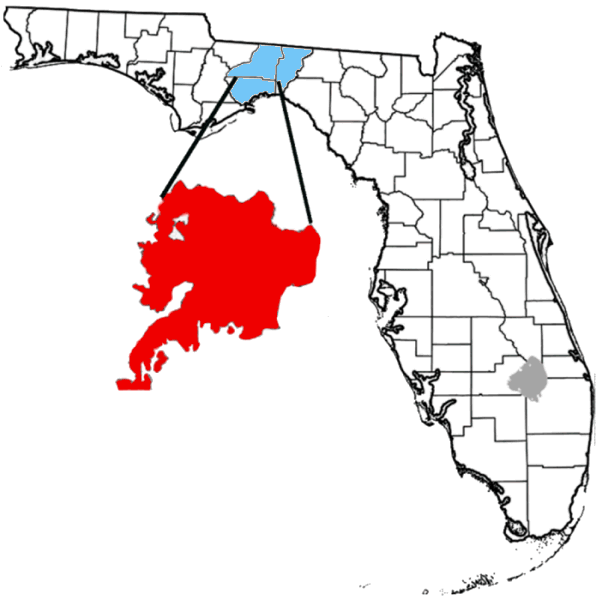
St. Marks Formation location in red.

The St. Marks Formation is a Miocene geologic formation in the eastern Florida Panhandle.

== Age ==
Period: Neogene
Epoch: Miocene ~23.03 to 5.33 mya, calculates to a period of 17.7 million years
Faunal stage: Arikareean through Hemphillian

== Location ==
The St. Marks Formation is exposed in Wakulla, southern Leon and southern Jefferson County, Florida on the northwestern flank of the Ocala Platform and along with Suwannee Limestone and Ocala Limestone makes up the upper part of the Floridan Aquifer in the eastern panhandle.

== Composition ==
The St. Marks Formation consists of a white to yellowish gray, poorly to moderately hard, sandy, fossil bearing rock in molds and casts within packstone to wackestone.

== Fossils ==
The fossils are in molds and casts and include:

- Mollusks
