= Tiger Leap Formation =

Geological formation outcropping in Georgia, United States

- Stratigraphic range: Oligocene
- Type: Formation

Location
- Region: Georgia
- Country: United States

The Tiger Leap Formation is a geologic formation in Georgia. It preserves fossils dating back to the Oligocene epoch. Some authorities classify it as the Tiger Leap Member of the Parachucla Formation.

The Tiger Leap unit was first defined as the Tiger Leap Member of the Parachucla Formation in 1988, when Paul Huddlestun added calcareous beds that underlay the Parachucla Formation to that formation. In 2001, Weems and Edwards removed the Tiger Leap Member from the Parachucla Formation, raising it in rank to the Tiger Leap Formation. Other authors continue to use the Huddlestun definition, which includes the Tiger Leap Member in the Parachulca Formation.

== See also ==
- List of fossiliferous stratigraphic units in Georgia (U.S. state)
- Paleontology in Georgia (U.S. state)

== Sources ==
- Self-Trail, Jean M.; Parker, Mercer; Haynes, John T.; Schultz, Arthur P.; Huddlestun, Paul F. (2019). "Geology and biostratigraphy of the Upper Floridan aquifer in the greater Savannah region, Georgia and South Carolina". Stratigraphy. 16 (1): 41–62. Bibcode:2019Strat..16...41S. doi:10.29041/strat.16.1.41-62 – via ResearchGate.
- Weems, Robert E.; Edwards, Lucy E. (2001). Geology of Oligocene, Miocene, and Younger Deposits in the Coastal Area of Georgia, Bulletin 131 (PDF) (Report). Atlanta, Georgia: Georgia Geologic Survey.
