= Suwannee Limestone =

Oligocene geological formation in Florida, USA

- Stratigraphic range: Early Oligocene Late Oligocene-aged fissure fill deposits
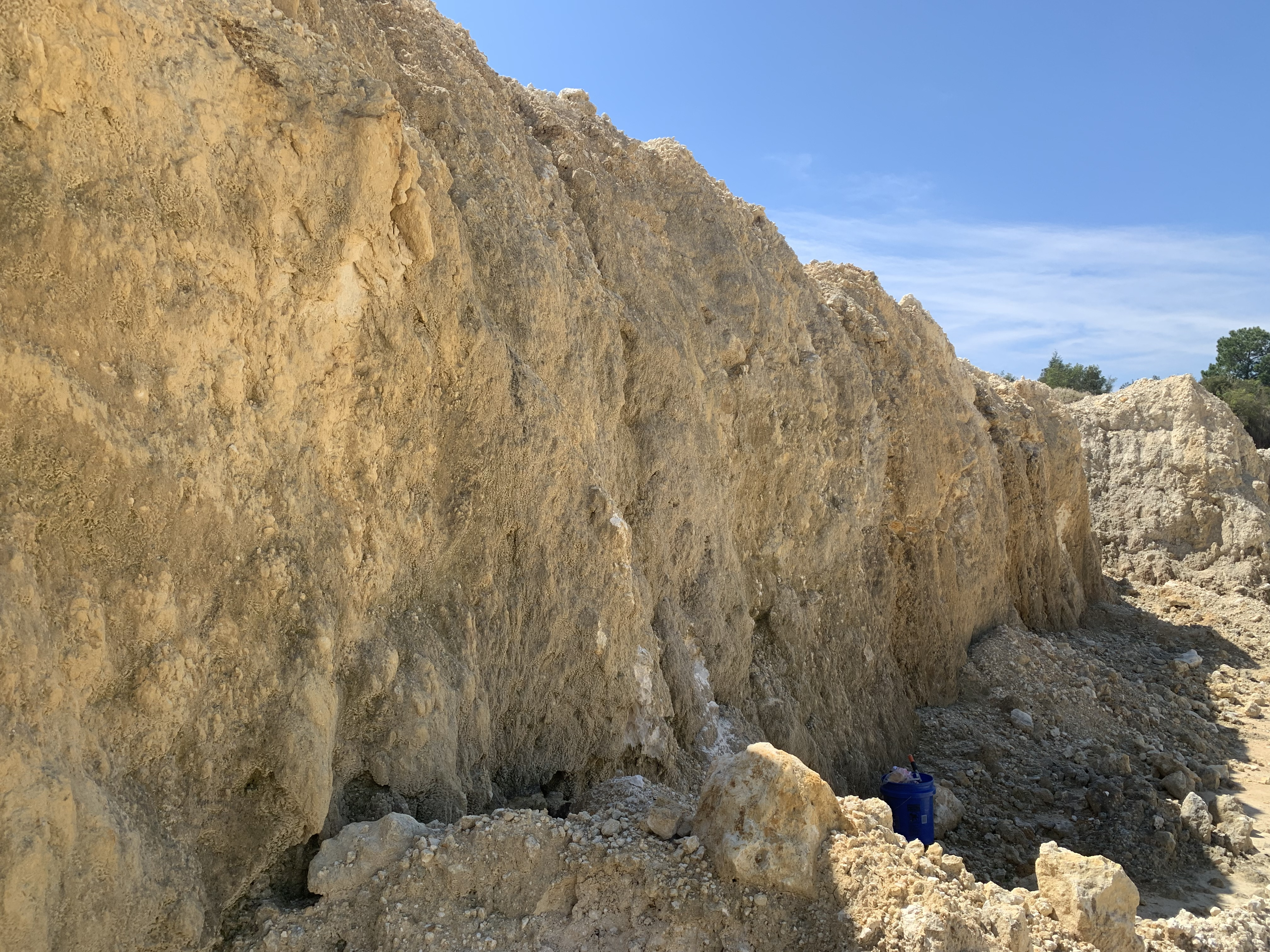
- Suwannee Limestone exposure in Brooksville, Florida
- Type: Geological formation
- Underlies: Hawthorn Group-Arcadia Formation
- Overlies: Ocala Limestone
- Thickness: 160 ft (49 m)

Lithology
- Primary: Limestone
- Other: Sandstone, claystone (fissure-fill deposits)

Location
- Region: North Florida
- Country: United States
- Extent: Leon to Hamilton to Taylor counties

Type section
- Named for: Suwannee River
- Named by: C.W. Cooke and W.C. Mansfield

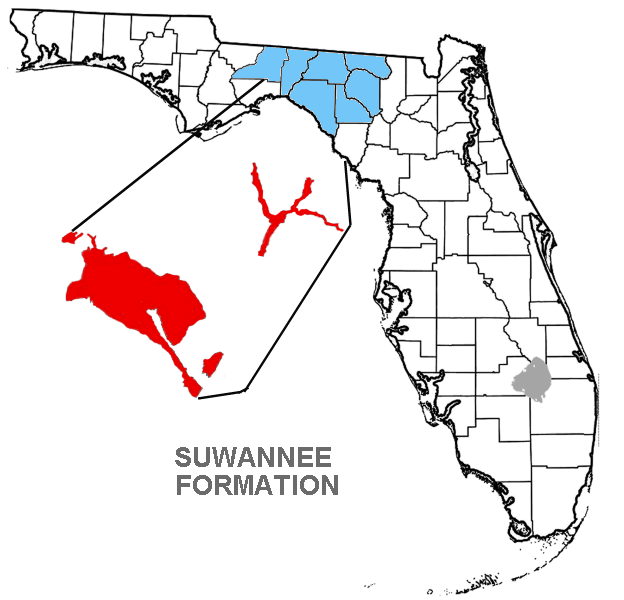
Location of Suwannee Formation in red.

The Suwannee Limestone is an Early Oligocene geologic formation of exposed fossiliferous limestones in North Florida, United States.

== Description ==
Suwannee Limestone is found in the peninsula carbonate outcroppings on the northwestern, northeastern and southwestern flanks of the Ocala Platform. However, Suwannee Limestone is not present on an area known as Orange Island on the eastern side of the Ocala Platform due to erosion, nondeposition or both. This limestone is present in southeastern Leon, Jefferson, Madison, Taylor, Lafayette counties as well as Hamilton along the upper Suwannee River basin, and southward into Suwannee County, Florida.

Early Oligocene Suwannee Limestone was recognized in the northwestern peninsula by P. F. Huddleston in 1993 as a triple subdivision of Suwannee Limestone, Ellaville Limestone, and Suwannacoochee Dolostone. The Suwannacoochee Dolostone was later officially renamed as the Suwannacoochee Dolomite.

=== Sedimentology ===
Suwannee Limestone consists of a white to cream, poorly to well hardened, fossil rich, vuggy to moldic grainstone and packstone. The dolomitized parts of the Suwannee Limestone are gray, tan, light brown to moderate brown, moderately to well indurated (hard), finely to coarsely crystalline, dolomite with limited occurrences of fossil-bearing beds. Limestone in silicate form is common in Suwannee Limestone.

=== Stratigraphy ===
The Suwannee Limestone overlies the Ocala Limestone and forms part of the intermediate confining unit/aquifer system. (USGS)

== Paleobiota ==
The Suwannee Limestone preserves numerous calcifying marine invertebrates, including foraminifers, echinoids, bryozoans and mollusks. Shark teeth belonging to Ginglymostoma and Carcharhinus are known from the Brooksville 2 site, which likely originate from the limestone formation rather than the fissure-fill fauna from the same locality.

=== Fissure-fill fauna ===
Not long after the formation of the Suwannee Limestone, falling sea levels during the latter part of the Oligocene led to its exposure on land. Terrestrial vertebrates that inhabited this newly-exposed karstic landscape at the time sometimes became trapped within sinkholes that opened in the limestone, which filled up with sand and clay as fissure-fill deposits, fossilizing their remains. These deposits date to the latest Oligocene (late Chattian or Arikareean stage), and preserve numerous animals whose remains are otherwise rare in the region due to a lack of terrestrial deposits. Two major localities that preserve such fossils are Brooksville 2 in Hernando County and SB-lA/Live Oak in Suwanee County.

The following fauna is known:

==== Amphibia ====
===== Anura =====
Genus	Species	Locality	Material	Notes	Images
Eleutherodactylus	E. sp.	Brooksville 2, Live Oak	174 fossils	An eleutherodactylid frog. The dominant frog taxon at the Brooksville site.	
Hylidae indet.				A tree frog of uncertain affinities.	
Ranidae indet.				A true frog of uncertain affinities.	
Rhinophryne	R. sp.	Brooksville 2		A rhinophrynid frog, related to the modern Mexican burrowing toad.	
Scaphiopodidae indet.				A spadefoot toad of uncertain affinities.	

===== Caudata =====
Genus	Species	Locality	Material	Notes	Images
Notophthalmus	N. sp.	Brooksville 2		A newt.	
Sirenidae indet.		Brooksville 2		A sirenid.	

==== Mammalia ====
===== Metatheria =====
Genus	Species	Locality	Material	Notes	Images
Herpetotherium	H. sp.	Brooksville 2, Live Oak		A herpetotheriid.	

===== Eulipotyphla =====
Genus	Species	Locality	Material	Notes	Images
Centetodon	C. magnus	Brooksville 2		A geolabidid.	
Parvericius	P. montanus	Brooksville 2		An erinaceid related to modern hedgehogs.	

===== Perissodactyla =====
Genus	Species	Locality	Material	Notes	Images
Miohippus	M. sp.	Brooksville 2		A three-toed horse.	

===== Artiodactyla =====
Genus	Species	Locality	Material	Notes	Images
Nanotragulus	N. loomisi	Brooksville 2		A hypertragulid.	
Nothokemas	N. waldropi	Brooksville 2, Live Oak		A camelid.	
Phenacocoelinae indet.				An merycoidodontid of uncertain affinities.	

===== Carnivora =====
Genus	Species	Locality	Material	Notes	Images
Acheronictis	A. webbi	Brooksville 2		A mustelid.	
Arikarictis	A. chapini	Brooksville 2, Live Oak		A mustelid.	
Daphoenodon	D. sp.	Live Oak		An amphicyonid.	
Enhydrocyon	E. cf. pahinsintewakpa	Brooksville 2		A hesperocyonine canid.	
Mammacyon	M. sp.	Live Oak		An amphicyonid.	
?Leptocyon	?L. sp.	Live Oak		A canine.	
Megalictis	M. sp.	Live Oak		An oligobunine mustelid.	
Osbornodon	O. wangi	Brooksville 2		A hesperocyonine canid.	
Palaeogale	P. minuta	Brooksville 2, Live Oak		A palaeogalid.	
Phlaocyon	P. taylori	Brooksville 2, Live Oak		A borophagine canid.	

===== Chiroptera =====
Genus	Species	Locality	Material	Notes	Images
Emballonuridae indet.		Brooksville 2		A sac-winged bat of uncertain affinities.	
Mormoopidae indet.		Brooksville 2		A ghost-faced bat of uncertain affinities.	
Phyllostomidae indet.		Brooksville 2		A leaf-nosed bat of uncertain affinities.	
Koopmanycteris	K. palaeomormoops	Brooksville 2		A ghost-faced bat.	
Vespertilionidae indet.		Brooksville 2		A vesper bat of uncertain affinities.	

===== Lagomorpha =====
Genus	Species	Locality	Material	Notes	Images
Megalagus	M. abaconis	Brooksville 2		A leporid related to modern hares and rabbits.	

===== Rodentia =====
Genus	Species	Locality	Material	Notes	Images
Agnotocastor	A. sp.	Brooksville 2		A castorid related to modern beavers.	
Entoptychinae indet.		Brooksville 2, Live Oak		An entoptychid geomyoid of uncertain affinities.	
Eomyidae indet.		Brooksville 2		An eomyid of uncertain affinities.	
Florentiamyidae indet.		Brooksville 2		A florentiamyid of uncertain affinities.	
Heliscomyidae indet.		Brooksville 2		A heliscomyid of uncertain affinities.	
Proheteromys	P. sp.	Brooksville 2, Live Oak			
Sciuridae indet.		Brooksville 2		A squirrel of uncertain affinities.	

==== Aves ====
Genus	Species	Locality	Material	Notes	Images
Galliformes indet.		Brooksville 2		A landfowl of uncertain affinities.	

==== Reptilia ====
===== Crocodylia =====
Genus	Species	Locality	Material	Notes	Images
Alligator	A. sp.	Brooksville 2		A small-sized alligator.	

===== Testudines =====
Genus	Species	Locality	Material	Notes	Images
Testudinidae indet.		Brooksville 2		A small-sized tortoise of uncertain affinities.	
Xenochelys	X. floridensis	Brooksville 2		A kinosternoid turtle.	

===== Squamata =====
Genus	Species	Locality	Material	Notes	Images
Anolis	A. "informal morphotype A"	Brooksville 2		An anole, two morphotypes known.	
Anolis	cf. A. "informal morphotype B"	Brooksville 2		An anole, two morphotypes known.	
Calamagras	C. sp.	Brooksville 2		A boid.	
Eublepharidae indet.		Brooksville 2		An eyelid gecko of uncertain affinities.	
Geringophis	G. sp.	Brooksville 2		A boid.	
Helodermatidae indet.		Brooksville 2		A beaded lizard of uncertain affinities.	
Iguanidae indet.		Brooksville 2		An iguanid of uncertain affinities.	
Ogmophis	O. sp.	Brooksville 2		A boid.	
Rhineuridae indet.		Brooksville 2		A rhineurid amphisbaenian, related to the modern Florida worm lizard.	
Scincidae indet.		Brooksville 2		A skink of uncertain affinities.	
Scolecophidia indet.		Brooksville 2		A blindsnake of uncertain affinities.	
