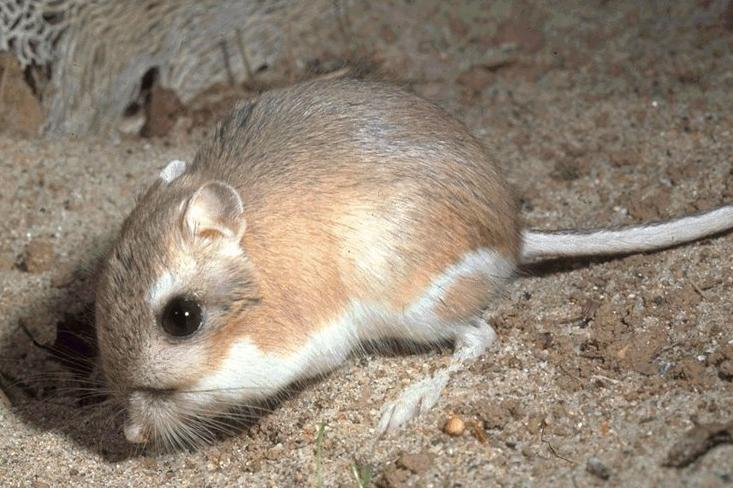
- Ord's kangaroo rat

Scientific classification
- Domain: Eukaryota
- Kingdom: Animalia
- Phylum: Chordata
- Class: Mammalia
- Order: Rodentia
- Suborder: Castorimorpha; Wood, 1955

Extant families
- Superfamily Castoroidea: Castoridae; Superfamily Geomyoidea: Heteromyidae; Geomyidae

= Castorimorpha =

Castorimorpha Temporal range: Early Eocene to Recent

Suborder of rodents

Castorimorpha is the suborder of rodents containing the beavers, gophers and the kangaroo rats. A 2017 study using retroposon markers indicated that they are most closely related to the Anomaluromorpha (the scaly-tailed squirrels and the springhare) and Myomorpha (mouse-like rodents).

== Taxonomy ==
- Suborder Castorimorpha
  - Superfamily Castoroidea
    - Family †Eutypomyidae
    - Family Castoridae – beavers
    - Family †Rhizospalacidae
  - Infraorder Geomorpha
    - Superfamily †Eomyoidea
      - Family †Eomyidae
    - Superfamily Geomyoidea
      - Family †Heliscomyidae
      - Family †Florentiamyidae
      - Family †Entoptychidae
      - Family Geomyidae – pocket gophers
      - Family Heteromyidae – kangaroo rats and mice
  - Diplolophidae
    - Genus †Floresomys
    - Genus †Texomys
    - Genus †Jimomys
    - Genus †Diplolophus
    - Genus †Schizodontomys
    - Genus †Griphomys
    - Genus †Meliakrouniomys

† indicates extinct taxa.
