= Avon Park Formation =

Middle Eocene geologic formation in Florida, U.S.

- Stratigraphic range: Eocene
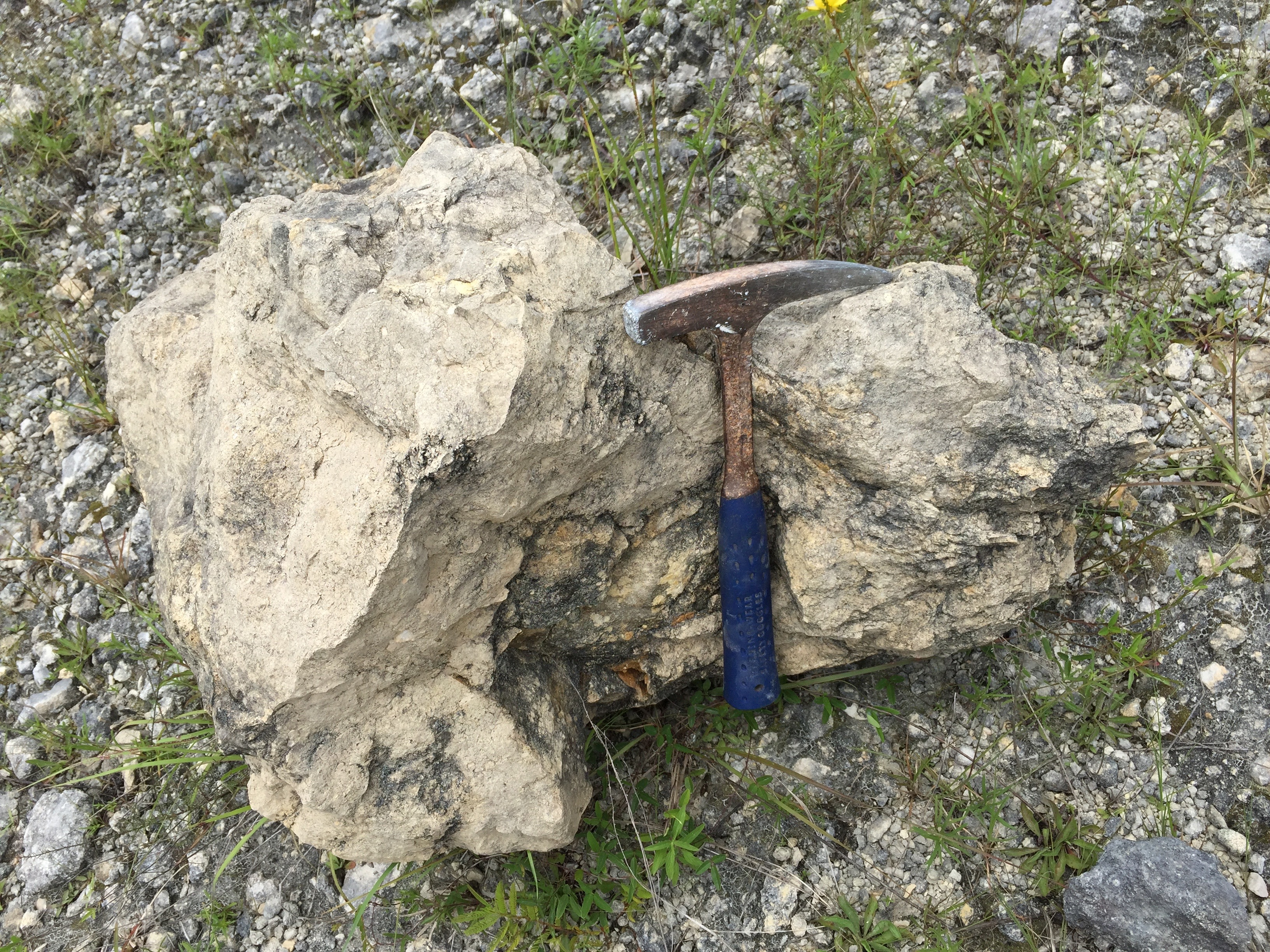
- Packstone from a dredge pile by the Cross Florida Barge Canal
- Type: Geological formation
- Sub-units: None
- Underlies: Ocala Limestone (in part)

Lithology
- Primary: Grainstone, packstone, wackestone
- Other: Mudstone

Location
- Region: Central Florida
- Country: United States
- Extent: Citrus and Levy County

Type section
- Named for: Avon Park, Florida
- Named by: Applin & Applin 1944

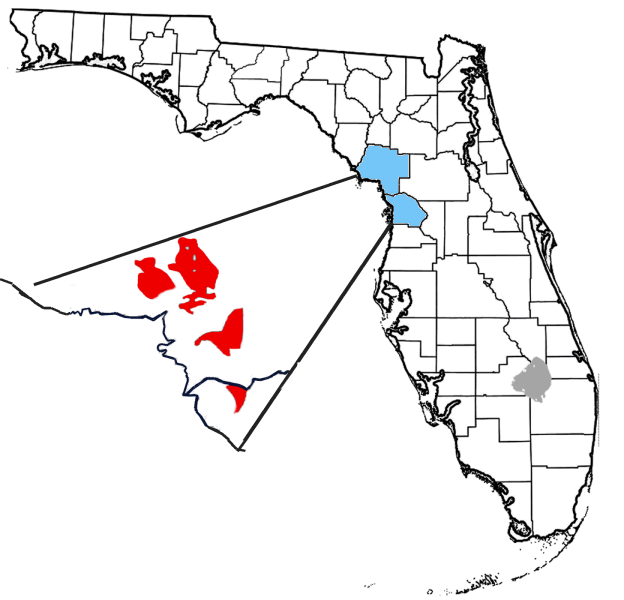
The Avon Park Formation on the crest of the Ocala Platform.

The Avon Park Formation is a Middle Eocene geologic formation and is the oldest exposed sediments in Florida, United States.

== Age ==
Period: Paleogene
Epoch: Middle Eocene~55.8 to 33.9 mya, calculates to a period of 21.9 million years
Faunal stage: Clarkforkian through early Chadronian

== Location ==
The Avon Park formation is located on the crest of the Ocala Platform in Levy County with three distinct outcroppings. Citrus County has one outcropping near the county line with Levy County.

== Composition ==
The Avon Park Formation consists of cream to light-brown or tan, poorly hardened to very hard, grainstone, packstone and wackestone, with rare mudstone. Fossils found throughout but not densely. These limestones are interbedded with vuggy dolomites which are soft to very hard and tan to brown, very fine to medium crystalline structure.

The Avon Park Formation, as with many formations, is part of the Floridan Aquifer system. Parts of the Avon Park Formation comprise important, subregional confining units within that system.

== Fossils ==
The fossils are in molds and casts and include:

- Mollusks
- Foraminifers
- Echinoids
- Algae
- Carbonized plants
