= Vandever Shale =

Geologic formation in Georgia, United States

- Stratigraphic range: Carboniferous
- Type: Formation

Location
- Region: Georgia
- Country: United States

The Vandever Shale is a geologic formation in Georgia. It preserves fossils dating back to the Carboniferous period.

== See also ==
- List of fossiliferous stratigraphic units in Georgia (U.S. state)
- Paleontology in Georgia (U.S. state)
