= Floyd Shale =

Geologic formation in Alabama and Georgia, USA

- Stratigraphic range: Carboniferous
- Type: Formation

Location
- Region: Georgia
- Country: United States

The Floyd Shale is a geologic formation in Alabama and Georgia. It preserves fossils dating back to the Carboniferous period.

== See also ==
- List of fossiliferous stratigraphic units in Georgia (U.S. state)
- Paleontology in Georgia (U.S. state)
