= Mojavemyinae =

Mojavemyinae Temporal range: middle to late Miocene

Scientific classification
- Kingdom: Animalia
- Phylum: Chordata
- Class: Mammalia
- Order: Rodentia
- Family: Geomyidae (?)
- Subfamily: †Mojavemyinae; Korth and Chaney, 1999

Genera
- †Mojavemys; †Phelosaccomys

Extinct subfamily of rodents

Mojavemyinae is an extinct subfamily of geomyoid rodents. When Mojavemyinae was named, it was not assigned to a family, with a relationship to either Geomyidae or Heteromyidae considered equally likely (Korth and Chaney, 1999), but consensus places the type genus, Mojavemys, in Geomyidae (McKenna and Bell, 1997; Feranec et al., 2005).
