= Lee Group =

The Lee Group
- Stratigraphic range: Carboniferous
- Type: Group

Location
- Region: Georgia
- Country: United States

The Lee Group is a geologic group in Georgia, United States. It preserves fossils dating back to the Carboniferous period.

== See also ==
- List of fossiliferous stratigraphic units in Georgia (U.S. state)
- Paleontology in Georgia (U.S. state)
