= Statenville Formation =

- Stratigraphic range: Miocene
- Type: Geological formation
- Unit of: Hawthorn Group
- Overlies: Coosawhatchie Formation (partial)

Lithology
- Primary: Sand, clay, dolomite
- Other: Phosphate

Location
- Region: North Florida
- Country: United States

Type section
- Named for: Beds near Statenville, Georgia
- Named by: Huddlestun (1988)

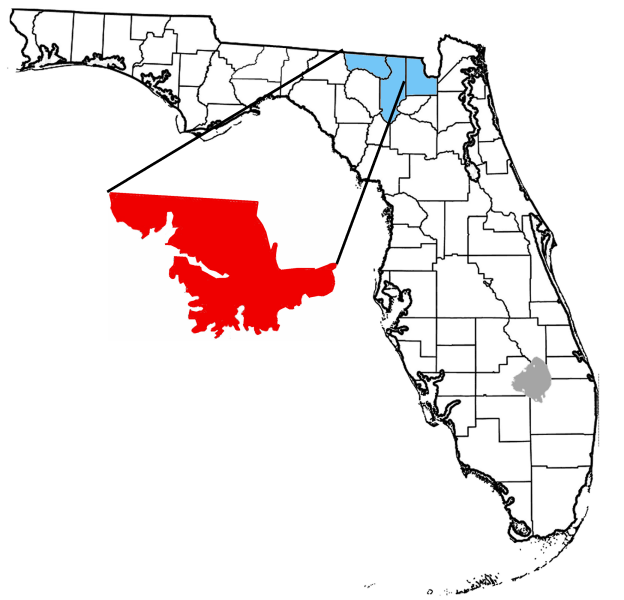
Location of the Statenville Formation.

The Statenville Formation is a geological formation of northern Florida, USA.

== Age ==
Period: Neogene
Epoch: Miocene
Faunal stage: Chattian through early Blancan ~28.4 to ~2.588 mya, calculates to a period of 25.512 million years

== Location ==
The Statenville Formation is found in Hamilton, Columbia, and Baker County, northeastern flank of the Ocala Platform.

== Composition ==
It is composed of sands of light gray to light olive gray color which not of great hardness and contains phosphate. The sand is fine to coarse grained with scattered gravel and with minor occurrences of fossils. Clay is yellowish gray to olive gray in color, poorly consolidated and variably sandy containing phosphate. Dolomite is in thin beds of yellowish gray to light orange, poorly to well indurated, sandy, clayey and containing phosphate grains.

The Statenville Formation partly overlies the Coosawhatchie Formation. Its permeability is generally low, forming part of the intermediate aquifer system. The phosphate content is of enough quantity to warrant mining.

== Fossils ==
Mollusks (silicified) in casts and molds.

Shark Teeth

Petrified Wood
