= Peace River Formation (Florida) =

Geological formation in Florida

- Stratigraphic range: Late Oligocene-Early Miocene
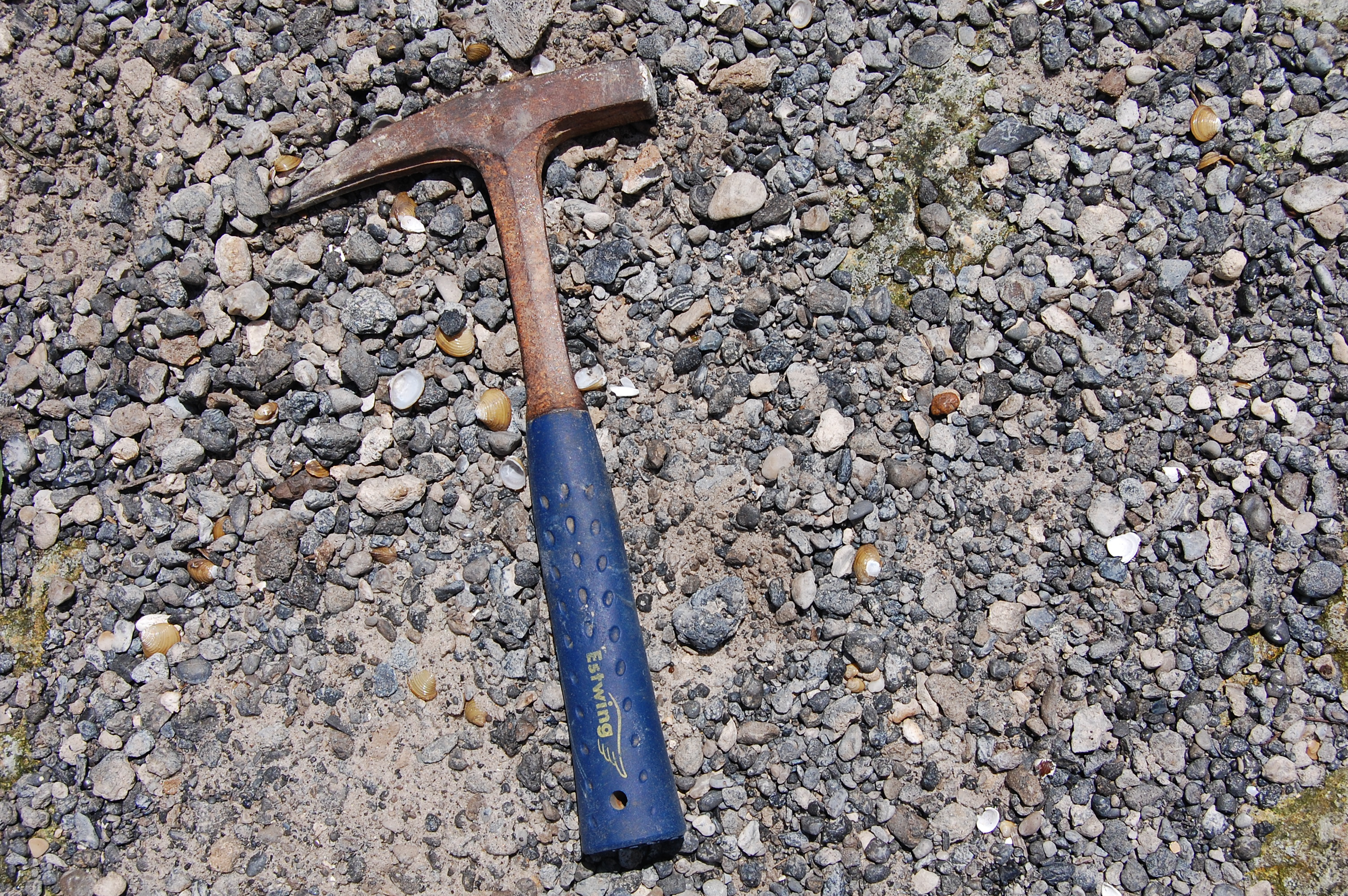
- Phosphatic gravel exposed on the bank of the Peace River near Zolfo Springs
- Type: Geological formation
- Unit of: Hawthorn Group
- Sub-units: Bone Valley Member
- Thickness: 600 feet

Lithology
- Primary: Sand, clay, carbonates
- Other: dolomite with phosphate, chert

Location
- Region: Central Florida
- Country: United States

Type section
- Named for: Peace River, Florida

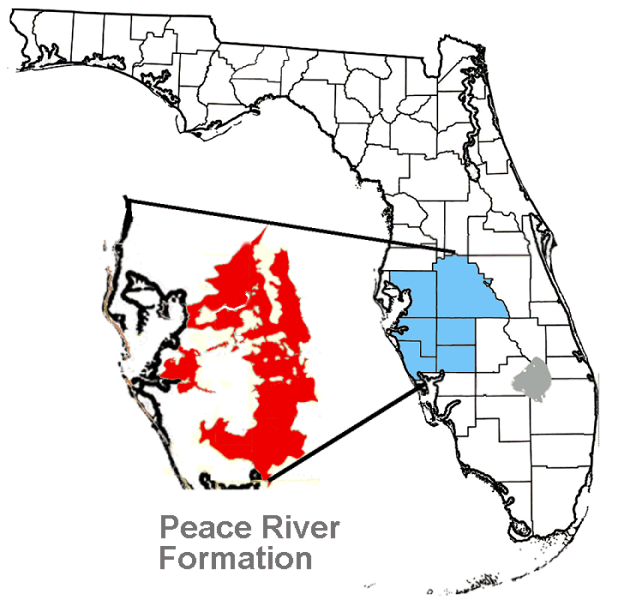
Location of the Peace River Formation in Florida.

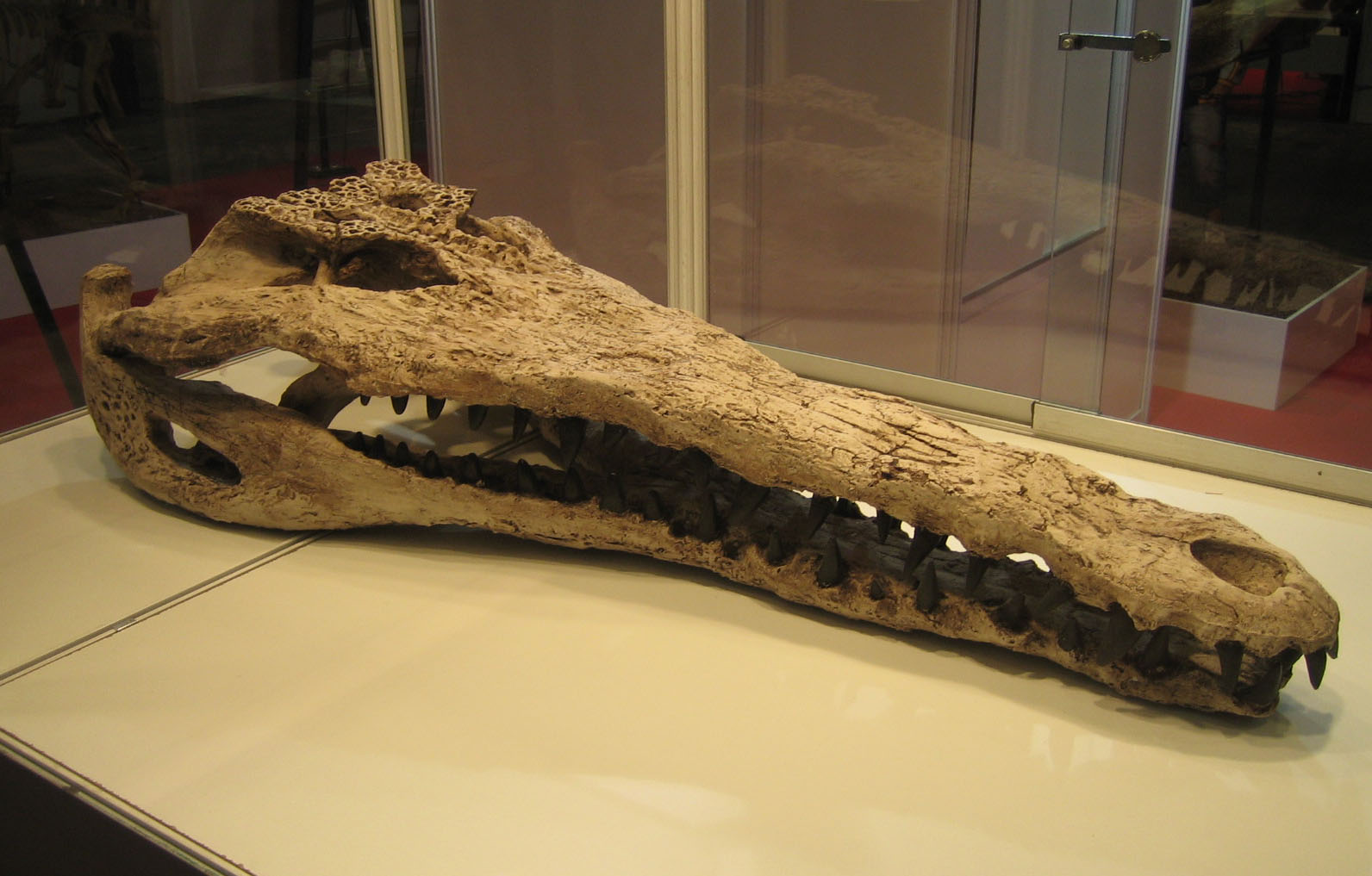
Fossil (Gavialosuchus americanus) from the Peace River Formation, Florida

The Peace River Formation is a Late Oligocene to Early Miocene geologic formation in the west-central Florida peninsula.

== Age ==
Period: Neogene
Epoch: Miocene to Pliocene
Faunal stage: Arikareean through Hemphillian, ~23.03–4.9 mya, calculates to a period of ~18.13 million years

== Location ==
The Peace River Formation appears as an outcropping or is beneath a thin overburden from Hillsborough County to Charlotte County on the southern part of the Ocala Platform. extending into the Okeechobee Basin. It is widespread in Florida and part of the intermediate confining aquifer system.

== Lithology ==
The formation is composed of sands, clays and carbonates which are interbedded. The sands are light gray to olive gray and poorly consolidated. They are clay-like with some dolomite with a very fine to medium grained phosphate component. Carbonates are usually light gray to yellowish dolomite found in outcroppings. The dolomites are soft to hard with variably sandy, clay-like, phosphate components with opaline chert often found. The phosphate content is high enough to warrant mining.

Three sequences of sediment deposition were defined in 1998. Five lithofacies were identified in 2000 (upper part of the formation).

- Diatomaceous mudstone
- Terrigenous mudstone
- Clay-rich quartz sand
- Quartz sand
- Pelecypod-rich quartz sand or sandstone

=== Fossils ===
- Mollusks occur as reworked casts, molds, and limited original shell material.
- Vertebrate fossils
- Shark's teeth
- Silicified corals and wood

== Members ==
The Bone Valley Member (originally the Bone Valley Formation) is a subunit of the Peace River Formation and occurs in a limited area on the southern part of the Ocala Platform in Hillsborough, Polk County, and Hardee County. (Webb & Crissinger). It is consistently clastic with sand-sized grains and larger grains of phosphate in a mixture of quartz sand, silt and clay. The consolidation is poor and colors range from white, light brown and yellowish gray to olive gray and blue green.

== See also ==
- Polk County, Florida paleontological sites
