= Barnwell Group =

Fossil site

- Stratigraphic range: Paleogene
- Type: Group

Location
- Region: Georgia
- Country: United States

The Barnwell Group is a geologic group in Georgia, United States. It preserves fossils dating back to the Paleogene period.

== See also ==
- List of fossiliferous stratigraphic units in Georgia (U.S. state)
- Paleontology in Georgia (U.S. state)
