= Clinchfield Formation =

Geologic formation in Georgia, U.S.

- Stratigraphic range: Paleogene
- Type: Formation

Location
- Region: Georgia
- Country: United States

The Clinchfield Formation is a geologic formation in Georgia. It preserves fossils dating back to the Paleogene period. It preserves the most diverse Eocene fossil turtle assemblage in all of southeastern North America.

== See also ==
- List of fossiliferous stratigraphic units in Georgia (U.S. state)
- Paleontology in Georgia (U.S. state)
