= Marks Head Formation =

- Stratigraphic range: Burdigalian; ~20–16 Ma
- Type: Formation
- Unit of: Hawthorne Group

Lithology
- Primary: Sandstone
- Other: Phosphorite

Location
- Coordinates: 32.6°N 81.4°W
- Approximate paleocoordinates: 32.9°N 77.6°W
- Region: Georgia
- Country: United States
- Marks Head Formation (the United States) Marks Head Formation (Georgia)

The Marks Head Formation is a geologic formation within the Hawthorn Group, located in southeastern Georgia and northern Florida. It preserves fossils dating back to the Burdigalian stage of the Miocene period.

== See also ==
- List of fossiliferous stratigraphic units in Georgia (U.S. state)
- Paleontology in Georgia (U.S. state)
