= Rhizospalax =

Rhizospalax Temporal range: Late Oligocene

Scientific classification
- Kingdom: Animalia
- Phylum: Chordata
- Class: Mammalia
- Order: Rodentia
- Suborder: Castorimorpha
- Superfamily: Castoroidea
- Family: †Rhizospalacidae; Thaler, 1966
- Genus: †Rhizospalax; Miller & Gidley, 1919

Extinct genus of rodents

Rhizospalax is a genus of extinct rodent from Europe thought to be distantly related to modern beavers. It is the only member of the family Rhizospalacidae.
