= Peninsular Arch =

Sub-surface structure of the geology of Florida

- Stratigraphic range: Jurassic
- Type: Geological structure
- Unit of: Florida Platform
- Sub-units: None

Lithology
- Primary: Carbonate

Location
- Region: North Florida to South Florida
- Country: United States

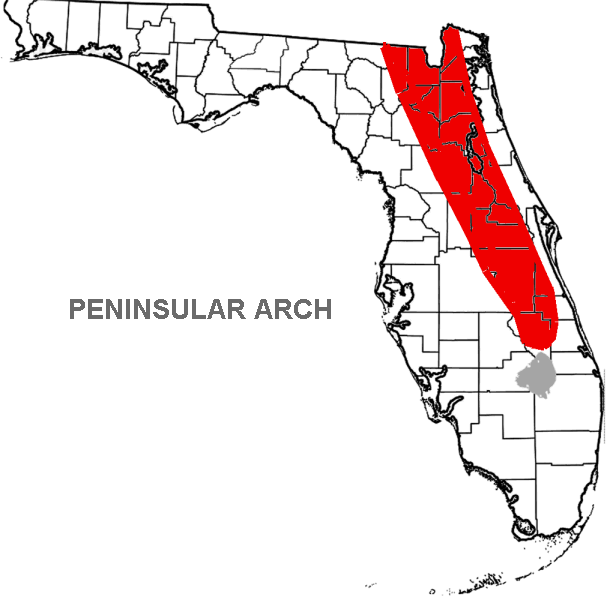
Location of the Peninsular Arch within Florida (in red).

The Peninsular Arch is a dominant sub-surface structure of the geology of Florida.

== Age ==
The arch was present from the Jurassic ~199.6–145.5 Ma through the Paleogene geological periods.

== Location ==
The Peninsular Arch extends from southeastern Georgia to just north of Lake Okeechobee in a general northwest to southeast trend. It is highest in Union County and Baker County. Its crest passes beneath Alachua County.

== Structure ==
The Peninsular Arch parallels the Ocala Platform to its west and is the dominant sub-surface feature within Florida. It is a structurally high area which affected deposition of sediments during the Cretaceous to the early Cenozoic. It was a high topographic feature during most of the Cretaceous but was covered with Late Cretaceous sediments and became an ideal base and settling point for carbonate sediments during the Eocene when that portion of land was submerged. According to Williams and T. M. Scott, the arch did not affect sediments from depositing during the Neogene through Holocene.
