= Coosawhatchie Formation =

Geologic formation in Florida, US

- Stratigraphic range: Miocene
- Type: Geological formation
- Unit of: Hawthorn Group
- Sub-units: Charlton Member

Lithology
- Primary: Sand, clay, limestone, dolomite, phosphate clay

Location
- Region: North Florida
- Country: United States

Type section
- Named for: Coosawhatchie River
- Named by: Dall and Stanley-Brown (1894)

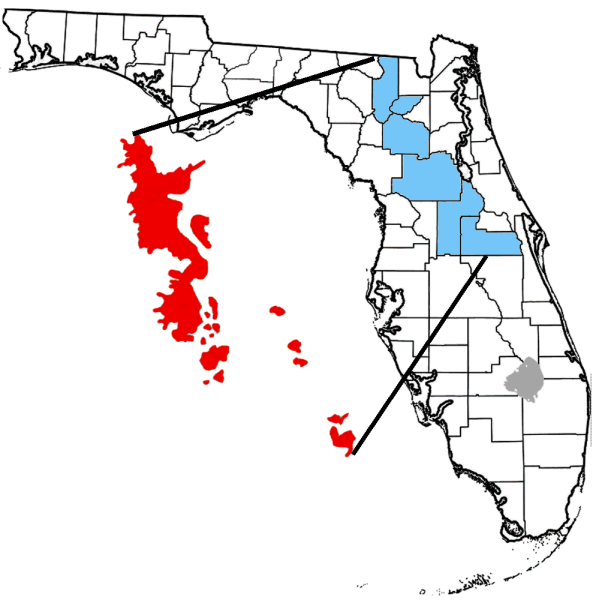
Location of Coosawhatchie Formation of Florida.

The Coosawhatchie Formation is a Miocene geologic formation with an outcrop in North Florida. It is within the Hawthorn Group.

== Age ==
Period: Neogene
Epoch: Miocene ~23.03 to 5.33 mya, calculates to a period of 17.7 million years
Faunal stage: Arikareean through Hemphillian

== Location ==
The Coosawhatchie Formation is located on the eastern flank of the Ocala Platform near southern Columbia County and southern Marion County, Florida. It extends south-southeast and is present in Alachua, Marion, Sumter, and Lake County. It is exposed or lies beneath a thin overburden.

== Lithography ==
The Coosawhatchie Formation varies in color from a light gray to olive gray. It is poorly consolidated, variably clayey and phosphate containing sand which occasionally contain a dolomitic component but rarely is it dominated with dolomite or limestone.

Silicified nodules are often present in the sediments and may contain 20% or more phosphate. The permeability factor of the Coosawhatchie sediments is generally low, forming part of the intermediate confining aquifer system.

== Members ==
Charlton Member outcrops in just one location, that being northern Nassau County, Florida near and along the St. Mary's River. Here it consists primarily of light gray to greenish gray, poorly to moderately consolidated, dolomite bearing to calcareous, silty, sandy, with few carbonate beds.

== Fossils ==
Few to no fossils and mostly contained in the Charlton Member.
