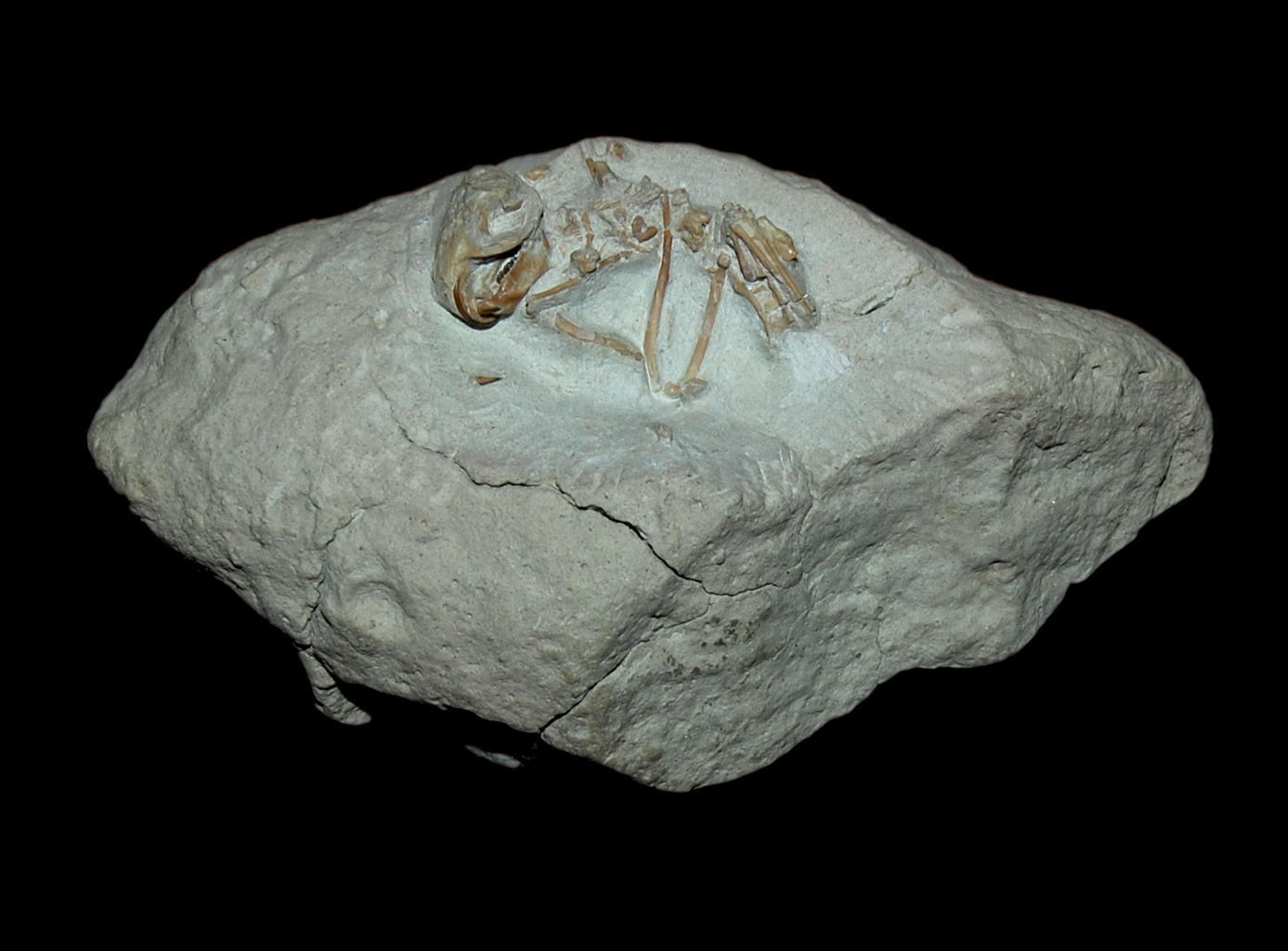
- Fossil

Scientific classification
- Kingdom: Animalia
- Phylum: Chordata
- Class: Mammalia
- Order: Rodentia
- Superfamily: Geomyoidea
- Family: †Heliscomyidae; Korth, Wahlert, and Emry, 1991

Genera
- †Apletotomeus; Heliscomys; Passaliscomys; Tylionomys

= Heliscomyidae =

Heliscomyidae Temporal range: Middle Eocene–Early Miocene

Extinct family of rodents

Heliscomyidae is a family of extinct rodents from the mid-Tertiary of North America related to pocket gophers (family Geomyidae) and kangaroo rats and their relatives (family Heteromyidae). The family contains four genera, Apletotomeus, Heliscomys, Passaliscomys, and Tylionomys (Korth et al., 1991; Korth and Eaton, 2004; Korth and Branciforte, 2007). McKenna and Bell (1997) placed the first two genera in synonymy, with Heliscomys as the senior synonym.

== Characteristics ==
Heliscomyids are distinguished from other geomyoid rodents by several characteristics of the skull including the fusion of three cranial foramina, elongation of the incisive foramina, and an unusual position of the mental foramen (Korth et al., 1991).

== Taxonomy ==
Heliscomyidae is a member of the clade Geomyoidea, a group of rodents that also includes the families †Eomyidae, †Florentiamyidae, Heteromyidae, and Geomyidae. The following cladogram showing interrelationships among geomyoid families follows Korth et al. (1991):

- Geomyoidea
  - †Eomyidae
  - - †Heliscomyidae
    - - †Florentiamyidae
      - - Geomyidae (pocket gophers)
        - Heteromyidae (kangaroo rats and mice, pocket mice)
