= Hawthorn Group =

Stratigraphic unit of Miocene age in South Carolina, Georgia, and Florida

- Stratigraphic range: Miocene
- Type: Group
- Sub-units: (See text)
- Overlies: Ocala Limestone
- Thickness: > 330 feet

Location
- Region: Southeastern United States
- Country: United States

Type section
- Named for: Hawthorne, Florida
- Named by: L.C. Johnson, 1887

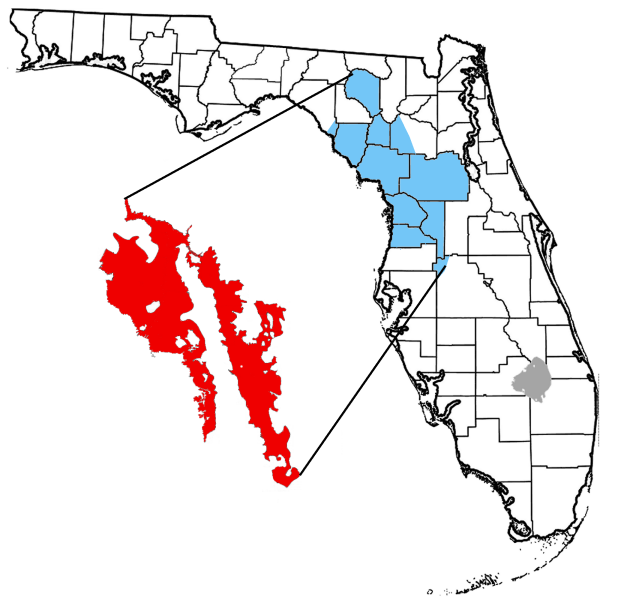
Location of the Hawthorn Group within Florida (in red).

The Hawthorn Group (also Hawthorne Group, previously called Hawthorn(e) Formation) (Note: The name has been spelled both with and without the final "e" since 1913. The Florida Geological Survey uses the spelling "Hawthorn", and the U.S. Geological Survey defers on the spelling of a unit name to the usage of the geological survey of the state in which the stratotype is located.) is a stratigraphic unit of Miocene age in South Carolina, Georgia, and Florida, in the United States. It is known for its phosphate rock resources, and for its rich assemblages of Neogene vertebrate fossils.

The Waldo Formation was described by L.C. Johnson of the United States Geological Survey in 1887. It was later included in the Hawthorne Beds, named for Hawthorne, Florida, where its phosphate-rich rock was quarried and processed for use as fertilizer. The Hawthrone Beds were later renamed the Hawthorne Formation. Late in the 20th century the Hawthorn Formation was redesignated as the Hawthorn Group consisting of several formations.

The Hawthorn Group is the widest spread stratigraphic unit of Miocene age in the southeastern United States, making up almost the entire thickness of Miocene strata over the area in which it occurs. The Hawthorn group has complex bedding, primarily consisting of clay, silt and sand. Stratigraphy varies, but the group usually consist of three main zones, a lower calcareous zone, a middle clastic zone, and an upper mixed zone of clastic and carbonate rocks. Phosphate deposits are found throughout the Hawthorn group, but particularly in the lower zone, where beds of dolomite and dolomitic limestone are found. Hawthorn Group deposits are mined for phosphate in central Florida.

The Hawthorn group was deposited on a continental shelf. It is predominantly siliciclastic, consisting primarily of fine-to medium-grained quartz sand. Clay is also a component, interstitially and in beds. Other common components of Hawthorn units include phosphate, palygorskite, sepiolite, chert, and dolomite or dolostone.

== Age ==
Period: Neogene
Epoch: Earliest Miocene (Aquitanian) to early Miocene (Burdigalian) in the eastern Florida panhandle, to middle Miocene (Serravallian) in northern Florida, Georgia, and South Carolina, and to earliest Pliocene (Zanclean) in southern Florida, ~23 to ~3.6 mya a period of 19.4 million years
North American land mammal age: Late Arikareean through early Blancan

== Location ==
The Hawthorn Group includes several geologic formations found in southeastern South Carolina, the coastal plain of Georgia, and much of the Florida Peninsula.The Hawthorn Group extends from southeastern South Carolina through the coastal plain of Georgia and the Florida Peninsula to south Florida.

In Florida, the Hawthorn Group encompasses in part the counties of Gilchrist, Levy, Dixie, Citrus, Sumter, Alachua and Marion County. The Hawthorn is also present below undifferentiated sediments (TQu) as well as the Tamiami Formation from Polk County south through Highlands, Glades, Hendry, Dade, Collier, and Monroe County at depths ranging from mean sea level near Polk to below 600 meters in Monroe Co. The Hawthorn overlies Ocala Limestone

== Units ==
- The Arcadia Formation is the lower carbonate layer of the Hawthorn Group in southern Florida.
  - The Tampa Member is the lowest level of the Arcadia Formation in the Tampa Bay area. It is distinguished from other parts of the Arcadia Formation by the low percentage of phosphate present.
  - The Nocatee Member is the lowest part of the Arcadia Formation in southwestern Florida. It is primarily siliciclastic, while the rest of the Arcadia Formation is primarily carbonate.
- The Coosawhatchie Formation is the top member of the Hawthorn Group in southeastern South Carolina and northeastern Georgia.
  - The Charlton Member is the upper part of the Coosawatchie Formation in southern Georgia and northern Florida.
- The Marks Head Formation is the middle member of the Hawthorn Group in southeastern Georgia and northern Florida.
- The Parachucla Formation forms the lower part of the Hawthorn Group in southern Georgia. It grades into the Penney Farms Formation to the south.
- The Peace River Formation was proposed by Scott to include the Bone Valley Formation, the Murdock Station and Bayshore Clay members and other siliciclastic beds of the Tamiami Formation. The Peace River Formation overlies the Arcadia Formation.
- The Penney Farms Formation is the lower part of the Hawthorn Group in northern and central Florida.
- The Statenville Formation is the top of the Hawthorn Group along the Alapaha River near Statenville, Georgia, extending into Columbia and Hamilton counties in Florida.
- The Torreya Formation is in the eastern part of the Florida Panhandle and adjacent southwestern Georgia. It includes the Dogtown and Sopchoppy members.

The Alachua Formation may have resulted from the weathering of Hawthorn Group sediments, intermixed with Pliocene deposits. Scott does not consider it to be part of the Hawthorn Group.

== Paleofauna ==
Reptiles

- Apalone ferox (Florida Softshell Turtle)
- Pseudemys caelata (Pond Turtle)
- Terrapene (Box Turtle)
- Deirochelys (Chicken Turtle)
- Geochelone (Tortoise)
- Alligator mississippiensis (American Alligator)
- †Gavialosuchus americanus or Thecachampsa antiqua (American Crocodile)
- Typhlops (Blind snake)
- Xenodontinae (Mud Snake)
- Heterodon (Hognose Snake)
- Elaphe (Rat Snake)
- Lampropeltis getulus (Kingsnake)
- Nerodia (Water snake)
- Thamnophis (Garter Snake)
- Crotalinae (Lancehead, Rattlesnake)
- Sistrurus (Rattlesnake)

Birds

- Anserinae (Swan)
- Podicipedidae (Grebe)
- Phalacrocoracidae (Cormorant)
- Anhinga grandis (Snakebird)
- Ciconiidae (Stork)
- Phoenicopteridae (Flamingo)
- Ardea (Heron)
- Egretta (Egret)
- Ardeola (Heron)
- Aramidae (Limpkin)
- Gruidae (Crane-like)
- Rallidae (Crakes & Coots)
- Cathartidae (New World Vulture)
- Pandionidae (Osprey)
- Accipitridae (Eagle)
- Passeriformes (Songbird)

Mammals

- †Metaxytherium floridanum (Sea Cow)
- †Gomphotherium (Elephant)
- †Tapirus simpsoni (Tapir)
- †Teleoceras proterum (Rhinoceros)
- †Aphelops malacorhinus (Rhinoceros)
- †Pseudhipparion skinneri (Horse)
- †Hipparion tehonense (Horse)
- †Neohipparion trampasense (Horse)
- †Nannippus westoni (Horse)
- †Hippotherium ingenuum and H. plicatile (Horse)
- †Calippus cerasinus and C. elachistus (Horse)
- †Protohippus gidleyi (Horse)
- Microchiroptera (Microbat)
- †Leptarctus (Mustelidae)
- †Hoplictis (Mustelidae)
- †Plionictis (Mustelidae)
- †Sthenictis lacota (Mustelidae)
- †Arctonasua floridana (Raccoon)
- †Paranasua biradica
- †Leptocyon
- †Epicyon haydeni and E. saevus (Proto-dog)
- †Nimravides galiani (False Saber-tooth cat)
- †Barbourofelis loveorum (False Saber-tooth cat)
- †Antilocaprinae (Antilope)
- †Pseudoceras (Early horse-type ungulate)
- †Yumaceras hamiltoni (Camel-like)
- †Kogiopsis floridana (Whale)
- †Ninoziphius platyrostris (Whale)
- †Goniodelphis hudsoni (Whale)
- †Balaenoptera floridana (Whale)
- †Pomatodelphis bobengia (Whale)
- †Aepycamelus major (Camel)
- †Procamelus grandis (Camel)
- †Hemiauchenia minima (Camel)
- Talpidae (Mole)
- Soricidae (Shrew)
- †Archaeolaginae (Rabbit)
- Sciuridae (Squirrel)
- †Eucastor planus (Beaver)
- Abelmoschomys simpsoni (Vole)
- †Mylagaulus elassos (Horned gopher)

Fish

- †Otodus megalodon (Shark)
- †Pristis aquitanicus (Shark)
- †Cosmopolitodus hastalis (Shark)
- Carcharodon carcharias (Shark)
- †Carcharodon cf. hubbelli (Shark)
- †Carcharodon plicatilis (Shark)
- †Galeocerdo aduncus (Shark)
- †Hemipristis serra (Shark)
- †Myliobatus (Ray)
- Diodon (pufferfish)

== See also ==
- List of fossiliferous stratigraphic units in South Carolina
- Paleontology in South Carolina

== Sources ==
- Huddlestun, Paul F. (1993). "An Overview of the Neogene of Georgia". In Zulio, Victor A.; Harris, W. Burleigh; Scott, Thomas M.; Portell, Roger W. (eds.). The Neogene of Florida and Adjacent Regions: Special Publication 37: Proceedings of the Third Bald Island Conference on Coastal Plains Geology (PDF) (Report). Tallahassee, Florida: Florida Geological Survey. pp. 91–96. Archived from the original on 2023-12-03.
- Scott, Thomas M. (1988). The lithostratigraphy of the Hawthorn Group (Miocene) of Florida: Florida Geological Survey Bulletin 59 (PDF) (Report). Florida Geological Survey.
- Weems, Robert E.; Edwards, Lucy E. (2001). Geology of Oligocene, Miocene, and Younger Deposits in the Coastal Area of Georgia, Bulletin 131 (PDF) (Report). Atlanta, Georgia: Georgia Geologic Survey.
- USGS: Florida Geology
- Paleobiology database: Love Bone Bed Collection
