= Penney Farms Formation =

Geological formation in Florida

- Type: Geological formation

Location
- Region: Florida
- Country: United States

The Penney Farms Formation is a geologic formation in Florida. It preserves fossils from the early Miocene.

== Fossil content ==
=== Invertebrates ===
Crustaceans
Genus	Species	Presence	Material	Notes	Images
Balanus	B. reflexus	Osceola National Forest, Columbia County, Florida.	4 scuta, 1 tergum, 2 shells.	A balanid barnacle also found in the Parachucla Formation.	
Concavus	C. crassostricola	Osceola National Forest, Columbia County, Florida.	2 scuta, 4 compartmental plates.	A balanid barnacle also found in the Parachucla Formation.	
Solidobalanus	S. sp. indet.	Osceola National Forest, Columbia County, Florida.	One scutum, 6 compartmental plates.	An archaeobalanid barnacle also found in the Parachucla Formation.	

== See also ==
- List of fossiliferous stratigraphic units in Florida
