= Bone Valley Formation =

Geologic formation in Florida, United States

- Stratigraphic range: Middle Miocene to Early Pliocene
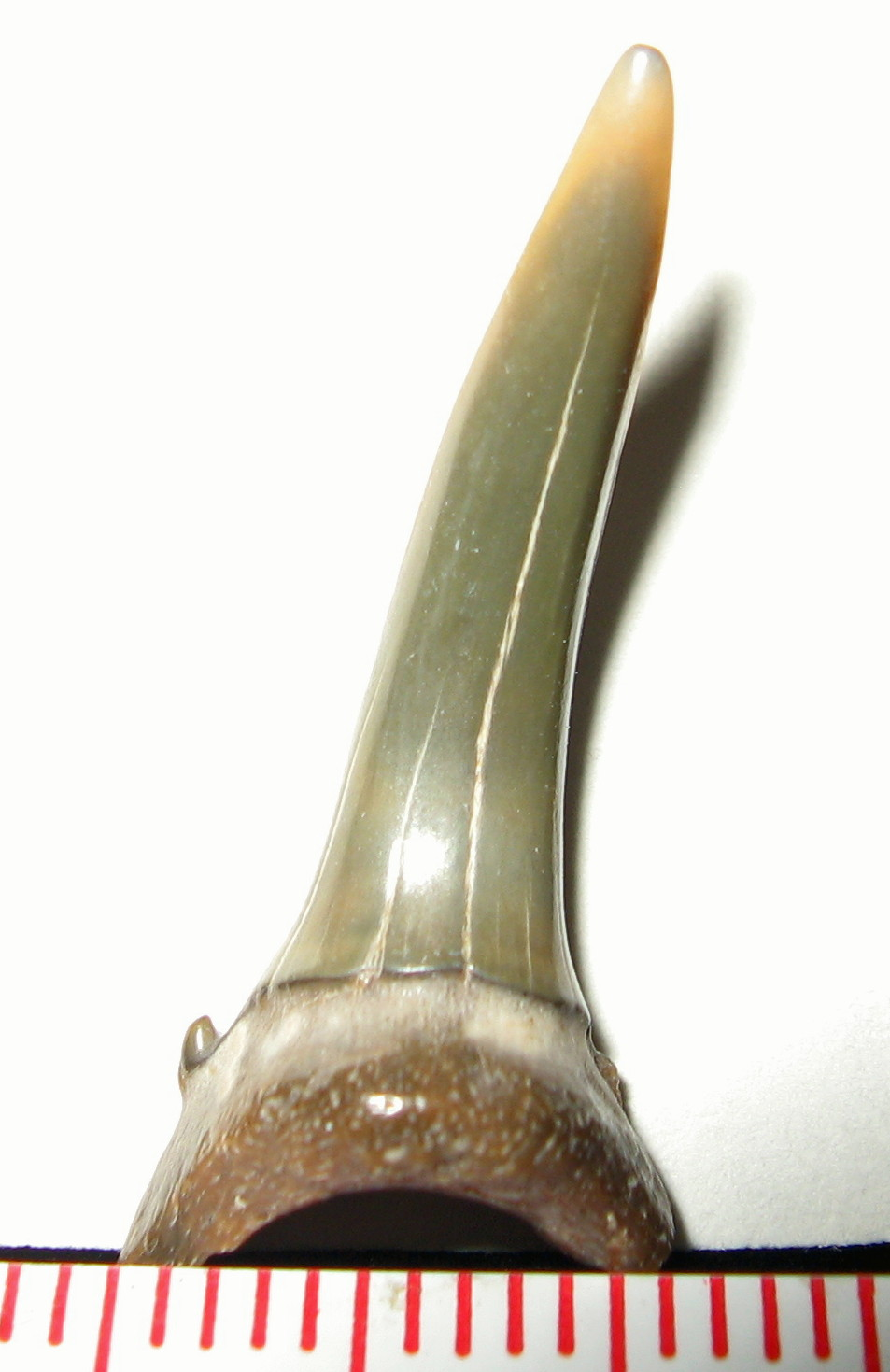
- Fossil from the Bone Valley Formation
- Type: Formation
- Unit of: Hawthorn Group
- Underlies: Pleistocene sand
- Overlies: Peace River Formation
- Thickness: 30 metres (100 ft)

Lithology
- Primary: Sand, marl, clay
- Other: Phosphorite pebbles, chert

Location
- Region: Florida
- Country: United States

Type section
- Named for: Bone Valley, Florida
- Named by: G.C. Matson and F.G. Clapp, 1909
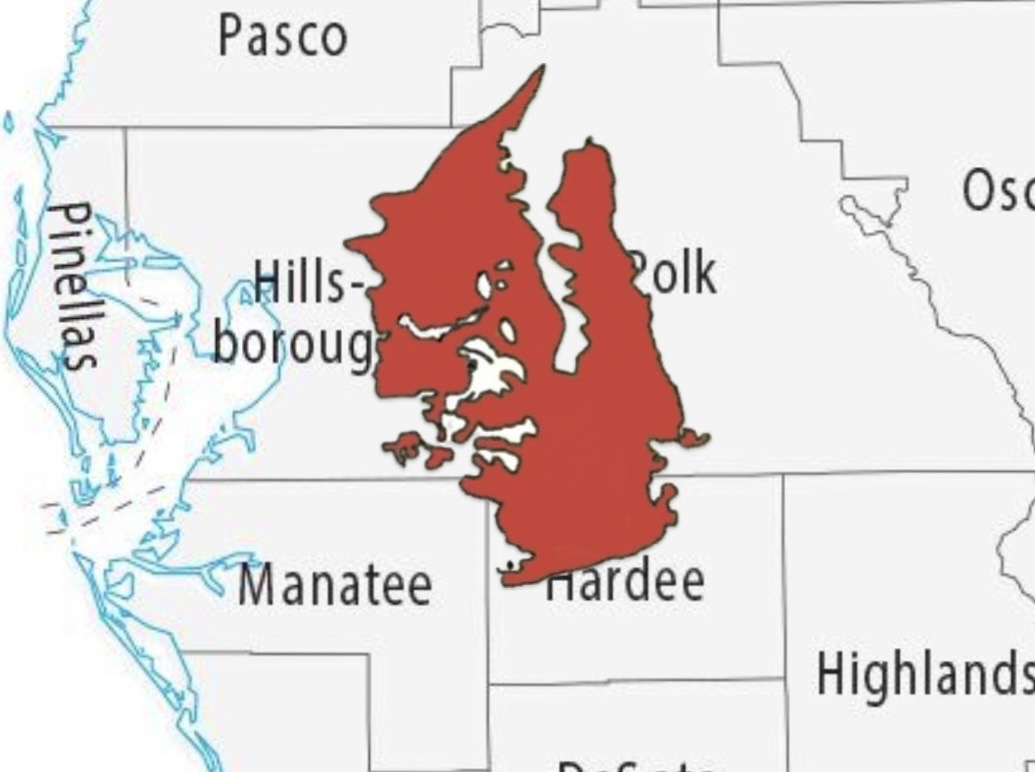

The Bone Valley Formation is a geologic formation in Florida. It is sometimes classified as the upper member of the Peace River Formation of the Hawthorn Group. It contains economically important phosphorite deposits that are mined in west-central Florida, as well as rich assemblages of vertebrate fossils.

== Lithology ==
The Bone Valley Formation consists of sandy marl that contains pebbles of phosphate and chert, fragments of bone, and other organic remains. The finer grained material is soft and plastic when wet, but hardens when dry.

== Age ==
The Bone Valley Formation contains mammal fossils and its age has been determined by mammalian biostratigraphy.
Period: Neogene
Epoch: Middle Miocene to Early Pliocene
North American land mammal age: Barstovian to Hemphillian

== Paleontology ==
The Bone Valley Formation includes a diverse assemblage of vertebrate fossils. These include remains of sea turtles, equines, felines, peccaries, and others.

== See also ==
- Bone Valley
- List of fossiliferous stratigraphic units in Florida
