= Florentiamyidae =

Florentiamyidae Temporal range: Early Oligocene–Middle Miocene

Scientific classification
- Kingdom: Animalia
- Phylum: Chordata
- Class: Mammalia
- Order: Rodentia
- Superfamily: Geomyoidea
- Family: †Florentiamyidae; A.E. Wood, 1936

Genera
- Ecclesimus; Fanimus; Florentiamys; Hitonkala; Kirkomys; Sanctimus

Extinct family of rodents

Florentiamyidae is a family of extinct rodents from North America. They are part of the Superfamily Geomyoidea according to R. L. Carroll 1988. They are known to have existed 33.3 to 15.97 mya. They are known from the Miocene of United States, Harrisonian of United States, Arikareean of United States, and Oligocene of Canada. Four fossil specimens from the Arikareean were obtained at the John Day Fossil Beds in Oregon.
