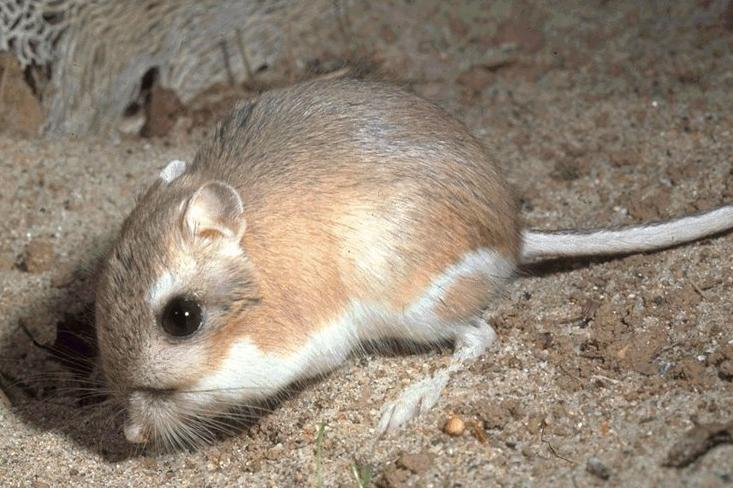
- Kangaroo rat

Scientific classification
- Kingdom: Animalia
- Phylum: Chordata
- Class: Mammalia
- Order: Rodentia
- Suborder: Castorimorpha
- Superfamily: Geomyoidea; Bonaparte, 1845

Families
- †Eomyidae †Heliscomyidae †Florentiamyidae; Geomyidae; Heteromyidae

= Geomyoidea =

Geomyoidea Temporal range: Early Eocene - Recent

Superfamily of rodents

Geomyoidea is a superfamily of rodent that contains the pocket gophers (Geomyidae), the kangaroo rats and mice (Heteromyidae), and their fossil relatives.

== Characteristics ==
Although dissimilar in overall appearance, gophers have been united with kangaroo rats into a common superfamily for a considerable time. The superfamily Geomyoidea is among the few superfamilial relationships in rodents that is not subject to much controversy. Overall morphology, the fossil record, molecular analyses, and biogeography all support this relationship.

Geomyoids are most noticeably characterized by the position of the infraorbital canal. Unlike all other rodents who have the opening of the infraorbital canal facing forward, geomyoids have an infraorbital canal that faces to the side. Instead of passing through the zygoma, the infraorbital canal of geomyoids has moved to the side of the snout. This condition is so pronounced and the snout so narrow in heteromyids that the infraorbital canals from either side connect. Essentially, if the skull of a heteromyid is viewed from the side, the viewer can see directly through it.

Modern geomyoids are mostly restricted to North America, but some representatives have extended their range into South America since the Great American Interchange. Fossil taxa are known from throughout Laurasia.

== Relation to other rodents ==
Geomyoids have been considered to be either sciuromorphous or myomorphous depending on the authority. The masseter muscle does not pass through the infraorbital canal; it cannot due to the position of the canal. Some authorities consider the geomyoids related to squirrels, beavers, and mountain beavers on this basis.

The masseter muscle does attach directly behind the zygomatic arch in a manner very different from sciuromorphs. Some authorities consider geomyoids myomorphs based on this feature. This suggests they may be related to mice, jerboas, and perhaps dormice.

== Taxonomy ==
The family †Eomyidae is alternatively referred to as a member of the superfamily Geomyoidea or as a separate superfamily (†Eomyoidea) within the shared infraorder "Geomorpha" (which is also used for a genus of shield-bugs). †Florentiamyidae and †Heliscomyidae are usually placed within the superfamily Geomyoidea regardless of if eomyids are treated as a separate superfamily or not (Korth et al., 1991). McKenna and Bell (1997) do not recognize heliscomyids as a distinct family, placing the one or two heliscomyid genera in Geomyoidea incertae sedis. Sometimes the pocket gophers and heteromyids are placed as separate subfamilies within a single family (Geomyidae). These subfamilies are Geomyinae and Heteromyinae respectively.

- Superfamily Geomyoidea
  - Genus †Caribeomys incertae sedis
  - Genus †Griphomys incertae sedis
  - Genus †Meliakrouniomys incertae sedis
  - Family †Eomyidae
  - Family †Heliscomyidae
  - Family †Florentiamyidae
  - Family Geomyidae - pocket gophers
  - Family Heteromyidae - kangaroo rats and mice, pocket mice

Cladogram showing interrelationships among geomyoid families following Korth et al. (1991):

- Geomyoidea
  - †Eomyidae
  - - †Heliscomyidae
    - - †Florentiamyidae
      - - Geomyidae (pocket gophers)
        - Heteromyidae (kangaroo rats and mice, pocket mice)
