= Ocala Limestone =

Late Eocene geologic formation

- Stratigraphic range: Eocene
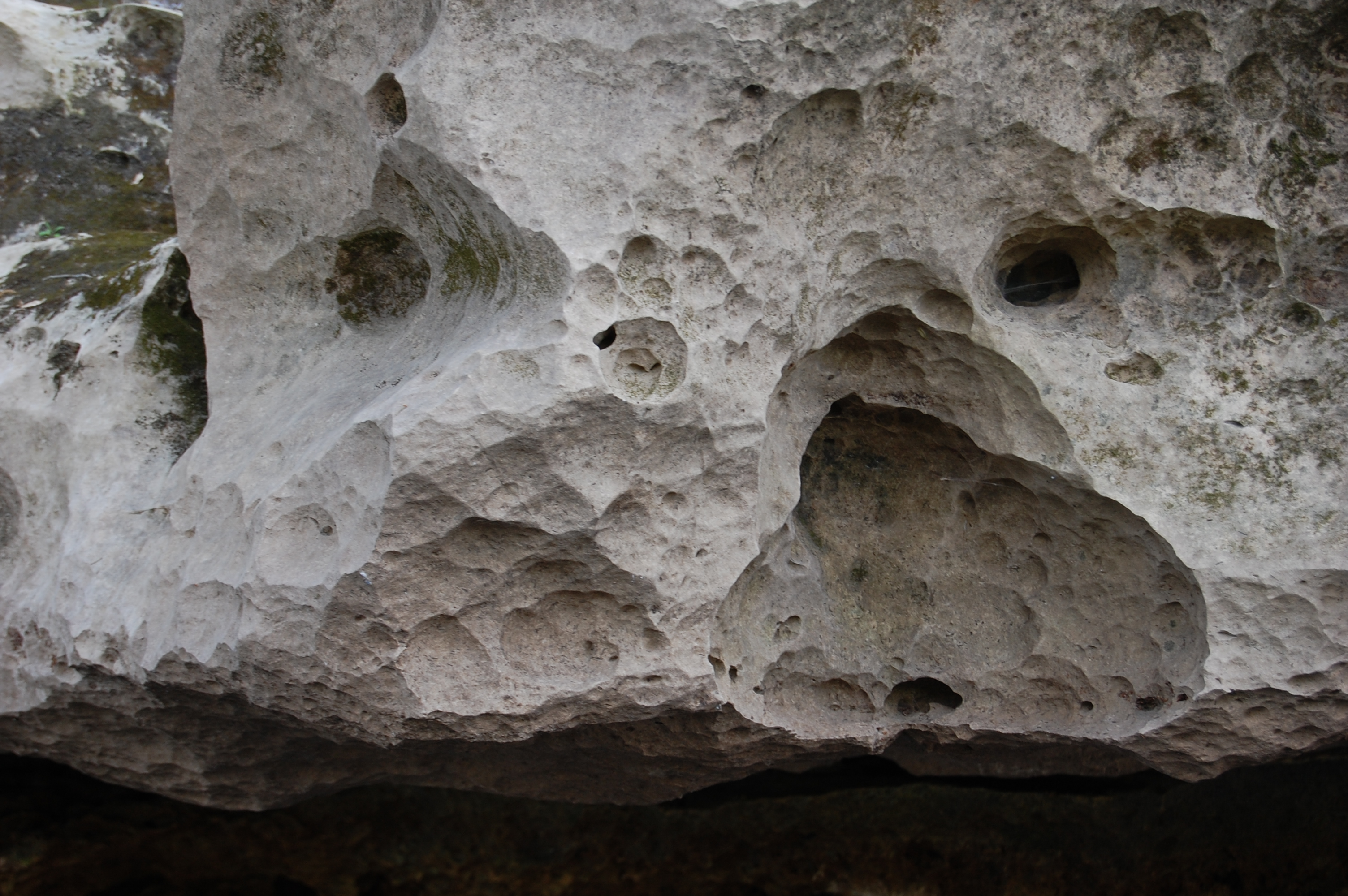
- Type: Geological formation
- Underlies: Suwannee Limestone (Oligocene)
- Overlies: Avon Park Formation
- Thickness: Lafayette-Sumter counties

Lithology
- Primary: limestone and dolomite

Location
- Region: North Florida
- Country: United States

Type section
- Named for: Ocala, Florida (city)

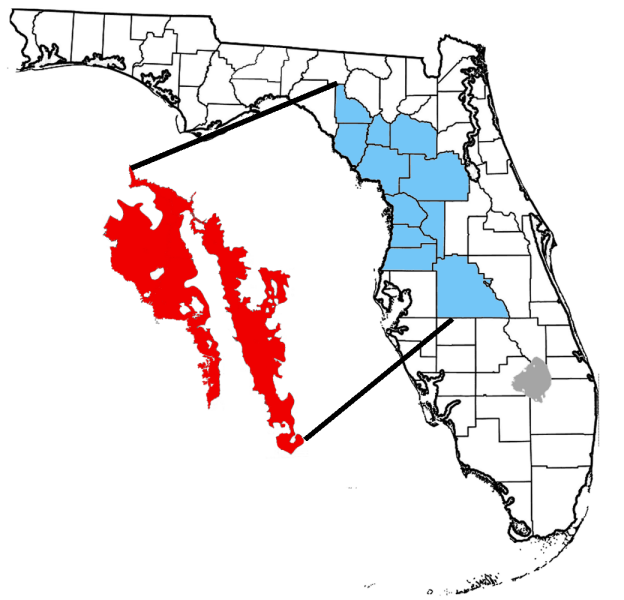
Extent and location of Ocala Limestone.

The Ocala Limestone is a late Eocene geologic formation of exposed limestones near Ocala, Marion County, Florida.

== Age ==
Period: Paleogene
Epoch: Late Eocene
Faunal stage: Late Clarkforkian through early Orellan
Absolute Age: ~55.8 to ~33.9 mya, calculates to a period of approximately 21.9 million years

== Location ==
The Ocala Limestone is at or near the surface within the Ocala Karst District located in west-central to the northwestern part of the peninsula. It is also within the Dougherty Plain District in the north-central panhandle where it easily forms karsts. These karsts often have several feet (meters) of relief which dramatically influence the topography of the Ocala Karst District and the Dougherty Plain District. The area is abundant with disappearing streams and springs.

== Composition ==
Formerly a geologic group, Ocala Limestone was downgraded to formation status by T.M. Scott in 1991. The Ocala Limestone consists of almost pure limestones with occasional dolomites. It can be subdivided into both lower and upper facies with the lower facies composed of a whitish to cream-colored, fine to medium grained, poorly to moderately hard, fossil rich grainstone and packstone. The upper Ocala is white and somewhat weak and poorly sorted. Its extremely fossil rich grainstone, packstone and wackestone and some chert is common in the upper facies. Its permeable and transmissive properties allow it to form a vital portion of the Floridan Aquifer.

== Overlay ==
The Ocala Limestone overlies the Avon Park Formation and forms part of the Floridan Aquifer System. (USGS)

== Fossils ==
- Foraminifers, Lepidocyclina
- Echinoids
- Bryozoans
- Mollusks
- Rare vertebrates
