= Ocala Platform =

- Stratigraphic range: Miocene
- Type: Geological structure

Lithology
- Primary: Carbonate

Location
- Region: North Florida
- Country: United States
- Extent: Wakulla to Pasco County

Type section
- Named for: Ocala, Florida
- Named by: T. M. Scott, 1988

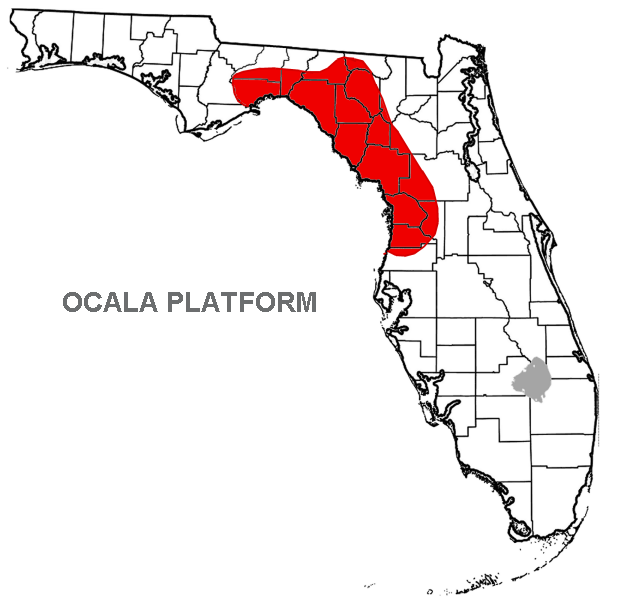
Location of the Ocala Platform within Florida (in red).

The Ocala Platform or Ocala Uplift is a geologic feature, a structural high, and a northwest-trending uplift paralleling the Peninsular Arch along the west coast of Florida.

== Age ==
Period: Neogene
Epoch: Early Late Oligocene through Pliocene
Faunal stage: Chattian through early Blancan ~23.03 to ~2.588 mya, calculates to a period of 20.442 million years

== Origin ==
The Ocala Platform was originally named by Hopkins in 1920. Due to the uncertainty of its creation, T. M. Scott used the term "platform" in place of "uplift" or "arch". This geologic feature was described as a gentle flexure developed in Tertiary sediments with a northwest–southeast trending crest by Vernon in 1951.

The Ocala Platform was created during two episodes. The first occurred during the Late Oligocene through Early Miocene and the second episode occurred in Early Pliocene and into Late Pleistocene according to Williams et al. This movement created the feature referred to as the Ocala Uplift. It has been suggested that the uplift was a pre-Hawthorn Group occurrence (Pirkle & Brooks 1959a).

Sediments of the Hawthorn Group are thought to have been deposited across the Ocala Platform (Scott, 1981a; Scott, 1988). Erosion after the Miocene has removed sediments of the Hawthorn Group from much of the crest of the Ocala Platform. This has exposed Eocene carbonates which could confuse dating. (Cooke, 1945; Espenshade and Spencer, 1963; Brooks, 1966; and Scott, 1981b).

== Structure ==
Fluctuating sea levels during the Neogene has created three marine terraces.

- Wicomico terrace (70–100 feet)
- Sunderland/Okefenokee terrace (100–175 feet)
- Coharie terrace (170–215 feet)
