= Paleontology in Georgia (U.S. state) =

Paleontological research occurring within or conducted by Georgia

The location and boundaries of the U.S. state of Georgia

Paleontology in Georgia refers to paleontological research occurring within or conducted by people from the U.S. state of Georgia. During the early part of the Paleozoic, Georgia was largely covered by seawater. Although no major Paleozoic discoveries have been uncovered in Georgia, the local fossil record documents a great diversity of ancient life in the state. Inhabitants of Georgia's early Paleozoic sea included corals, stromatolites, and trilobites. During the Carboniferous local sea levels dropped and a vast complex of richly vegetated delta formed in the state. These swampy deltas were home to early tetrapods which left behind footprints that would later fossilize. Little is known of Triassic Georgia and the Jurassic is absent altogether from the state's rock record. During the Cretaceous, however, southern Georgia was covered by a sea that was home to invertebrates and fishes. On land, the tree Araucaria grew, and dinosaurs inhabited the state. Southern Georgia remained submerged by shallow seawater into the ensuing Paleogene and Neogene periods of the Cenozoic era. These seas were home to small coral reefs and a variety of other marine invertebrates. By the Pleistocene the state was mostly dry land covered in forests and grasslands home to mammoths and giant ground sloths. Local coal mining activity has a history of serendipitous Carboniferous-aged fossil discoveries. Another major event in Georgian paleontology was a 1963 discovery of Pleistocene fossils in Bartow County. Shark teeth are the Georgia state fossil.

== Prehistory ==
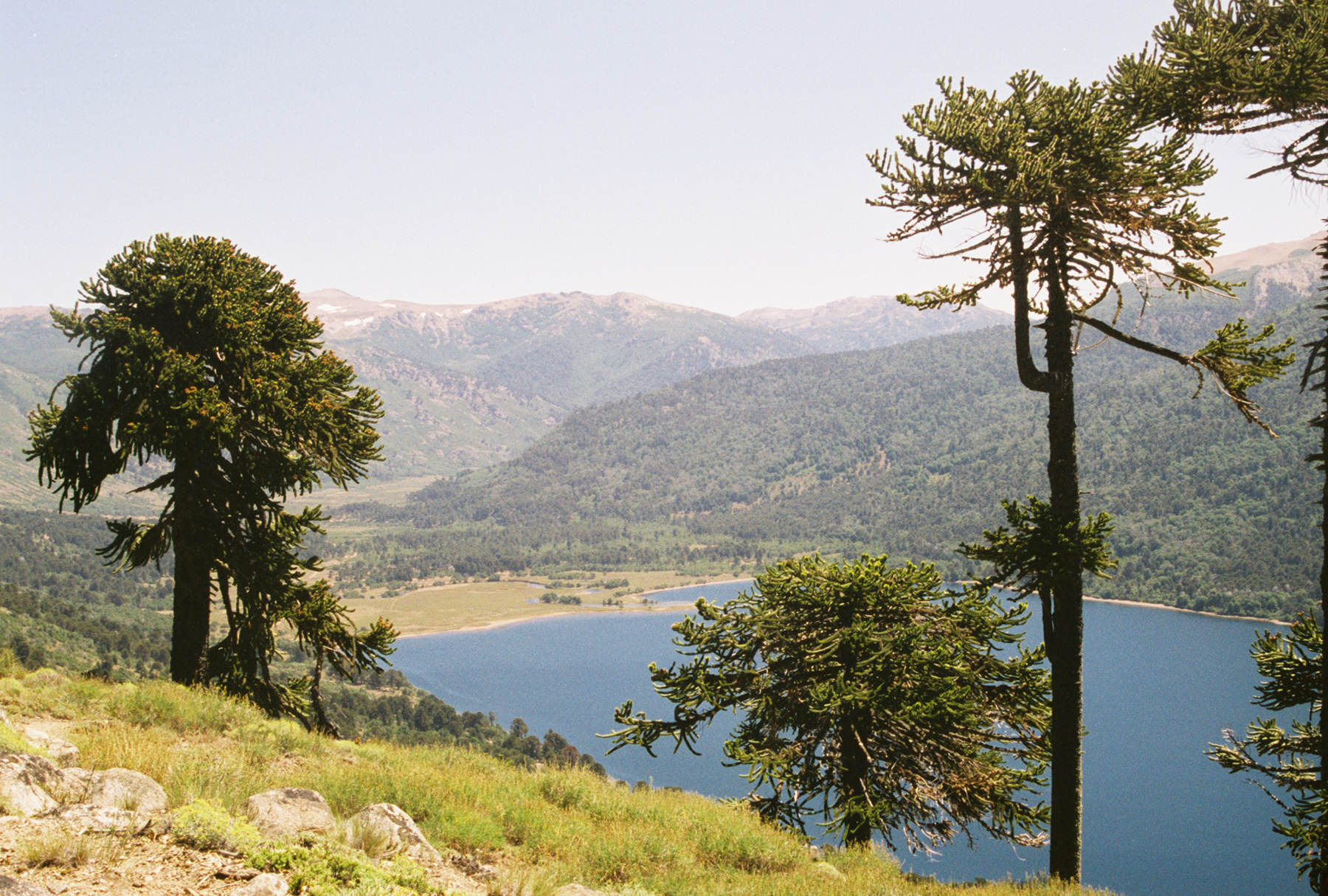
Living Araucaria.

No Precambrian fossils are known from Georgia. As such, the state's fossils record does not begin until the Paleozoic. Although no major discoveries have been uncovered in Georgian Paleozoic the fossil record documents a great diversity of ancient life in the state. During the Cambrian the state was covered by a warm shallow sea. Corals, stromatolites, and trilobites lived in the state at this time. Similar conditions and wildlife remained in place during the early part of the ensuing Ordovician period. During the later part of the period broad expansive of tidal flat environments formed in the state. Throughout the ensuing Silurian period northern Georgia remained submerged by the shallow sea. However, during the Devonian sea levels rose, covering the state in relatively deep water. The ensuing Carboniferous period is also known as "age of amphibians" or the "age of coal swamps". The early Carboniferous saw a return to shallow water conditions in Georgia. As the Carboniferous progressed vast delta formed beside the sea. The richly vegetated swamps that grew across these deltas in the northwestern part of the state left behind great coal beds. The dense vegetation of these swamps also left behind many fossils. Tetrapods of this age left footprints that would later fossilize. During the Permian, local sediments were being eroded away rather than deposited, so there are no rocks of this age in which fossils could have been preserved. Other Paleozoic inhabitants of Georgia included blastoids, bryozoans, cephalopods, crinoids, and gastropods.

The geologic record of the Triassic is sparse in Georgia and the Jurassic is absent altogether from the state's rock record. During the Cretaceous, however, southern Georgia was covered by seawater. This sea was home to clams, fish, oysters, and burrowing shrimp. The tree Araucaria gladenensis grew in Georgia during the Cretaceous. The state's coastal habitats were home to crocodilians like the giant Deinosuchus and dinosaurs. Local dinosaurs included Hadrosaurs, ornithomimosaurs and tyrannosaurs.

Southern Georgia remained submerged by shallow seawater into the ensuing Paleogene and Neogene periods of the Cenozoic era. These seas were home to relatively small coral reefs. During the Paleocene, Georgia was home to foraminiferans, mollusks, and sea urchins. The mollusks were preserved as casts and the urchins left behind fossil spines that are found in the middle part of the state. Eocene life in Georgia included pectens, oysters, and a wide variety of microscopic life. Various fossil whales are known, such as Georgiacetus, Cynthiacetus, and Basilosaurus. Sea urchins continued to persist in the state. Plant fossils have also been discovered in local Eocene rocks. Later, in the Oligocene epoch Georgia was home to animals like corals as well as a variety of pelecypods (at least 13) and gastropods (at least 11). The most common Miocene aged fossils are gastropods and pelecypods. Most of Georgia was dry land by the time of the Quaternary period. Local sea levels rose and fell significantly in time with the expansion and thawing of glaciers farther north in the continent. Georgia's terrestrial environments included forests and grasslands. These were home to creatures like mammoths, mastodons and giant ground sloths. An unusually large species of chipmunk called Tamias aristus also lived in the state during the Pleistocene.

== History ==
Since the start of the Industrial Revolution, coal mining in Georgia has led to many Carboniferous fossil trackway discoveries. These discoveries frequently occur when the excavation of coal mines removes the rock underlying the trackway, leaving it exposed on the tunnel's ceiling. Several significant paleontological events occurred during the early 1960s. In 1961, unusually large blastoids were found near the state's border with Alabama on a Floyd County farm. In the fall of 1963, Warren Moore and his family discovered some fossil bones and molluscs in a limestone quarry at Ladds, in Bartow County. They reported their find to Shorter College. It turned out that the Moores had discovered an entirely new source of Pleistocene fossils. Shorter College collaborated with the Smithsonian on an excavation. The Moores themselves remained very active participants in uncovering the fossils, among others like local public school teachers, and the staff and students of Shorter College. The dig uncovered about forty different kinds of vertebrate animals. A notable discovery was a new kind of large fossil chipmunk called Tamias aristus, which is related to a previously documented Georgian species.

== Paleontologists ==
- Robert W. Frey
- Susan Goldstein
- Steven M. Holland
- Anthony J. Martin
- Jenny McGuire
- Cameron Muskelly
- David Schwimmer
- Christy Visaggi
- Sally E. Walker
- Candice "Nkki" Simon
- Robert K. MacAfee
- Katey Smith

== Natural history museums ==
- Fernbank Museum of Natural History, Atlanta
- Georgia Museum of Natural History, Athens
- Georgia Southern University Museum, Statesboro
- Tellus Science Museum, Cartersville

== See also ==
- Paleontology in Alabama
- Paleontology in Florida
- Paleontology in North Carolina
- Paleontology in South Carolina
- Paleontology in Tennessee
