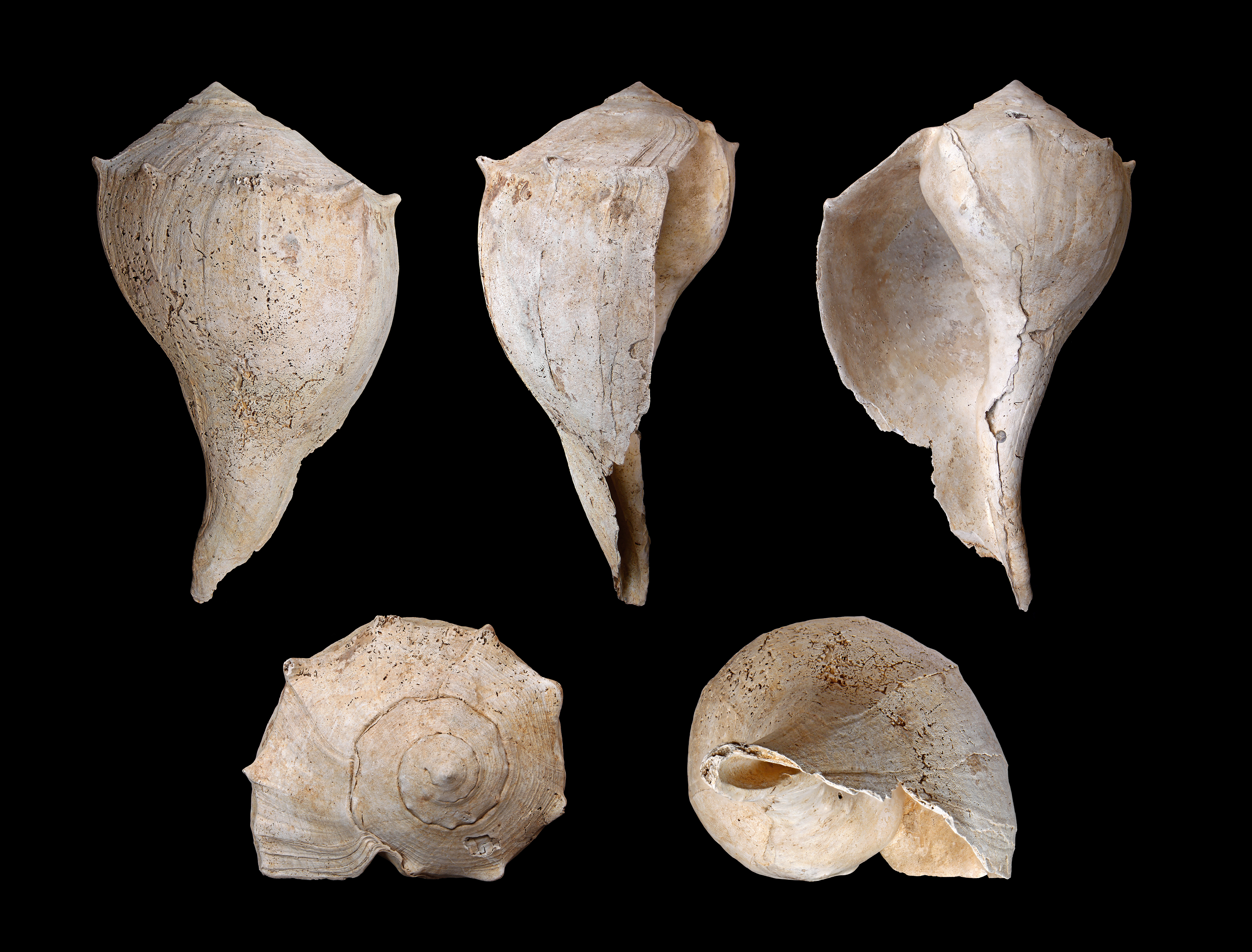
- A fossil shell of Busycon contrarium

Scientific classification
- Kingdom: Animalia
- Phylum: Mollusca
- Class: Gastropoda
- Subclass: Caenogastropoda
- Order: Neogastropoda
- Superfamily: Buccinoidea
- Family: Busyconidae
- Subfamily: Busyconinae
- Genus: Busycon; Röding, 1798

Type species
- Busycon muricatum Röding, 1798

Species
- See text

Synonyms
- Fulgur Montfort, 1810

= Busycon =

Genus of busyconinin gastropods

Busycon is a genus of very large edible sea snails in the subfamily Busyconinae. These snails are commonly known in the United States as whelks or Busycon whelks. Less commonly they are loosely, and somewhat misleadingly, called "conchs".

Busycon comes from the Greek bousykon meaning large fig, from bous meaning cow and sykon meaning fig.

== Shell description ==
Shells of species in this genus can grow to a length of 40 cm.

The shell is pyriform. The body whorl is large, nodulous or spinose. The spire is very short. The aperture is large and subtriangular. The siphonal canal is open, elongated, entire at the fore part. The inner lip is concave, with a single fold anteriorly. The outer lip is internally striated.

The shells are generally a solid cream, light grey or tan in color, however the shell of the lightning whelk is marked with brown and white streaks.

The shell of individuals can sometimes vary quite widely in coloration and sculpture.

== Behavior ==
Busycon whelks are scavengers and carnivores, equipped with a proboscis tipped with a file-like radula used to bore holes through the shells of barnacles, clams, crabs, and lobsters. They have a large, muscular foot with which they hold their victims. Small sharks, gulls, crabs, and other gastropods are known to feed upon them.

The knobbed whelk, Busycon carica, is the second-largest species, growing up to 30 cm long. They have tubercles (spines) along the shoulder. They open clams with their muscular foot and insert their long proboscis to digest the flesh. The knobbed whelk is a common predator of the foreshore mudflats as far offshore as 50 m.

== Eggs ==
Strings of Busycon whelk egg capsules commonly wash ashore and desiccate, becoming brittle. These objects are sometimes called mermaid's necklaces because they resemble a large necklace strung with medallion-shaped egg pouches. Each pouch of the string contains numerous protoconchs (baby whelks), similar in appearance to adults but with fewer whorls and less sculpture.

== Human use ==
When used for cooking in the United States, busycon whelks are sometimes called scungilli, an Italian-American adaptation of the Neapolitan sconciglio which means the meat of a (usually edible) sea snail.

== Species ==
The genus Busycon contains the following species:

- Busycon carica (Gmelin, 1791) - Knobbed whelk
- Busycon contrarium (Conrad, 1840) †

Species brought into synonymy

- Busycon (Sinistrofulgur) aspinosum Hollister, 1958: synonym of Sinistrofulgur sinistrum (Hollister, 1958)
- Busycon (Sinistrofulgur) perversum (Linnaeus, 1758): synonym of Sinistrofulgur perversum (Linnaeus, 1758)
- Busycon (Sinistrofulgur) sinistrum Hollister, 1958: synonym of Sinistrofulgur sinistrum (Hollister, 1958)
- Busycon amoenum Conrad, 1875: synonym of Brachysycon amoenum (Conrad, 1875) †
- Busycon blakei Conrad, 1855 †: synonym of Pseudoperissolax blakei (Conrad, 1855) †
- Busycon candelabrum Lamarck, 1816 - Splendid whelk: synonym of Lindafulgur candelabrum (Lamarck, 1816)
- Busycon coarctatum (Sowerby I, 1825): synonym of Busycoarctum coarctatum (G.B. Sowerby I, 1825)
- Busycon laeostomum Kent, 1982 - Snow whelk: synonym of Sinistrofulgur laeostomum (Kent, 1982)
- Busycon lindajoyceae Petuch, 1991 †: synonym of Lindafulgur lindajoyceae (Petuch, 1991) †
- Busycon lyonsi Petuch, 1987: synonym of Lindafulgur lyonsi (Petuch, 1987)
- Busycon muricatum Röding, 1798: synonym of Busycon carica (Gmelin, 1791)
- Busycon perversum - Lightning whelk: synonym of Sinistrofulgur perversum (Linnaeus, 1758)
- Busycon plagosum Conrad, 1862: synonym of Fulguropsis plagosa (Conrad, 1863)
- Busycon pulleyi - Prickly whelk: synonym of Sinistrofulgur pulleyi (Hollister, 1958)
- Busycon sinistrum Hollister, 1958: synonym of Sinistrofulgur sinistrum (Hollister, 1958)

The following species have been moved from Busycon to the genus Busycotypus

- Busycotypus canaliculatus (Linnaeus, 1758) Channeled whelk. Busycotypus canaliculatus, is slightly smaller than the knobbed whelk, and has a smooth shell with a deep square channel which is continuous on all the whorls, just below the suture of the shell.
