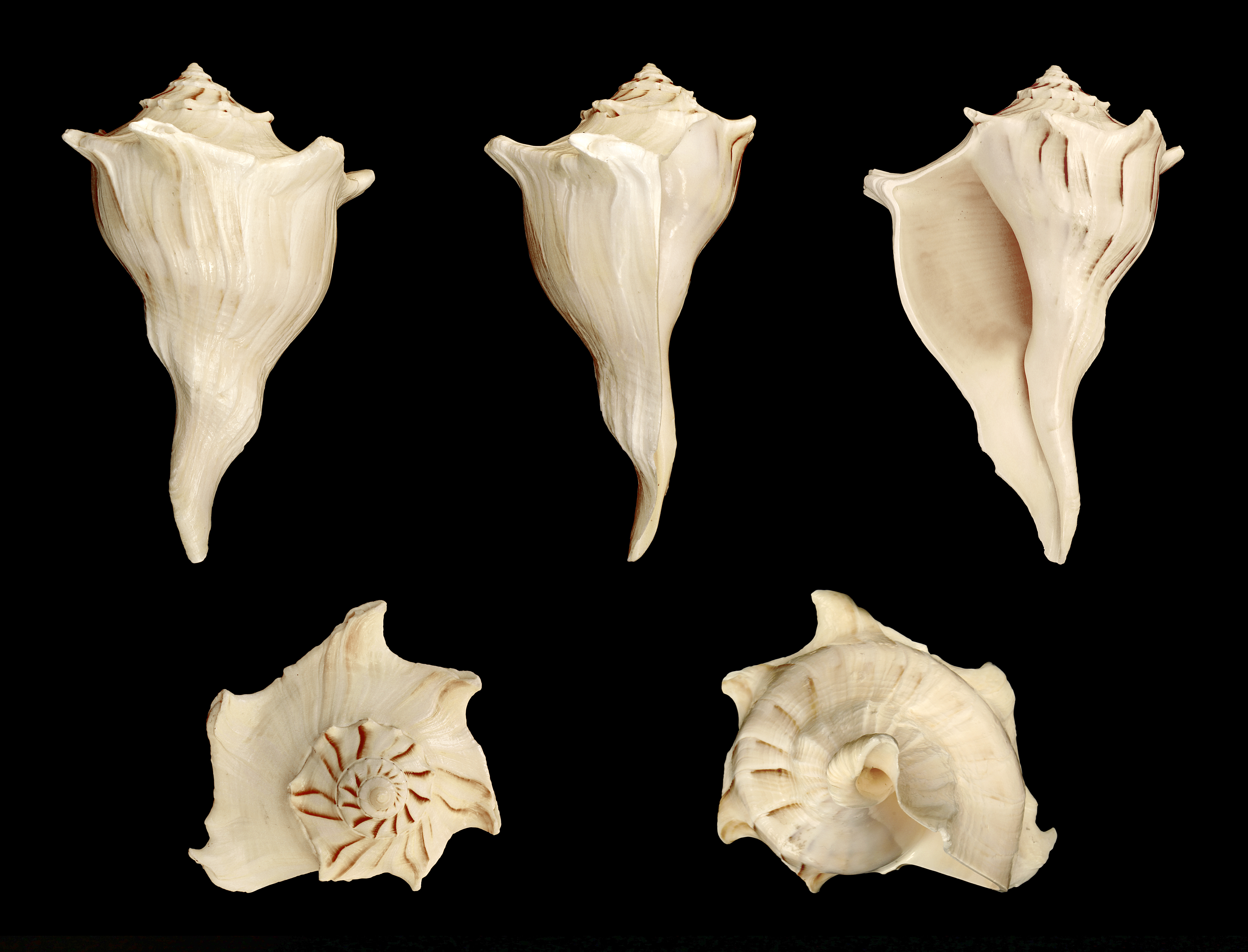
- 5 views of a shell of Sinistrofulgur perversum

Scientific classification
- Kingdom: Animalia
- Phylum: Mollusca
- Class: Gastropoda
- Subclass: Caenogastropoda
- Order: Neogastropoda
- Superfamily: Buccinoidea
- Family: Busyconidae
- Subfamily: Busyconinae
- Genus: Sinistrofulgur; Hollister, 1958

Type species
- Busycon sinistrum Hollister, 1958

Species
- See text

Synonyms
- Busycon (Sinistrofulgur) Hollister, 1958

= Sinistrofulgur =

Genus of gastropods

Sinistrofulgur is a genus of large sea snails with left-handed shell-coiling, marine gastropod mollusks in the subfamily Busyconinae.

== Taxonomy ==
The taxonomy of sinistral busyconids has been subject to several disputes, including at what rank to recognize them as distinct from their sister taxon, Busycon carica, and how many species are represented.

Sinistral busyconids were historically included in the genus Busycon. In 1958, Hollister proposed the subgenus Sinistrofulgur for the group. Petuch elevated Sinistrofulgur to genus rank in 1994, although some other authors have continued including these snails in the genus Busycon.

Sinistral busyconids were historically included in the species Busycon contrarium, but this name (now Sinistrofulgur contrarium) is now restricted to a small fossil species. Hollister recognized four species: B. sinistrum, found between Cape Hatteras, North Carolina and the Florida Keys, as well as off the Yucatan Peninsula east of the Bay of Campeche; B. perversum, endemic to the Bay of Campeche; B. pulleyi, native to the western Gulf of Mexico from the northern coast of Mexico to Breton Sound in Louisiana; and B. aspinosum, at the time only known from Longboat Key on the gulf coast of Florida. Based on genetic data, Wise et al. (2004) recognized only one extant species of sinistral busyconid, B. perversum, with three subspecies: B. perversum perversum found off the Yucatan Peninsula, B. perversum sinistrum found in the northern Gulf of Mexico, and B. perversum laeostomum found on the Atlantic coast of Florida. In 2015, Petuch et al. recognized four extant species based on conchological differences: B. perversum, B. pulleyi, B. sinistrum, and B. laeostomum.

=== Species ===
- †Sinistrofulgur contrarium (Conrad, 1840)
- Sinistrofulgur laeostomum (Kent, 1982)
- Sinistrofulgur perversum (Linnaeus, 1758)
- Sinistrofulgur pulleyi (Hollister, 1958)
- Sinistrofulgur sinistrum (Hollister, 1958)

== Description ==
Sinistrofulgur species attain large sizes. The largest specimen reported of S. sinistrum was 375 millimetres (14.8 in) long.

== Human use ==
Artifacts made of sinistral busyconid shells are abundant in the archaeological record, and include beads, cups, gorgets, pendants, and earplugs, among other things.
