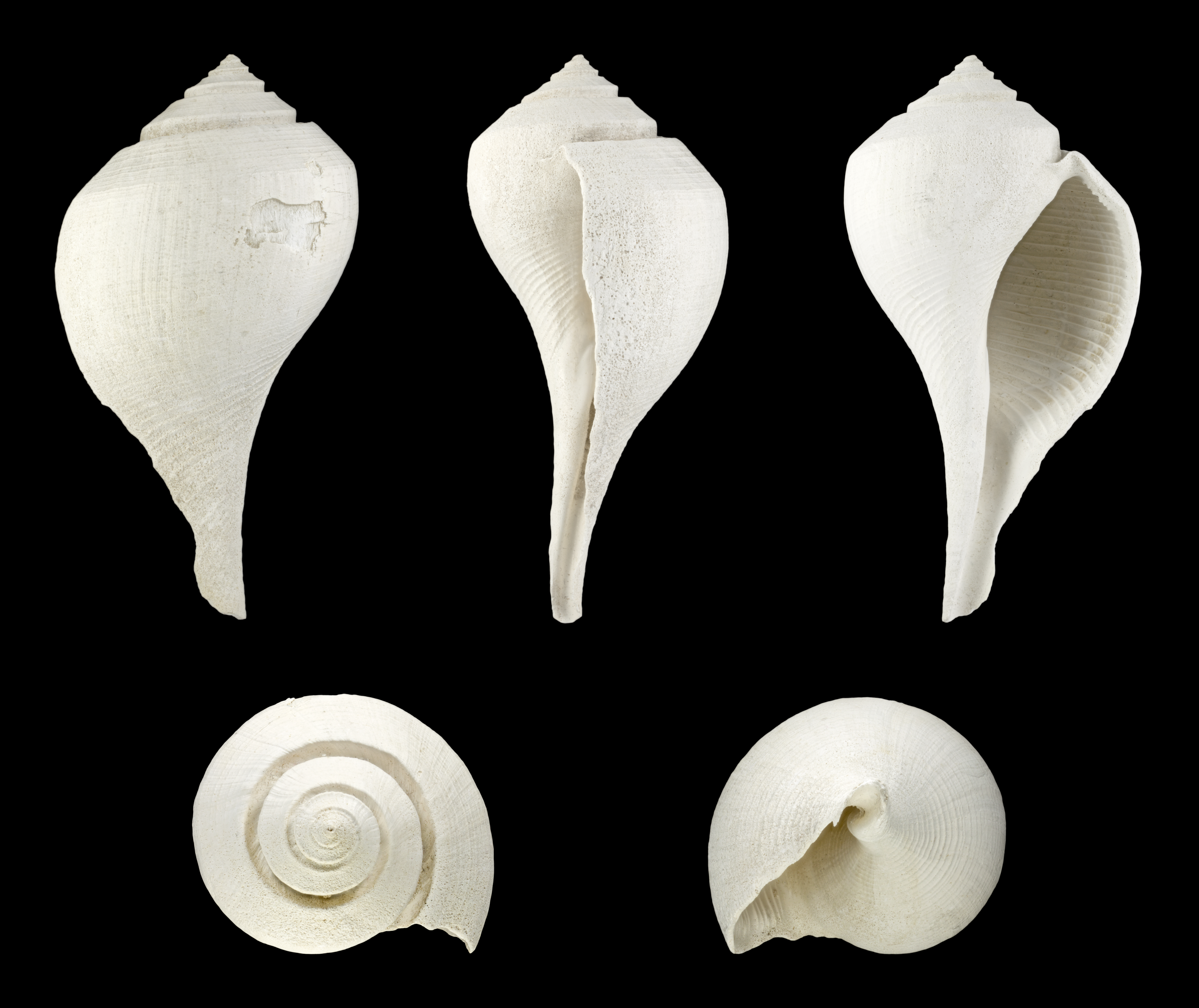
- A shell from a pear whelk

Scientific classification
- Kingdom: Animalia
- Phylum: Mollusca
- Class: Gastropoda
- Subclass: Caenogastropoda
- Order: Neogastropoda
- Family: Busyconidae
- Genus: Fulguropsis
- Species: F. spirata

Binomial name
- Fulguropsis spirata (Lamarck, 1816)

Synonyms
- Pyrula spirata Busycotypus spiratus

= Fulguropsis spirata =

Fulguropsis spirata Temporal range: Pleistocene–Recent

Species of sea snail

Fulguropsis spirata, commonly known as pear whelk, is a species of sea snail, a marine gastropod mollusk in the family Busyconidae, the busycon whelks. The species is also occasionally referred to as the Gulf pear whelk to differentiate it from other Fulguropsis species which are also referred to as pear whelks. It is an edible mollusc found in areas from the Caribbean to the Western Gulf of Mexico. The species was previously thought to range through the entire Gulf of Mexico down the Florida Peninsula and as far north as North Carolina in the Atlantic. The species is generally not found East of the Mississippi Delta, and any Fulguropsis found Eastward from said delta are most likely of the species Fulguropsis pyruloides. As a result many records of F. pyruloides from the aforementioned regions are falsely labelled as F. spirata.

Pear welks can reach 15 cm (5.9 in). The shell is thin, usually with a long siphonal canal and a short, flattened spire. The color variations usually have a cream background, but some can have similar coloration to the lightning whelk with axial brown streaks. The egg case in this species resemble those of the lightning whelk and the knobbed whelk but are smaller, thinner, and bear spikes around the edges.
