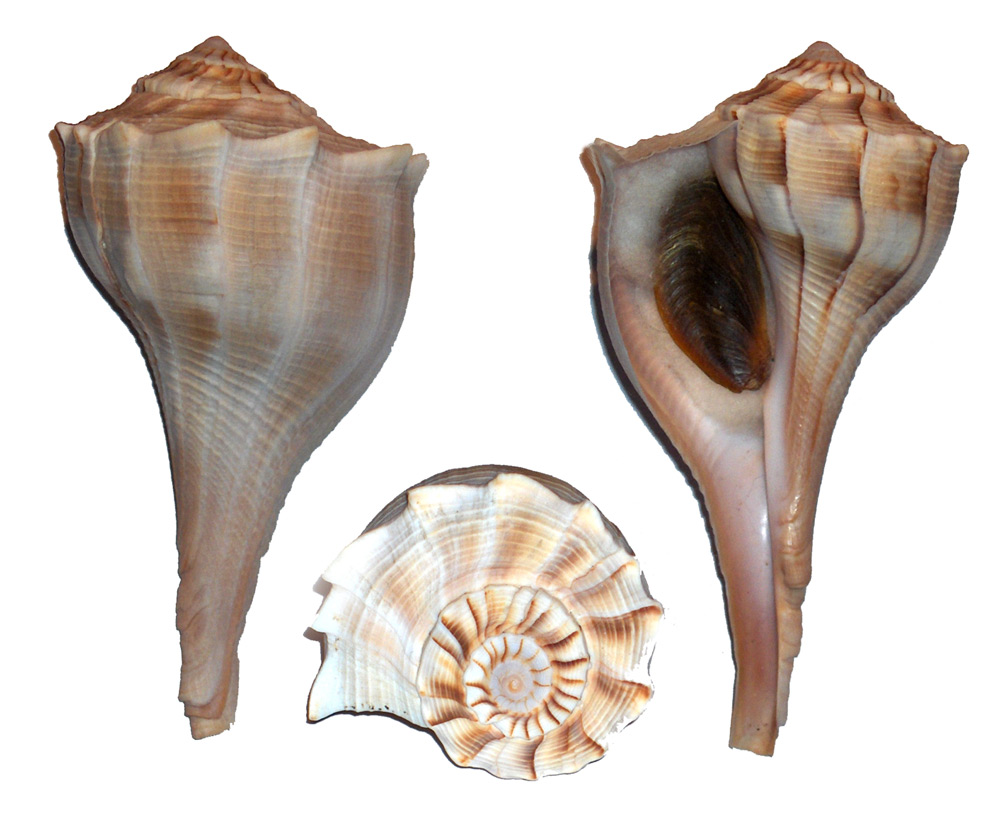
- Sinistrofulgur perversum, with the operculum in place

Scientific classification
- Kingdom: Animalia
- Phylum: Mollusca
- Class: Gastropoda
- Subclass: Caenogastropoda
- Order: Neogastropoda
- Family: Busyconidae
- Genus: Sinistrofulgur
- Species: S. perversum

Binomial name
- Sinistrofulgur perversum (Linnaeus, 1758)
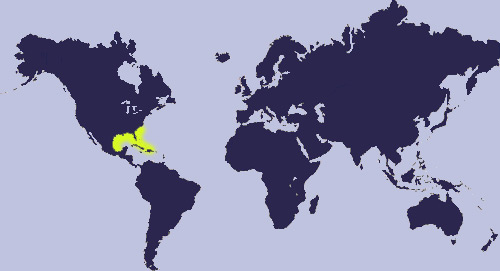
- Range

Synonyms
- Busycon (Sinistrofulgur) perversum (Linnaeus, 1758); Busycon perversum (Linnaeus, 1758); Fulgur gibbosum Conrad, 1853; Murex perversus Linnaeus, 1758 (original combination); Pyrula kieneri Philippi, 1848

= Sinistrofulgur perversum =

Species of gastropod

Sinistrofulgur perversum, the lightning whelk, is a species of very large predatory sea snail or whelk, a marine gastropod mollusc in the family Busyconidae, the busycon whelks. This species has a left-handed or sinistral shell. It eats mostly bivalves.

There has been some disagreement about the correct scientific name for this species, which has been confused with Sinistrofulgur sinistrum Hollister, 1958, and Busycon contrarium (Conrad, 1840), which is an exclusively fossil species.

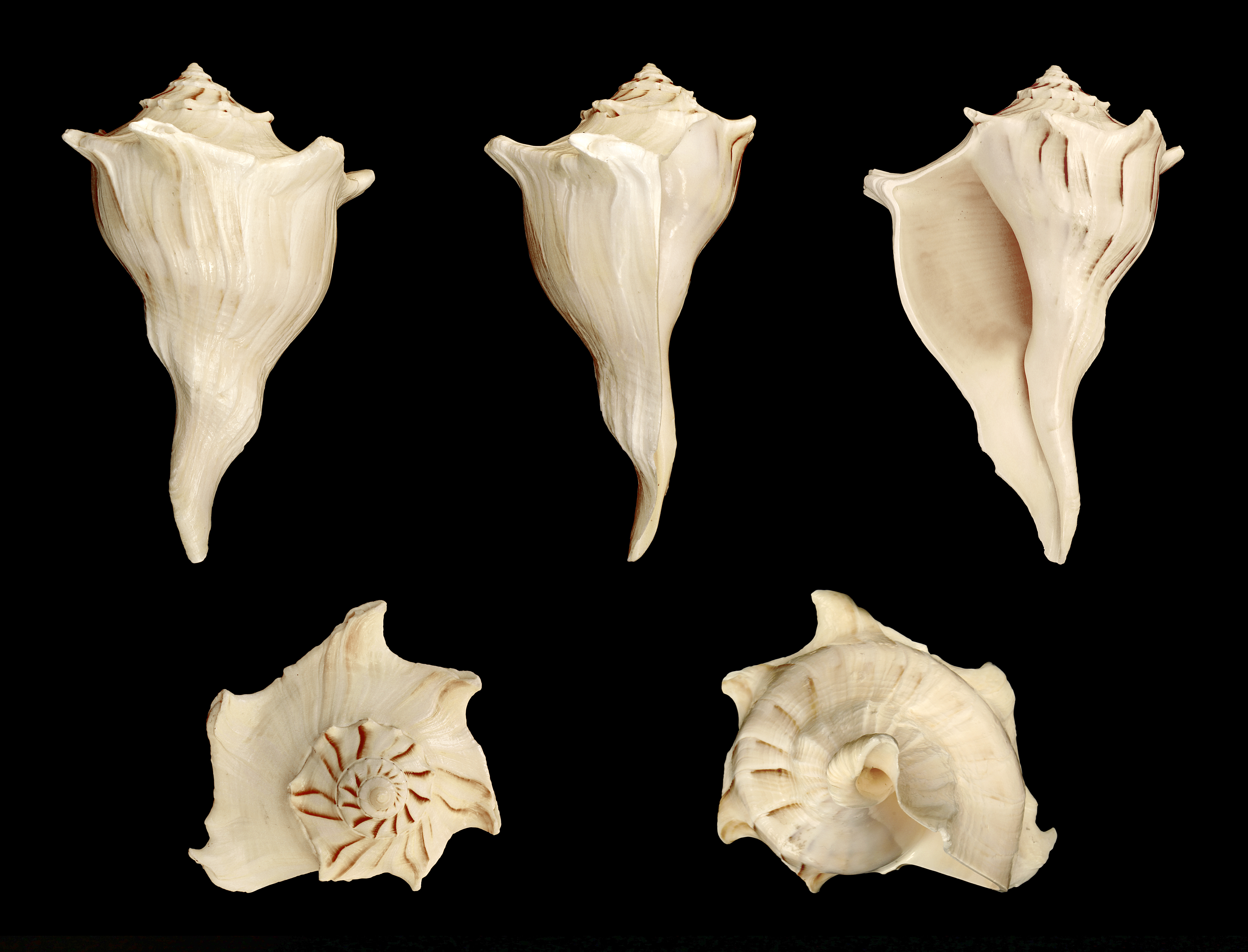
Form with extensions

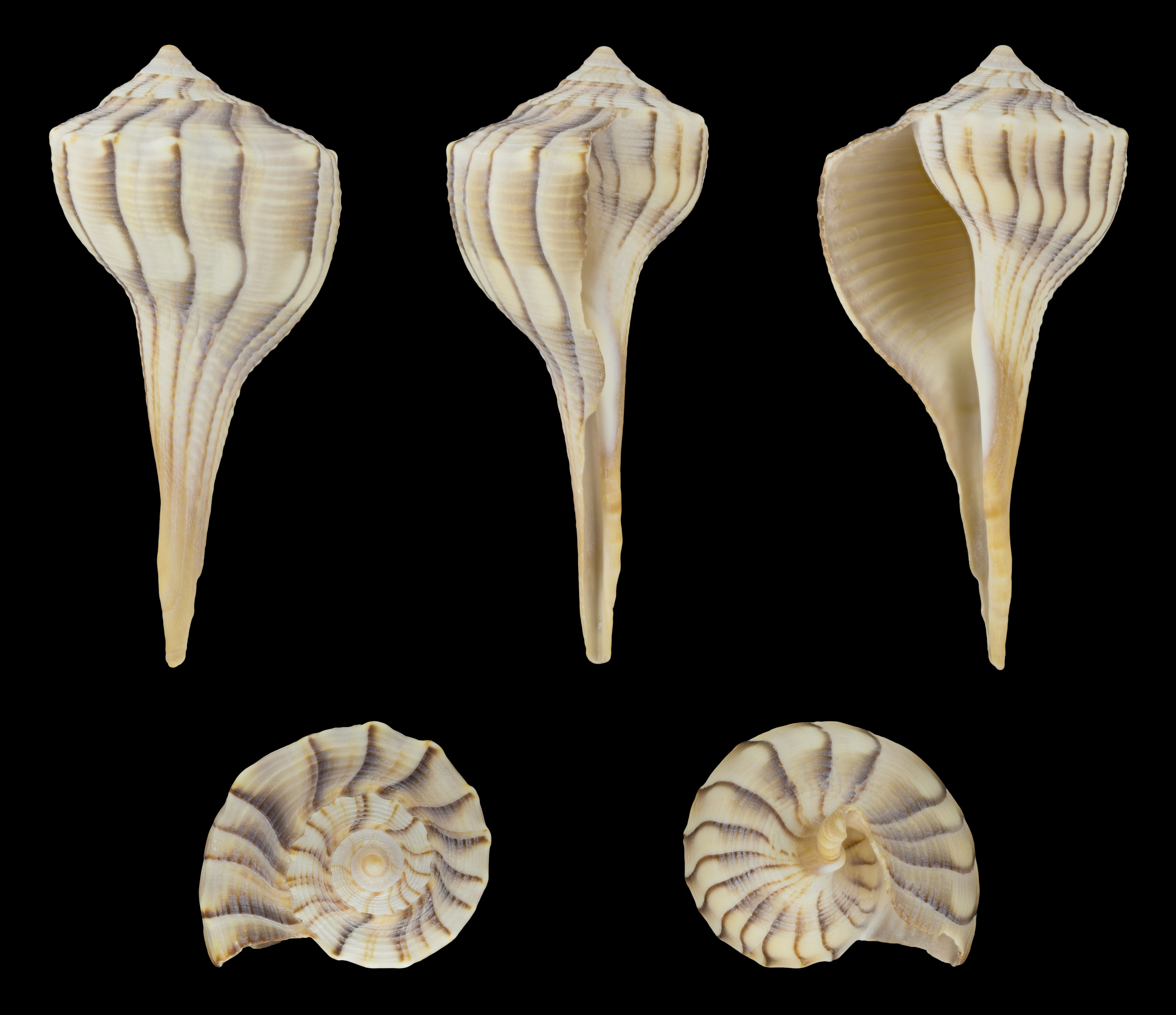
Form without extensions

== Distribution ==
This marine species is native to the Mid-Atlantic region of the United States and southeastern North America, from New Jersey south to Florida and the Gulf states.

== Habitat ==
Lightning whelks can be found in the sandy or muddy substrate of shallow embayments.

== Life habits ==
This whelk species feeds primarily on marine bivalves, ingesting their soft parts using its proboscis.

== Sinistrofulgur perversum and Busycon carica ==
This species shares many characteristics with another species, the knobbed whelk Busycon carica, but there are some important differences:

- Lightning whelks are sinistral in coiling, whereas knobbed whelks are dextral
- Lightning whelks have a lower spire than the knobbed whelk
- The knobs of the lightning whelk are usually less well-developed than those of the knobbed whelk
- Lightning whelks are diurnal, while knobbed whelks are active both day and night
- Lightning whelks prefer to stay in deeper waters than the knobbed whelks when feeding on mud flats

== Human use ==
For thousands of years Native Americans used these animals as food, and used their shells for tools, ornaments, containers and to make jewelry, i.e. shell gorgets. For example, the Indigenous peoples of Florida used their shells as hammers, axes, and cups; Floridan archaeologists have likened them to Swiss Army knives for their versatility. They may have believed the sinistral nature of the lightning whelk shell made it a sacred object. The Minnesota Woman (lived c. 6000 BCE in modern Minnesota) wore a Sinistrofulgur perversum shell.

The lightning whelk is the "State Seashell of Texas".

== Gallery ==
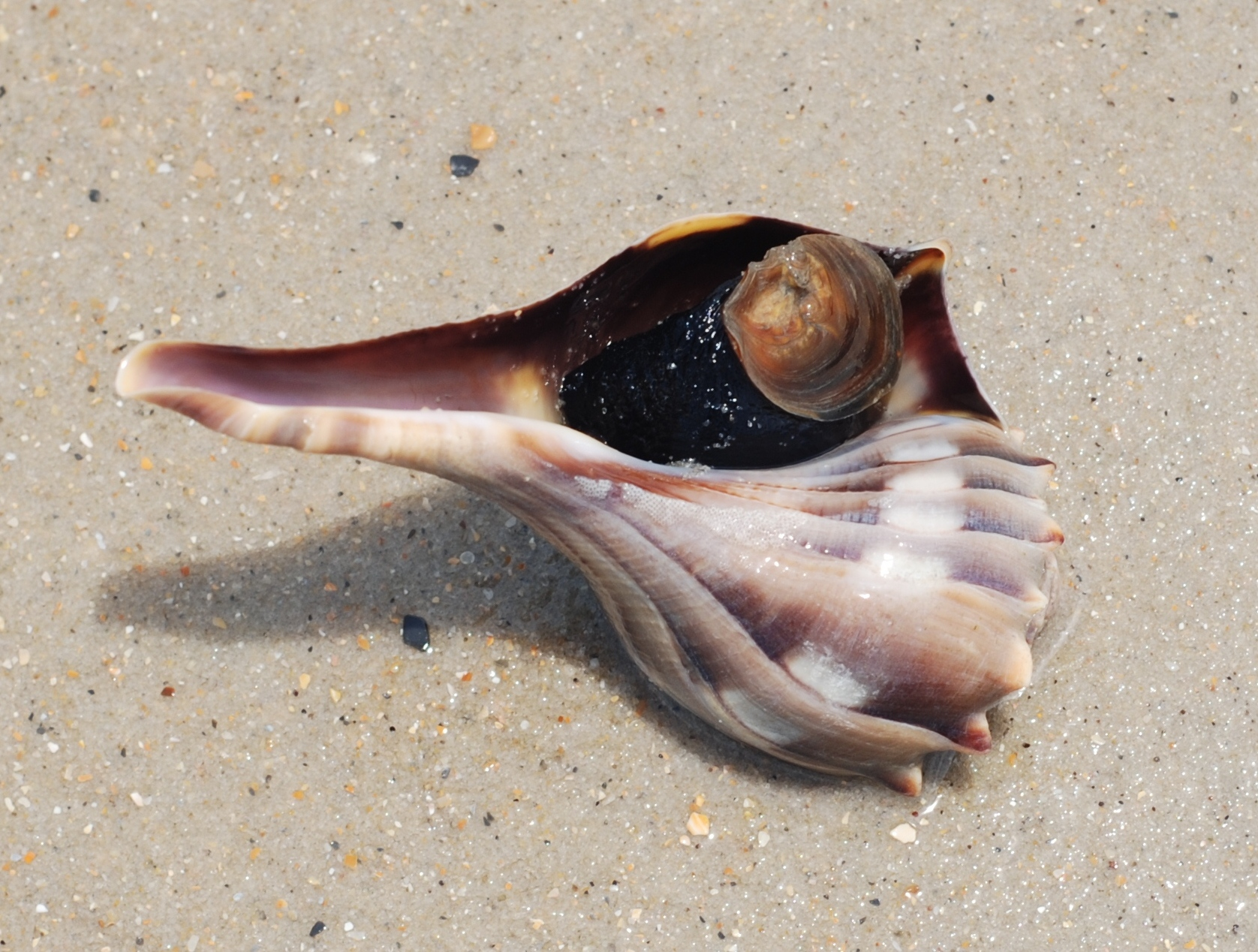
Live lightning whelk in North Carolina

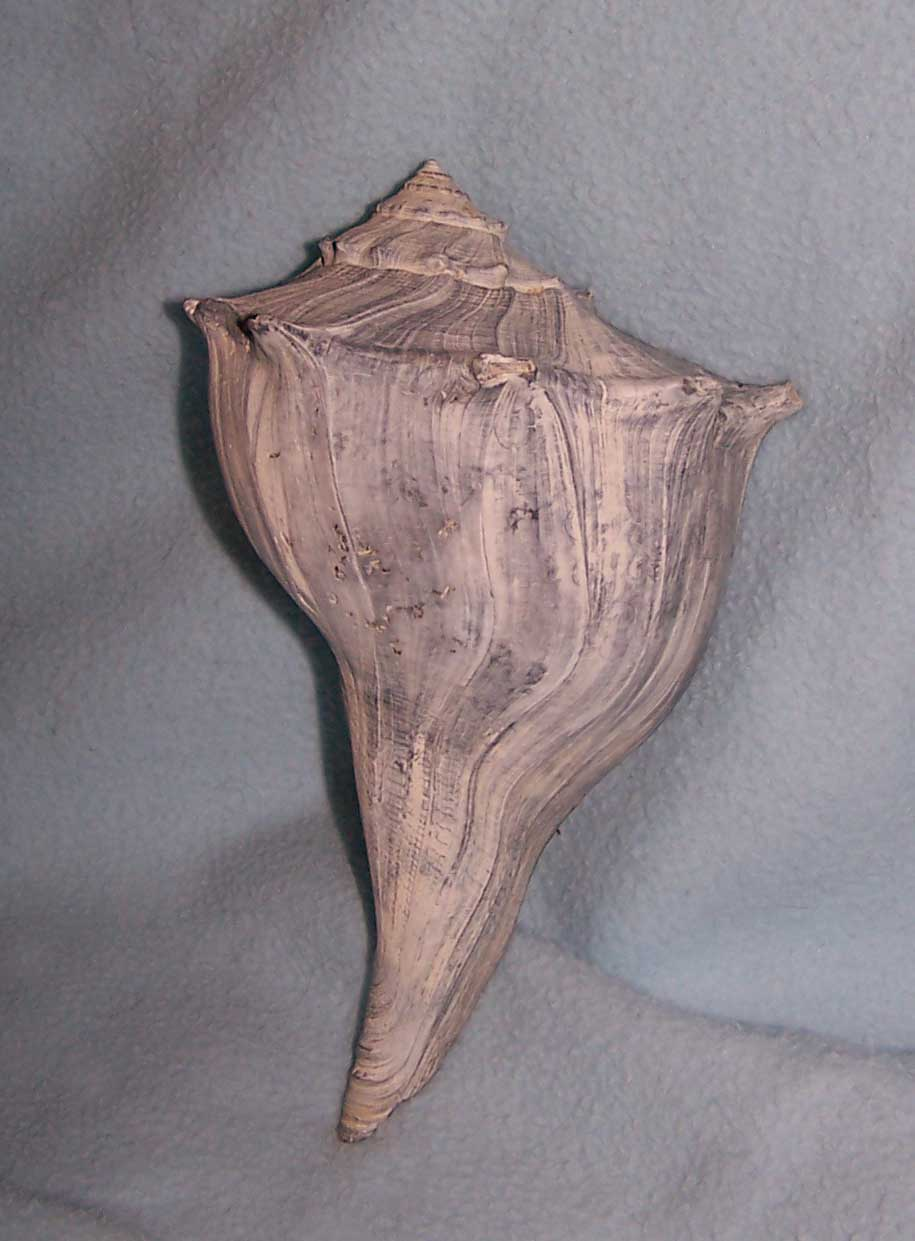
Abapertural view of a shell

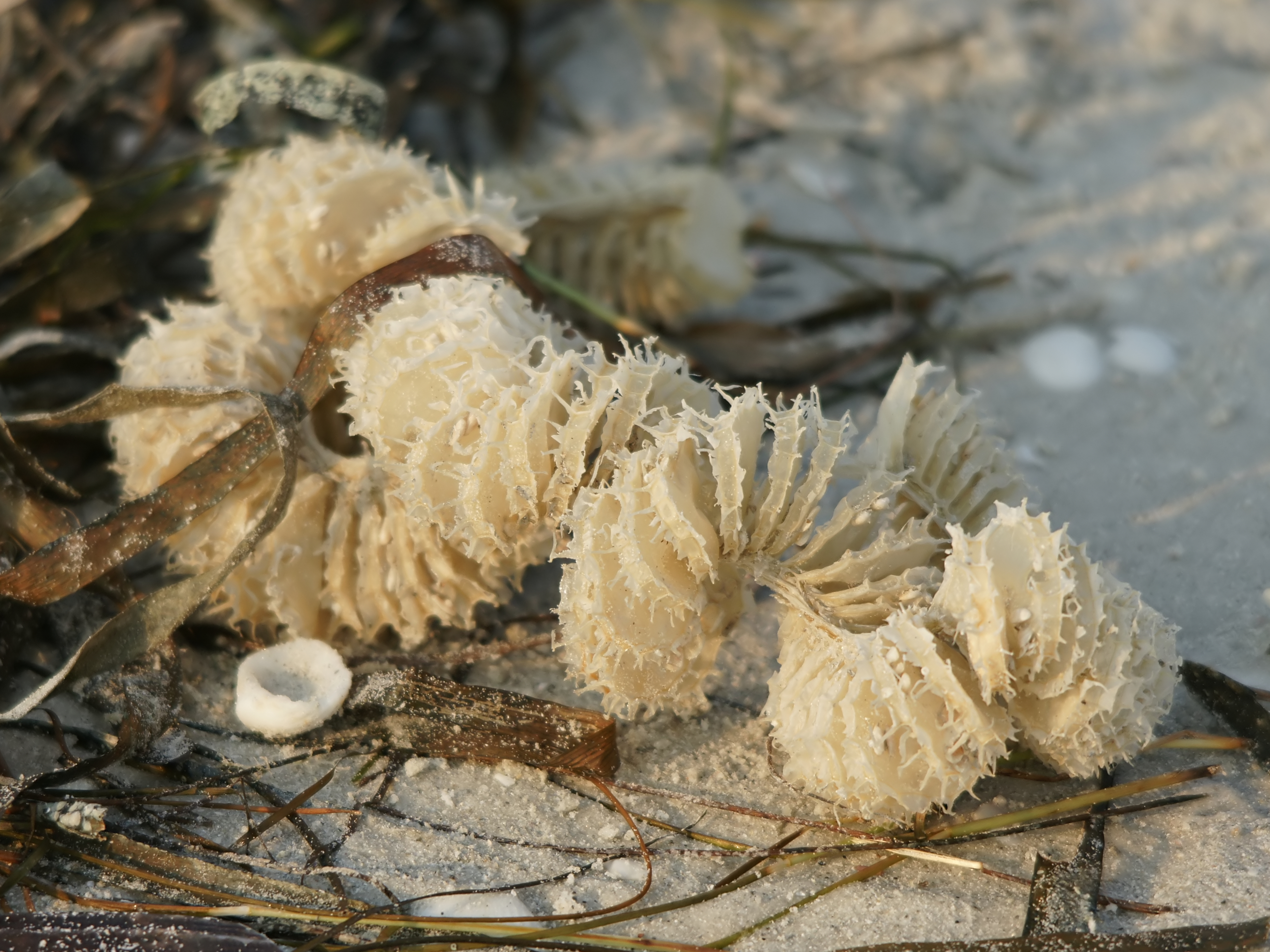
Egg cases

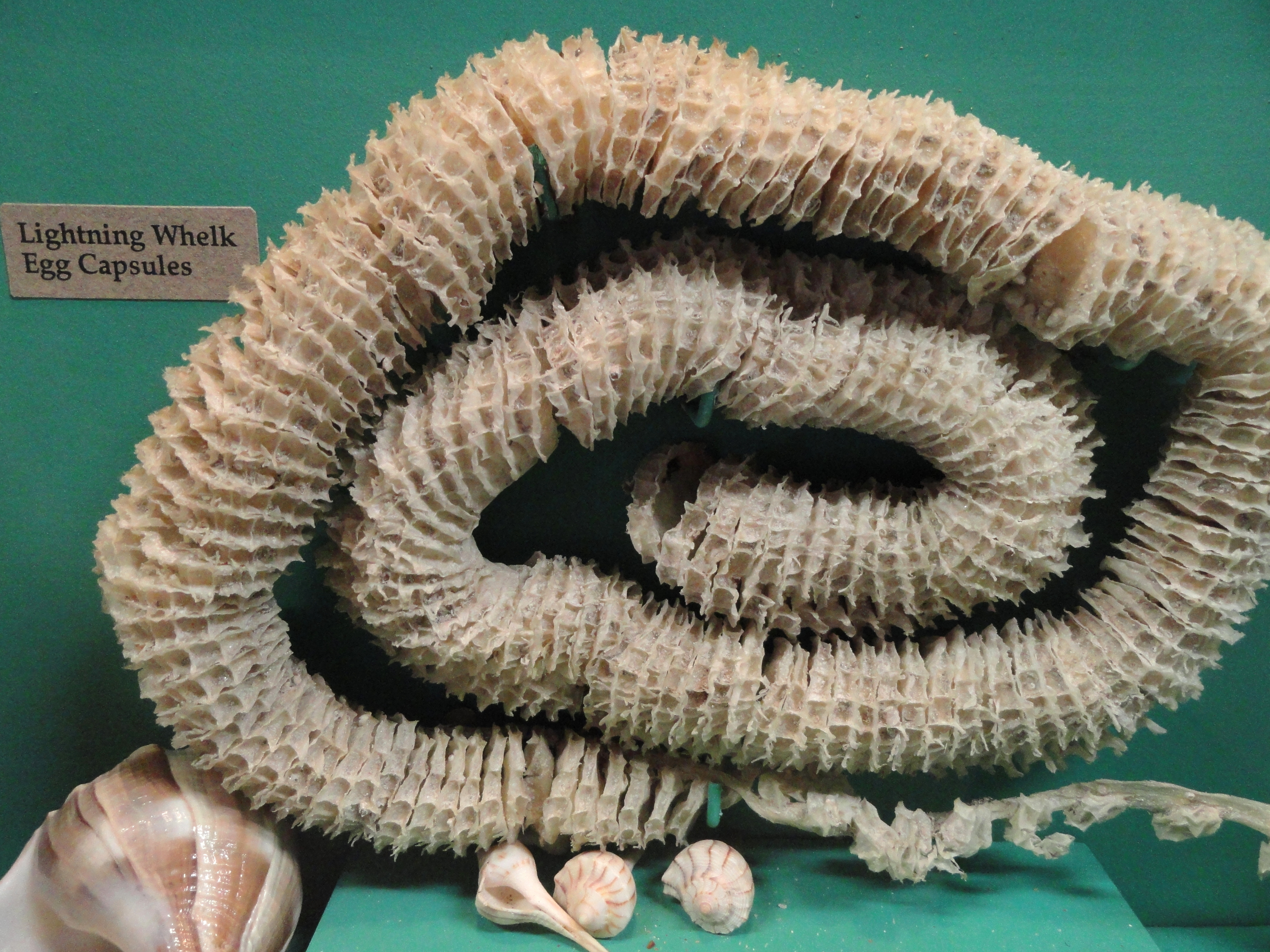
Egg cases in a museum
