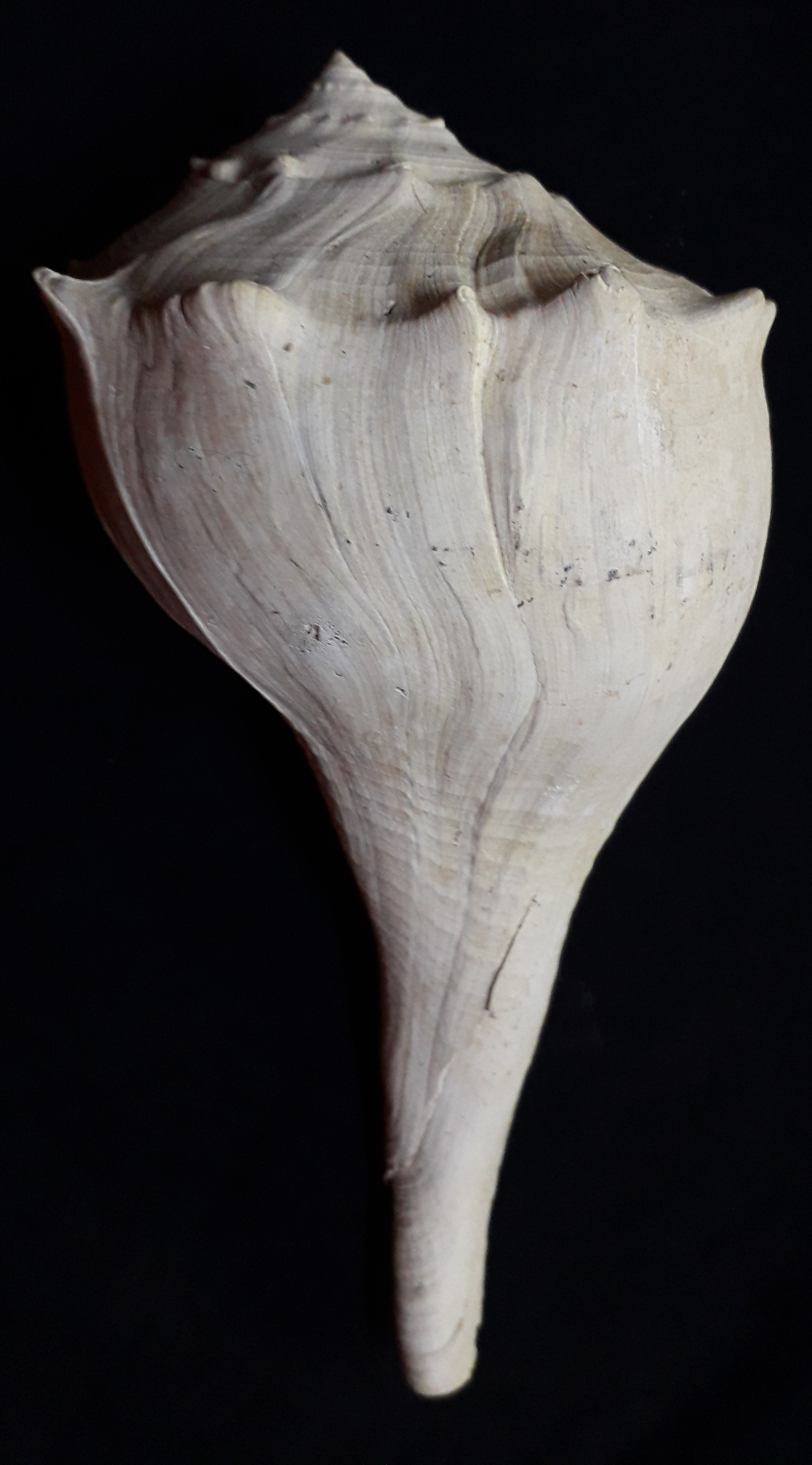
- A shell of S. contrarium
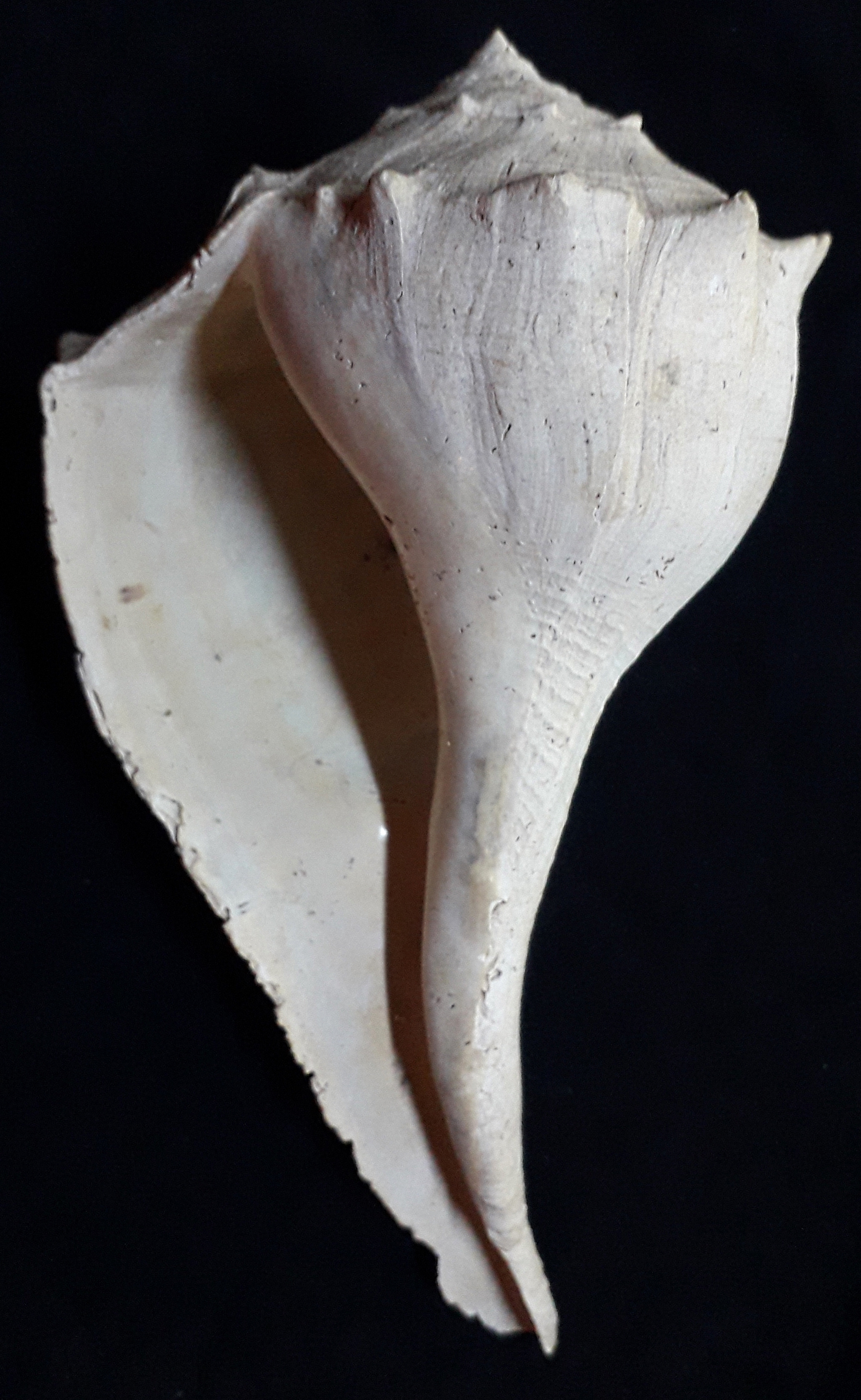

Scientific classification
- Kingdom: Animalia
- Phylum: Mollusca
- Class: Gastropoda
- Subclass: Caenogastropoda
- Order: Neogastropoda
- Family: Busyconidae
- Genus: Sinistrofulgur
- Species: †S. contrarium

Binomial name
- †Sinistrofulgur contrarium (Conrad, 1840)

Synonyms
- †Busycon contrarium (Conrad, 1840); †Fulgur contrarius Conrad, 1840

= Sinistrofulgur contrarium =

Sinistrofulgur contrarium Temporal range: Miocene-Pleistocene

Extinct species of gastropod

Sinistrofulgur contrarium is a fossil snail species of the busycon whelks in the family Busyconidae. There has been some confusion about the correct taxonomy of this species, which has been confused with the extant species Sinistrofulgur sinistrum Hollister, 1958, and Sinistrofulgur perversum (Linnaeus, 1758)

== Description ==
Shell size of this operculated sinistral species 170 mm.

== Distribution ==
In muddy sand with sea-grass: Sanibel Island, Florida.
