= Fulguropsis pyruloides =

Fulguropsis pyruloides Temporal range: Pleistocene–Recent

Scientific classification
- Kingdom: Animalia
- Phylum: Mollusca
- Class: Gastropoda
- Subclass: Caenogastropoda
- Order: Neogastropoda
- Family: Busyconidae
- Subfamily: Busycotypinae
- Genus: Fulguropsis
- Species: F. pyruloides

Binomial name
- Fulguropsis pyruloides (Say, 1822)

Synonyms
- Fulgur pyruloides Say, 1822 (original combination)

Species of sea snails

Fulguropsis pyruloides is a species of Marine Gastropod, commonly known as the pear whelk. It is also known as the Florida pear whelk or Atlantic pear whelk in scientific and shelling circles to differentiate from the more well known Fulguropsis spirata, which is also known as the Pear Whelk. It was first described by American conchologist, Thomas Say, in 1822.

For a time before the species' range was fully known and it was understood that F. spirata was only found West of the State of Mississippi, they were occasionally referred to as "Say's Pear Whelk" though this term has fallen out of use.

Subspecies

- Fulguropsis pyruloides pyruloides (Say, 1822)
- Fulguropsis pyruloides rachelcarsonae Petuch, R. F. Myers & Berschauer, 2015

== Range ==
This species is native to the Atlantic coast from North Carolina south to Key West as well as the Gulf of Mexico from Alabama eastwards. There is intergrade along the coast of Mississippi, as well as possible intergrade along the Florida Panhandle and Alabama coastline with the species Fulguropsis spirata.

The species inhabits a range formerly ascribed to the aforementioned F. spirata, which was generally found to only inhabit coastlines west of the Mississippi Delta, most if not all specimens east of Alabama are likely of F. pyruloides. This has revealed that many specimens formerly listed as F. spirata were actually F. pyruloides the entire time, though these errors have yet to be corrected for the most part.
