= Fulguropsis feldmanni =

Scientific classification
- Kingdom: Animalia
- Phylum: Mollusca
- Class: Gastropoda
- Subclass: Caenogastropoda
- Order: Neogastropoda
- Family: Busyconidae
- Genus: Fulguropsis
- Species: F. feldmanni

Binomial name
- Fulguropsis feldmanni Petuch, 1991

Species of gastropod

Fulguropsis feldmanni is a species of sea snail, a marine gastropod mollusk in the family Busyconidae, the crown conches and their allies.

== Description ==
The shell grows to a length of 57 mm. Fulguropsis feldmanni belongs to a genus of whelk-like sea snails primarily distributed along the eastern coast of North America. Its distribution in the Gulf of Mexico represents a southward extension into subtropical Mexican waters, where it co-occurs with related species such as Fulguropsis texana.

== Distribution ==
This species occurs in the Gulf of Mexico, off Yucatán, Mexico.
