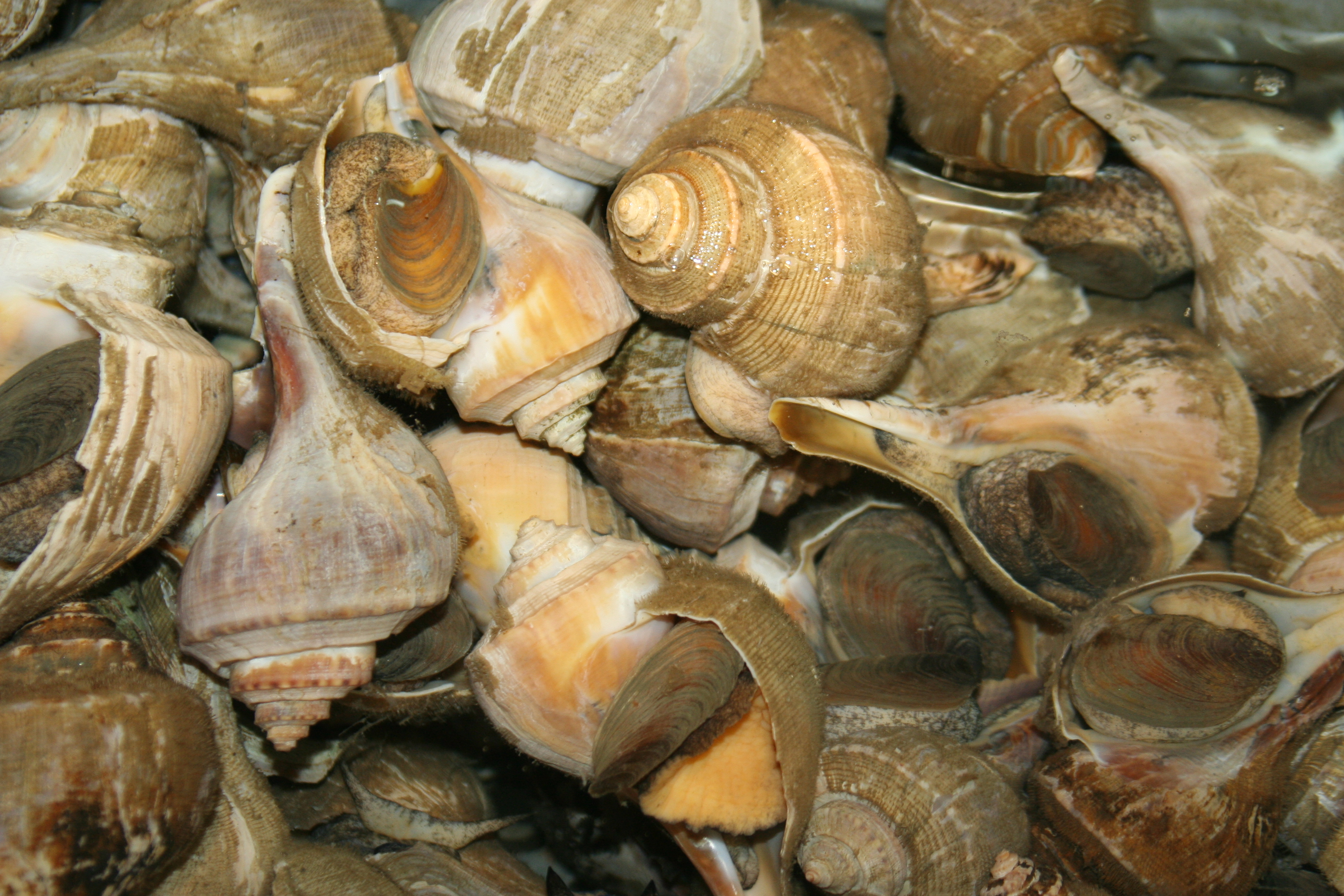
- Live Busycotypus canaliculatus for sale in a California seafood market

Scientific classification
- Kingdom: Animalia
- Phylum: Mollusca
- Class: Gastropoda
- Subclass: Caenogastropoda
- Order: Neogastropoda
- Superfamily: Buccinoidea
- Family: Busyconidae
- Subfamily: Busycotypinae
- Genus: Busycotypus; Wenz, 1943

Type species
- Murex canaliculatus Linnaeus, 1758

Species
- See text

Synonyms
- Busycotypus (Pyrofulgur) Hollister, 1958

= Busycotypus =

Genus of gastropods

Busycotypus is a genus of very large sea snails, marine gastropod mollusks in the subfamily Busycotypinae .

In the United States, these are commonly known as whelks.

== Species ==
- † Busycotypus calvertensis Petuch, 1988
- Busycotypus canaliculatus (Linnaeus, 1758) (the channeled whelk)

Species brought into synonymy

- Busycotypus plagosus (Conrad, 1863): synonym of Fulguropsis plagosa (Conrad, 1863)
- Busycotypus spiratus (Conrad, 1863): synonym of Fulguropsis spirata (Lamarck, 1816)
