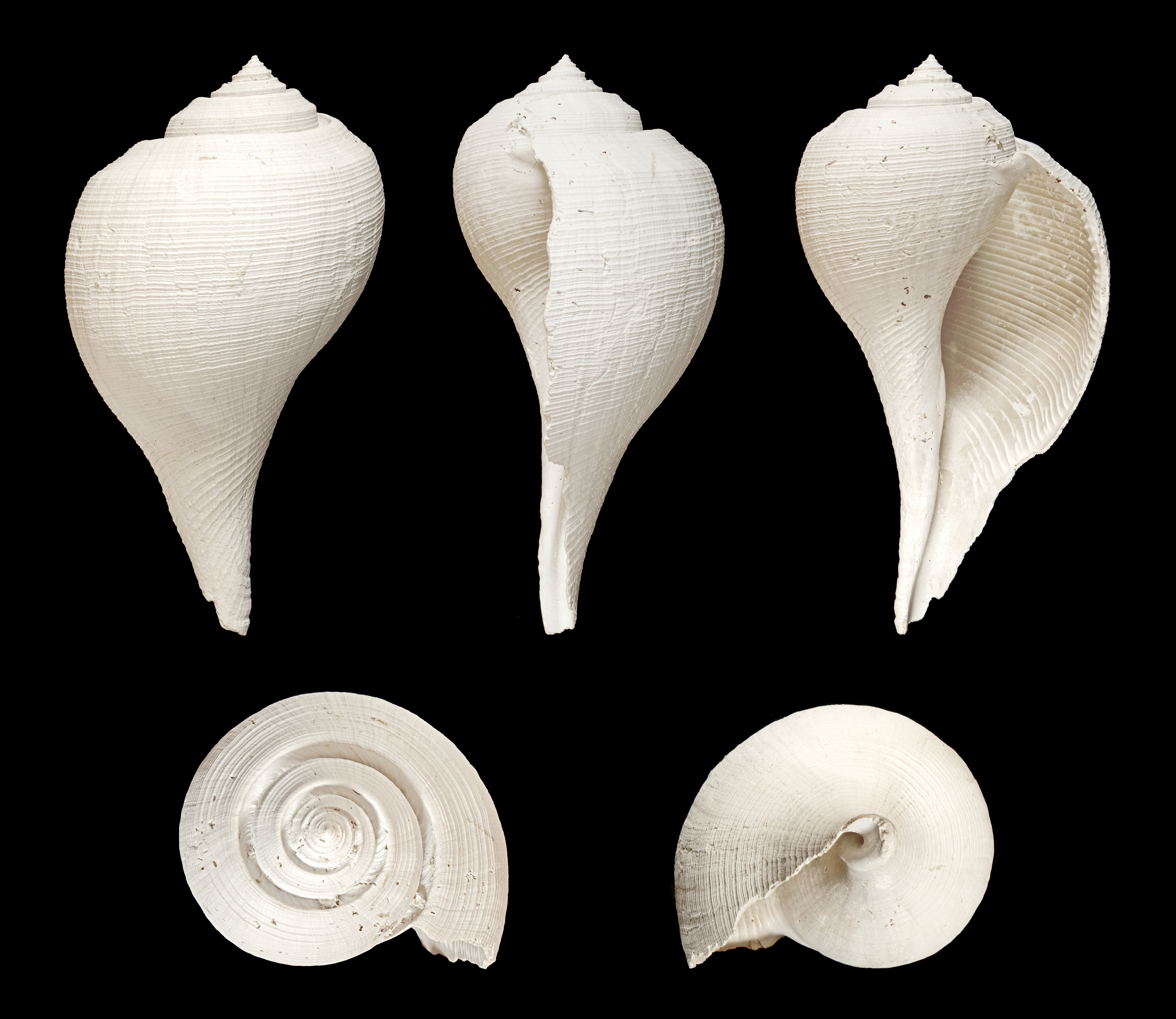
- † Fulguropsis radula

Scientific classification
- Kingdom: Animalia
- Phylum: Mollusca
- Class: Gastropoda
- Subclass: Caenogastropoda
- Order: Neogastropoda
- Family: Busyconidae
- Subfamily: Busycotypinae
- Genus: Fulguropsis; Marks, 1950

Type species
- Bulla pyrum Dillwyn, 1817

= Fulguropsis =

Genus of gastropods

Fulguropsis is a genus of sea snails, marine gastropod molluscs in the family Busyconidae, the crown conches and their allies.

== Species ==
Species within the genus Fulguropsis include:

- Fulguropsis feldmanni Petuch, 1991
- Fulguropsis keysensis Petuch, 2013
- Fulguropsis plagosa (Conrad, 1863)
- Fulguropsis pyruloides (Say, 1822)
- † Fulguropsis radula Petuch, 1994
- Fulguropsis spirata (Lamarck, 1816)
- Fulguropsis texana (Hollister, 1958)

Species brought into synonymy

- Fulguropsis rachelcarsonae Petuch, R.F. Myers & Berschauer, 2015: synonym of Fulguropsis pyruloides rachelcarsonae Petuch, R. F. Myers & Berschauer, 2015 (original rank)
- Fulguropsis spiratum : synonym of Busycotypus spiratus (Lamarck, 1816), synonym of Fulguropsis spirata (Lamarck, 1816)
