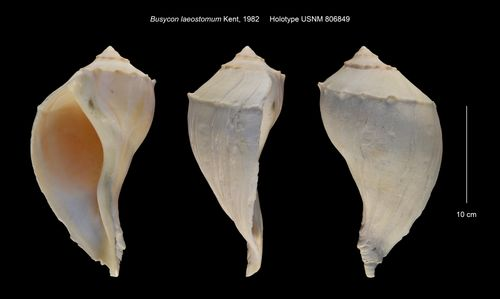
- Holotype

Scientific classification
- Kingdom: Animalia
- Phylum: Mollusca
- Class: Gastropoda
- Subclass: Caenogastropoda
- Order: Neogastropoda
- Family: Busyconidae
- Genus: Sinistrofulgur
- Species: S. laeostomum

Binomial name
- Sinistrofulgur laeostomum (Kent, 1982)

Synonyms
- Busycon laeostomum Kent, 1982; Busycon perversum laeostomum (Kent, 1982)

= Sinistrofulgur laeostomum =

Species of mollusc

Sinistrofulgur laeostomum is a carnivorous whelk in the family Busyconidae. It is found below the intertidal zone. It was described from shells found offshore from southern New Jersey to northern Virginia, where it is most often found, but it has also been found in parts of Florida.

== Habitat and distribution ==
Sinistrofulgur laeostomum has a minimum recorded depth of 0 meters and a maximum recorded depth of 15 meters.

Its type locality is Stone Harbor, New Jersey. There was at least one other recorded from this location, from the collection of Harry Lee.

== Description ==
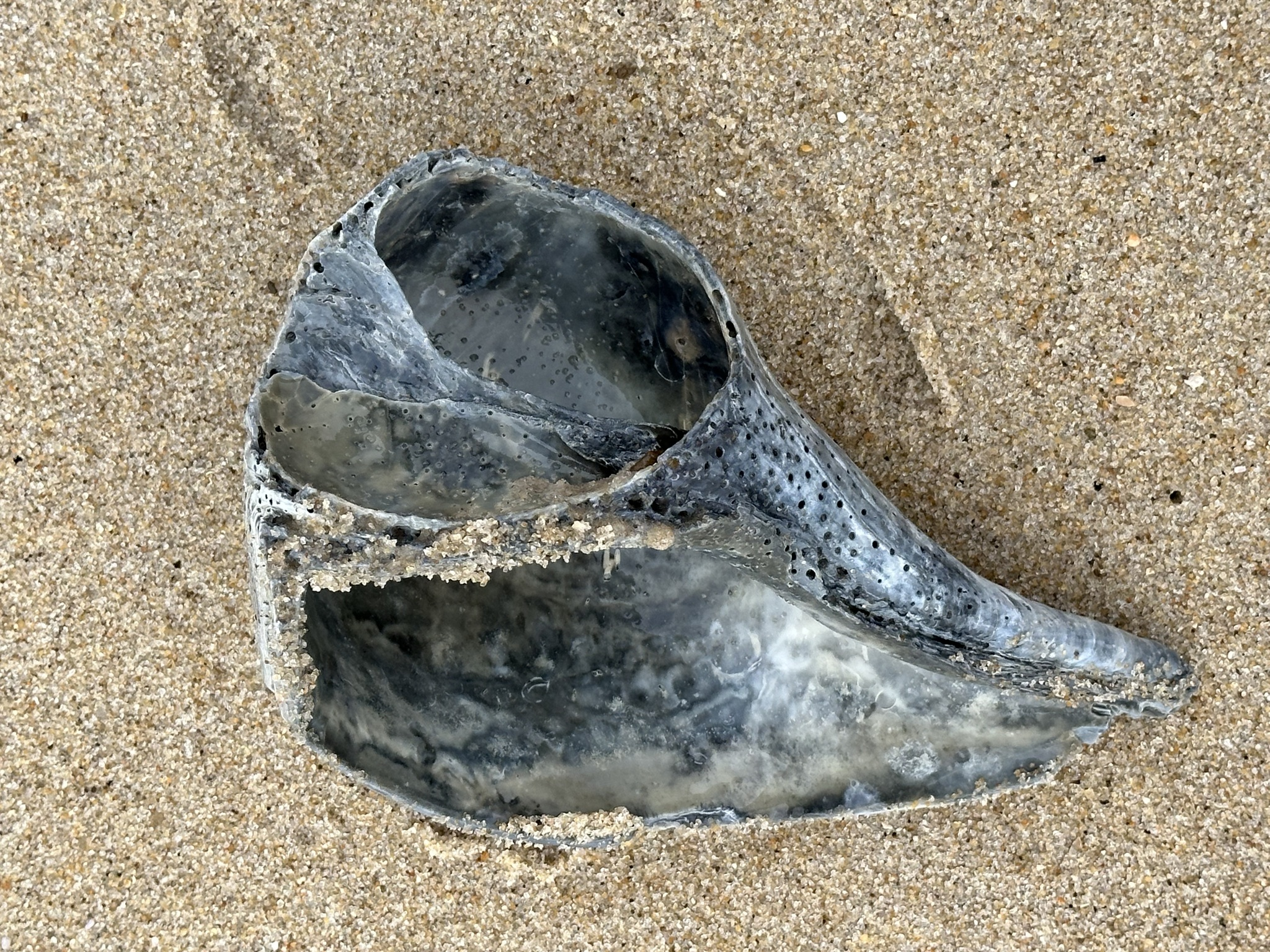
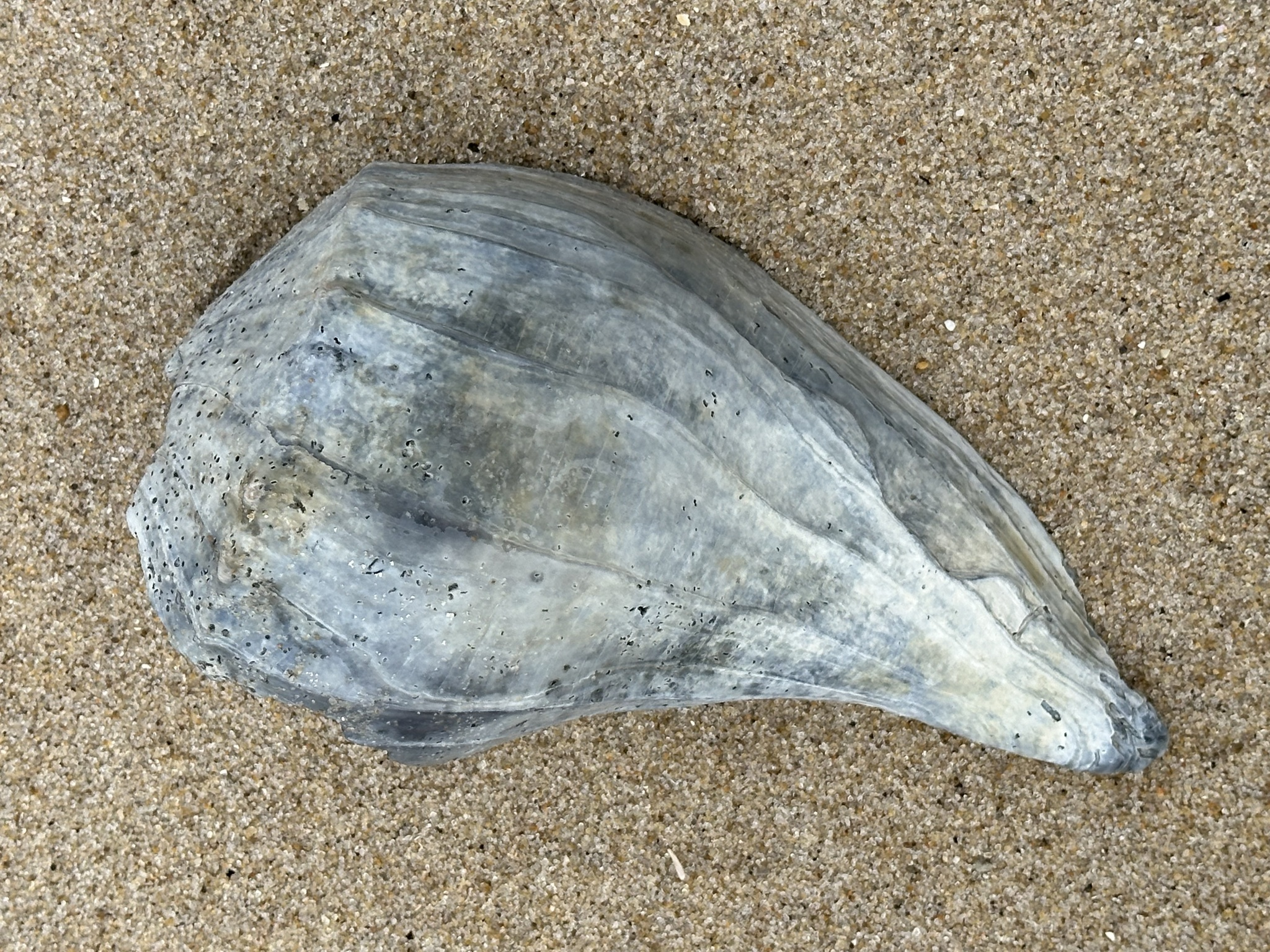
A damaged specimen from Chincoteague National Wildlife Refuge

Sinistrofulgur laeostomum has a large, elongated body whorl, and each whorl has a row of blunt knobs along its shoulder.
