= Albert Jenks =

American anthropologist and professor at the University of Minnesota

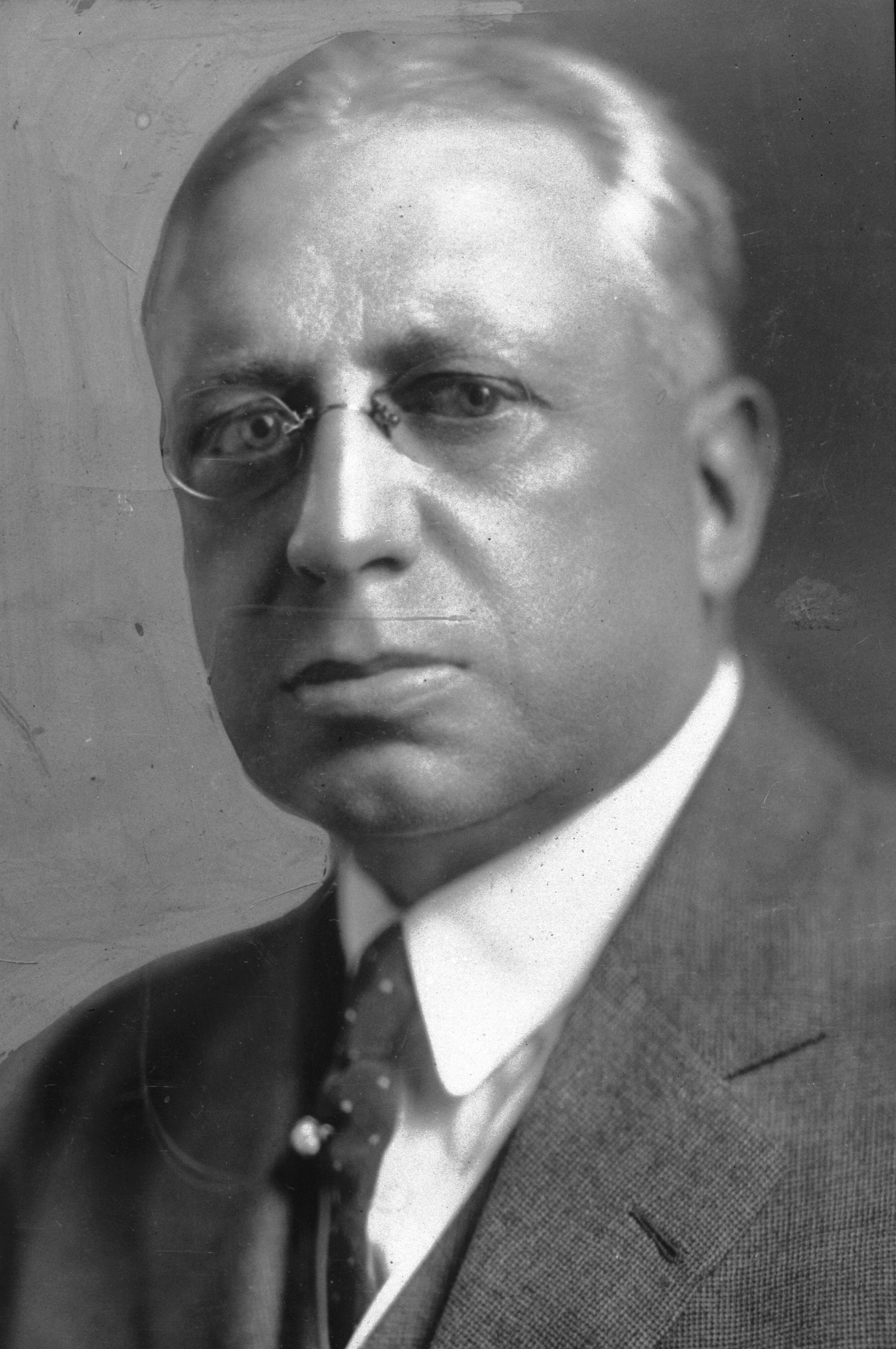
- Born: November 28, 1869; Ionia, Michigan
- Died: June 6, 1953 (aged 83)
- Education: University of Wisconsin-Madison (PhD in Economics)
- Known for: Identification of Minnesota Woman
- Scientific career
- Fields: Economics, Sociology, Anthropology
- Workplaces: University of Minnesota
- Thesis: (1899)

Albert Ernest Jenks (1869–1953) was an American anthropologist and a professor at the University of Minnesota. He was known for his work in historical anthropological studies on rice cultivation, the development of hominids, and his identification of the skeletal remains of Minnesota Woman, 8,000-year old human remains found near Pelican Rapids, Minnesota. He joined the United States Bureau of Ethnology in 1901 and served in the U.S. colonial government of the Philippines from 1902 to 1905. In this capacity, he was involved in the exhibition of Bontoc Igorot people at the 1904 Louisiana Universal Exposition in St. Louis (St. Louis World's Fair). The collection of Bontoc objects that he assembled for the Exposition was purchased by the American Museum of Natural History in New York. He joined the faculty of the University of Minnesota in 1906 as a member of the Department of Sociology. He was promoted to full professor in 1907 and served as chair of the sociology department from 1915 until 1918. In 1918, he was a founder of the Department of Anthropology at the University of Minnesota and he served as the chair of that department until his retirement in 1936.
