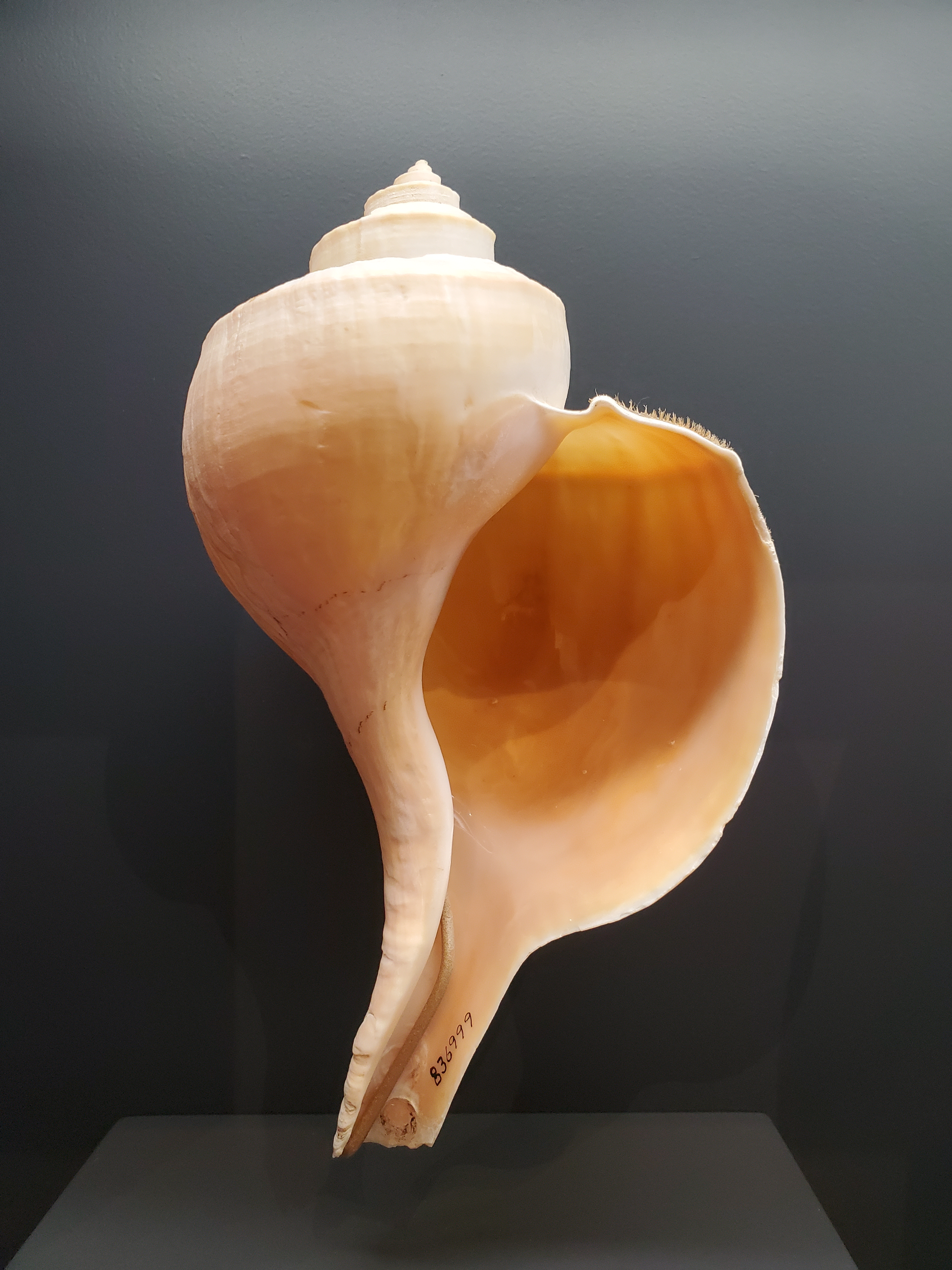
- A shell of a channeled whelk

Scientific classification
- Kingdom: Animalia
- Phylum: Mollusca
- Class: Gastropoda
- Subclass: Caenogastropoda
- Order: Neogastropoda
- Family: Busyconidae
- Subfamily: Busycotypinae
- Genus: Busycotypus
- Species: B. canaliculatus

Binomial name
- Busycotypus canaliculatus (Linnaeus, 1758)

Synonyms
- Busycon canaliculatum (Linnaeus, 1758); Murex canaliculatus Linnaeus, 1758 (original combination)

= Busycotypus canaliculatus =

Channeled whelk

Species of gastropod

Busycotypus canaliculatus, commonly known as the channeled whelk, is a very large predatory sea snail, a marine prosobranch gastropod, a busycon whelk, belonging to the family Busyconidae.

== Distribution ==
This species is native to the eastern coast of the United States, from Cape Cod, Massachusetts to northern Florida. It has also been introduced into San Francisco Bay.

== Shell description ==
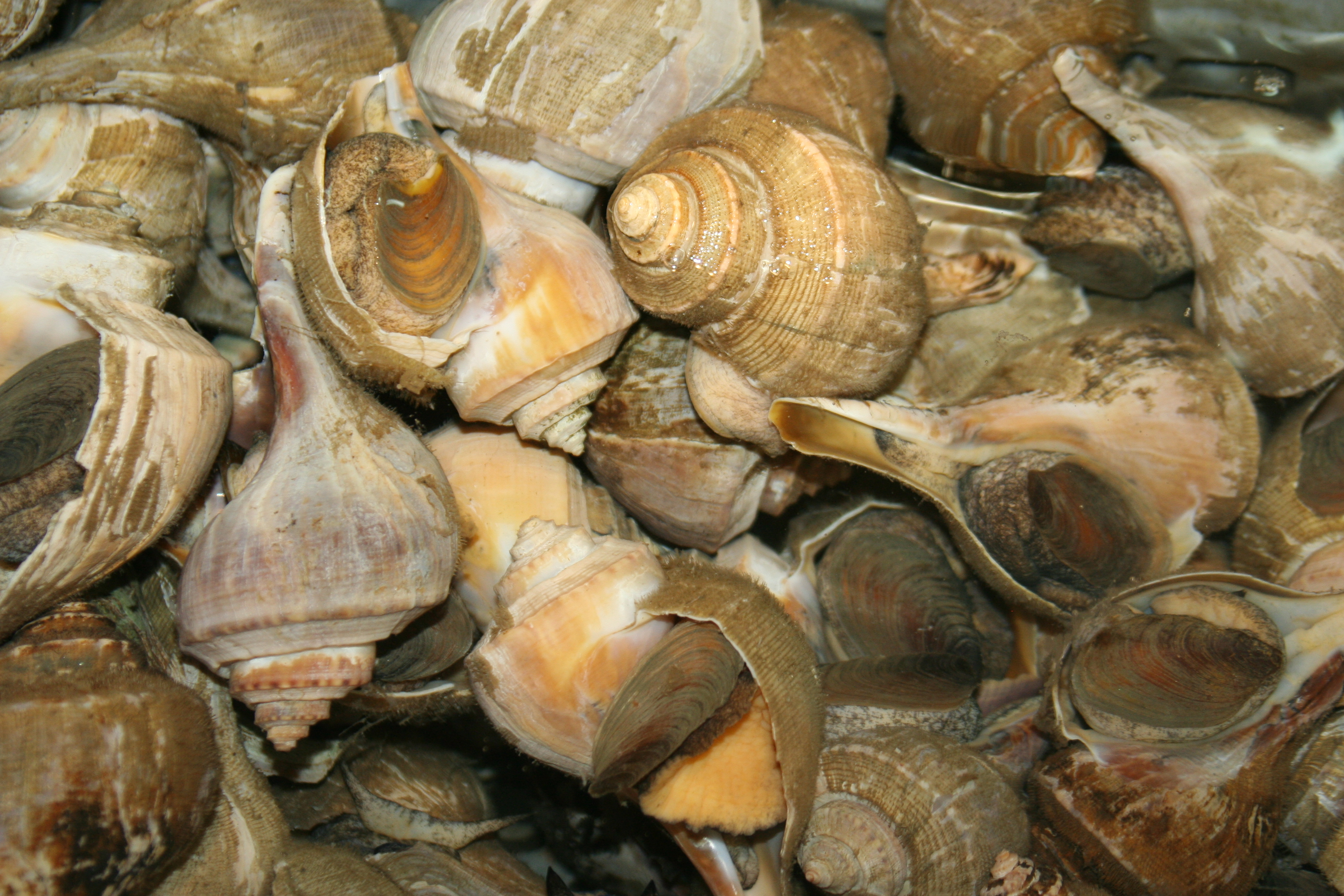
Live channeled whelks for sale in a California seafood market

Shells of the channeled whelk typically reach 5 to 8 inches in length. The shell is smooth and subpyriform (generally pear-shaped), with a large body whorl and a straight siphonal canal. Between the whorls there is a wide, deep channel at the suture, and there are often weak knobs at the shoulders of the whorls. Finely sculpted lines begin at the siphonal canal and revolve around the shell surface.

The color of the shell is typically a buff gray to light tan. The shell aperture is located on the right side, i.e. the shell of this species is almost always dextral in coiling. Left-handed or sinistral specimens occur rarely.

Channeled whelks prefer sandy, shallow, intertidal or subtidal areas, and can be common in these habitats. They tend to be nocturnal and are known to eat clams.

One of their predators is the blue crab Callinectes sapidus.

== Human uses ==
The species is edible.

Busycotypus canaliculatus, along with hard clam, is used in the creation of wampum, which is a traditional shell bead made by the Eastern Woodlands tribes of Native Americans. White wampum beads are made of the inner spiral or columella of the channeled whelk shell Busycotypus canaliculatus or Busycotypus carica. Sewant or suckauhock beads are the black or purple shell beads made from the hard clam. Before European contact, strings of wampum were used for storytelling, ceremonial gifts, and recording important treaties and historical events, such as the Two Row Wampum Treaty and Hiawatha belts. Wampum was also used by the northeastern Indigenous tribes as a means of exchange, strung together in lengths for convenience.
