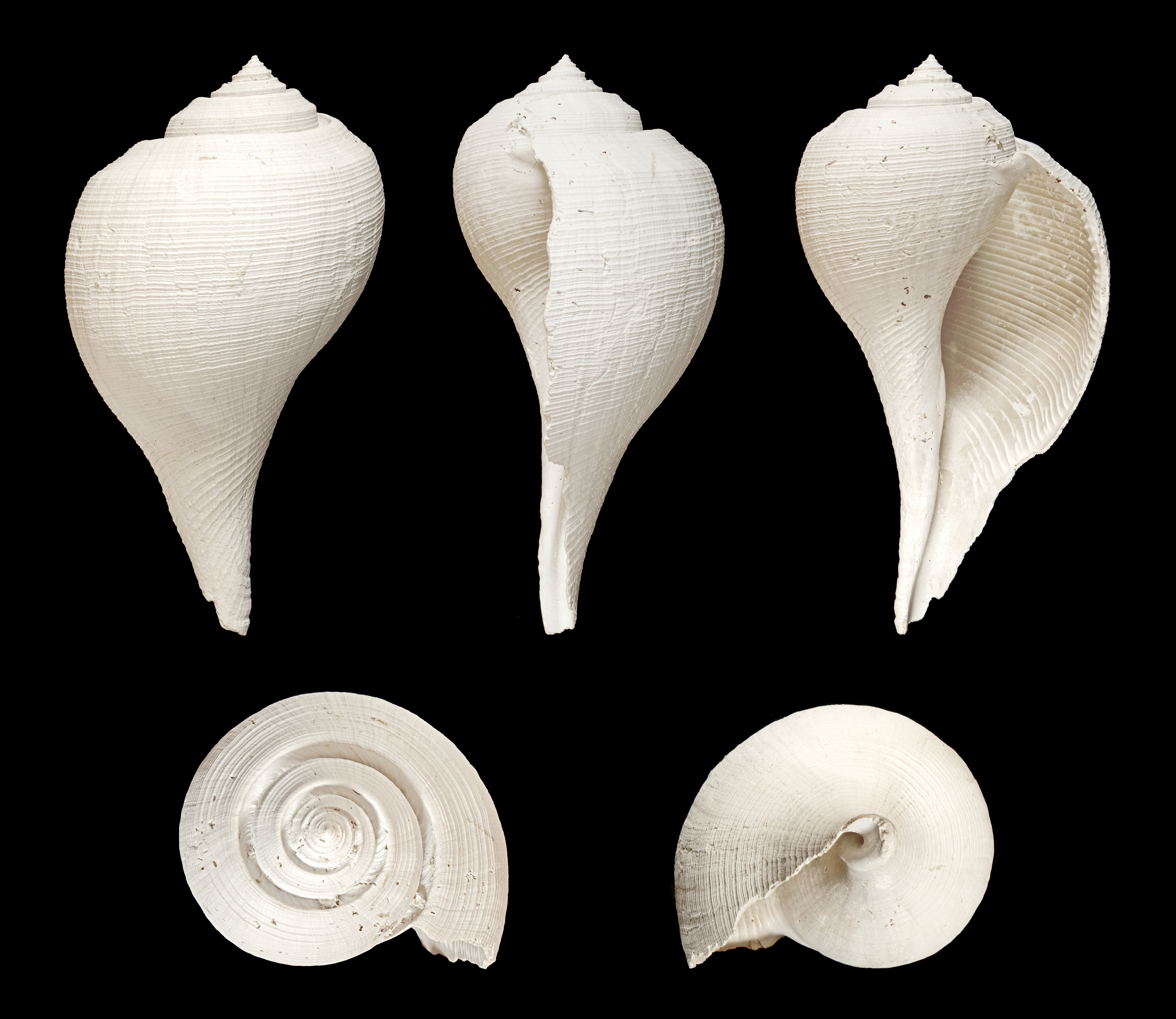
- The fossil species Fulguropsis radula Petuch, 1994

Scientific classification
- Domain: Eukaryota
- Kingdom: Animalia
- Phylum: Mollusca
- Class: Gastropoda
- Subclass: Caenogastropoda
- Order: Neogastropoda
- Family: Busyconidae
- Subfamily: Busyconinae; Wade, 1917 (1867)

= Busyconinae =

Subfamily of gastropods

The Busyconinae are taxonomic subfamily of large sea snails, often known as whelks. The name "whelk" also refers to Buccinidae. Busyconinae consists of Recent and fossil species.

== Genera ==
- † Brachysycon Petuch, 1994
- Busycoarctum Hollister, 1958
- Busycon Röding, 1798
  - Tribe Busyconini Wade, 1917
  - Tribe Busycotypini Petuch, 1994
- † Coronafulgur Petuch, 2004
- † Laevisycon Petuch, R.F. Myers & Berschauer, 2015
- Lindafulgur Petuch, 2004
- † Pyruella Petuch, 1982
- Sinistrofulgur Hollister, 1958
- † Spinifulgur Petuch, 1994
- † Sycofulgur Marks, 1950
- † Sycopsis Conrad, 1867
- † Turrifulgur Petuch, 1988

Genera brought into synonymy

- Fulgur Montfort, 1810: synonym of Busycon Röding, 1798
