= Minnesota Woman =

8,000 year old woman whose skeleton was found in Minnesota, USA

Coordinates: 46°36′32″N 96°3′10″W

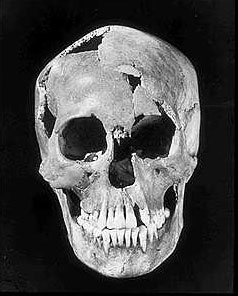
- Skull of "Minnesota Woman"
- Born: c. 5955 B.C
- Died: c. 5939 B.C (aged c. 16) now Minnesota, United States
- Body discovered: 16 June 1931
- Resting place: South Dakota, United States

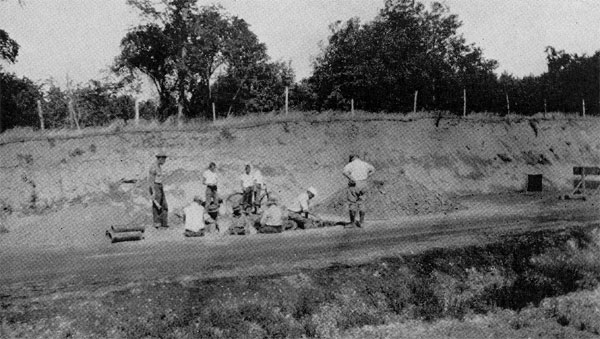
Second redigging of the Minnesota Woman site by the University of Minnesota, looking toward the west bank of the highway cut, unearthed in 1931

Minnesota Woman, also known as Pelican Rapids-Minnesota Woman (c. 5955 – c. 5939 BC), is the name given to a Paleo-Indian teenage girl whose skeletal remains are thought to be 8,000 years old or more. She is also known as The Lady of the Lake or Nimuué, The bones were found near Pelican Rapids, Minnesota on June 16, 1931, during construction on U.S. Route 59. The bones were brought to Albert Jenks at the University of Minnesota, who identified them as the bones of a girl who was 15 or 16 years old, but who had never borne children. The girl had a number of artifacts including a dagger made from an elk's horn, a conch shell pendant, and a wolf's tooth. The conch shell came from a whelk species known as Sinistrofulgur perversum, which was only known to live in the Atlantic Ocean off the Mid Atlantic and Southeast coasts of the United States.

== Discovery ==
The road crew dug up the site without an investigation by archaeologists, so some of the exact details of the girl's death were hard to determine. The site indicated that the girl had not been ritually buried, and there was a thin layer of broken clam or mussel shells over the body. This led to the hypothesis that the girl had drowned, either by breaking through the ice or by falling off a boat, and that her body had been covered in mud at the bottom of a glacial lake.

Before 1926, most scientists theorized that human beings had only appeared in America within the last couple of thousand years. The discovery of Minnesota Woman provided evidence that humans had been in America for many thousands of years before that. Scientists now recognize the girl as someone whose ancestors were Paleo-American. Radiocarbon dating places the age of the bones approximately 8,000 years ago, approximately 7890 ±70 BP (i.e. between 6009 and 5869 BC); near the beginning of the Archaic period in Minnesota.

These skeletal remains have been reburied in South Dakota on October 2, 1999, by Dakota tribes and are not available for further study.

== See also ==
- List of human evolution fossils
- List of unsolved deaths
