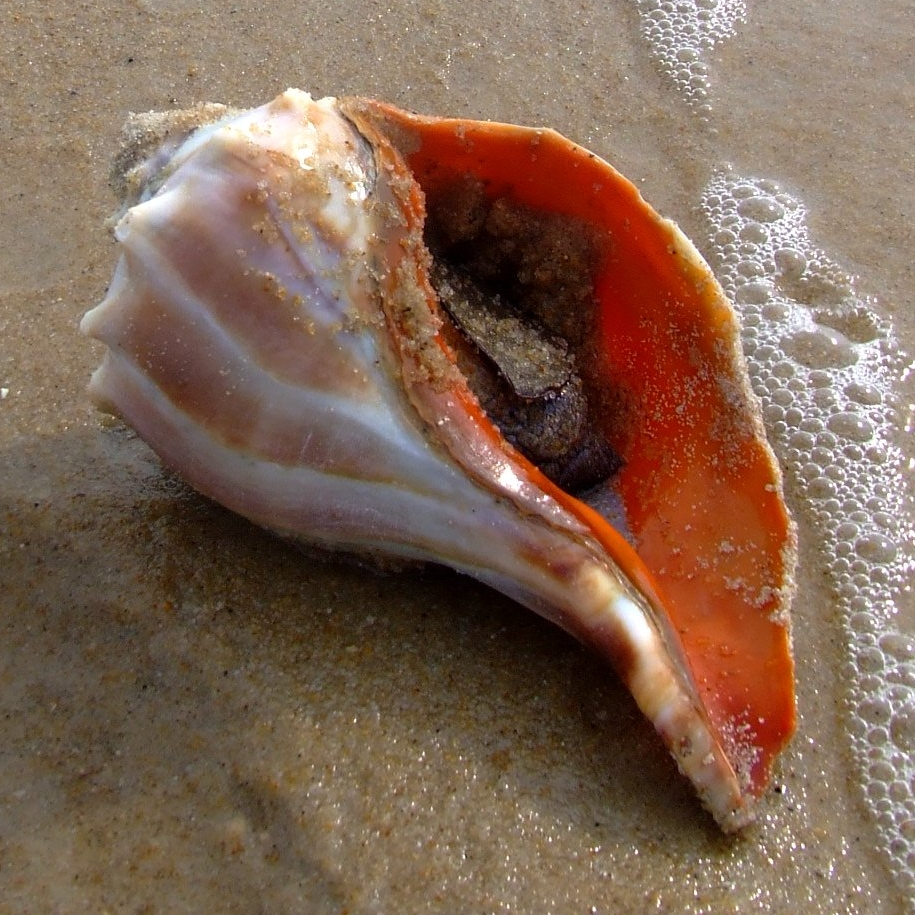
- A live individual of Busycon carica at low tide at Bethany Beach, Delaware

Scientific classification
- Kingdom: Animalia
- Phylum: Mollusca
- Class: Gastropoda
- Subclass: Caenogastropoda
- Order: Neogastropoda
- Family: Busyconidae
- Genus: Busycon
- Species: B. carica

Binomial name
- Busycon carica (Gmelin, 1791)

= Knobbed whelk =

Species of gastropod

The knobbed whelk (Busycon carica) is a species of very large predatory sea snail, or in the US, a whelk, a marine gastropod mollusk in the family Busyconidae, the busycon whelks.

The knobbed whelk is the second largest species of busycon whelk, ranging in size up to 12 in (305 mm).

== Distribution ==
Knobbed whelks are native to the North Atlantic coast of North America from Cape Cod, Massachusetts to northern Florida. This species is common along the Georgia coast. It is the state shell of New Jersey and Georgia.

== Shell description ==
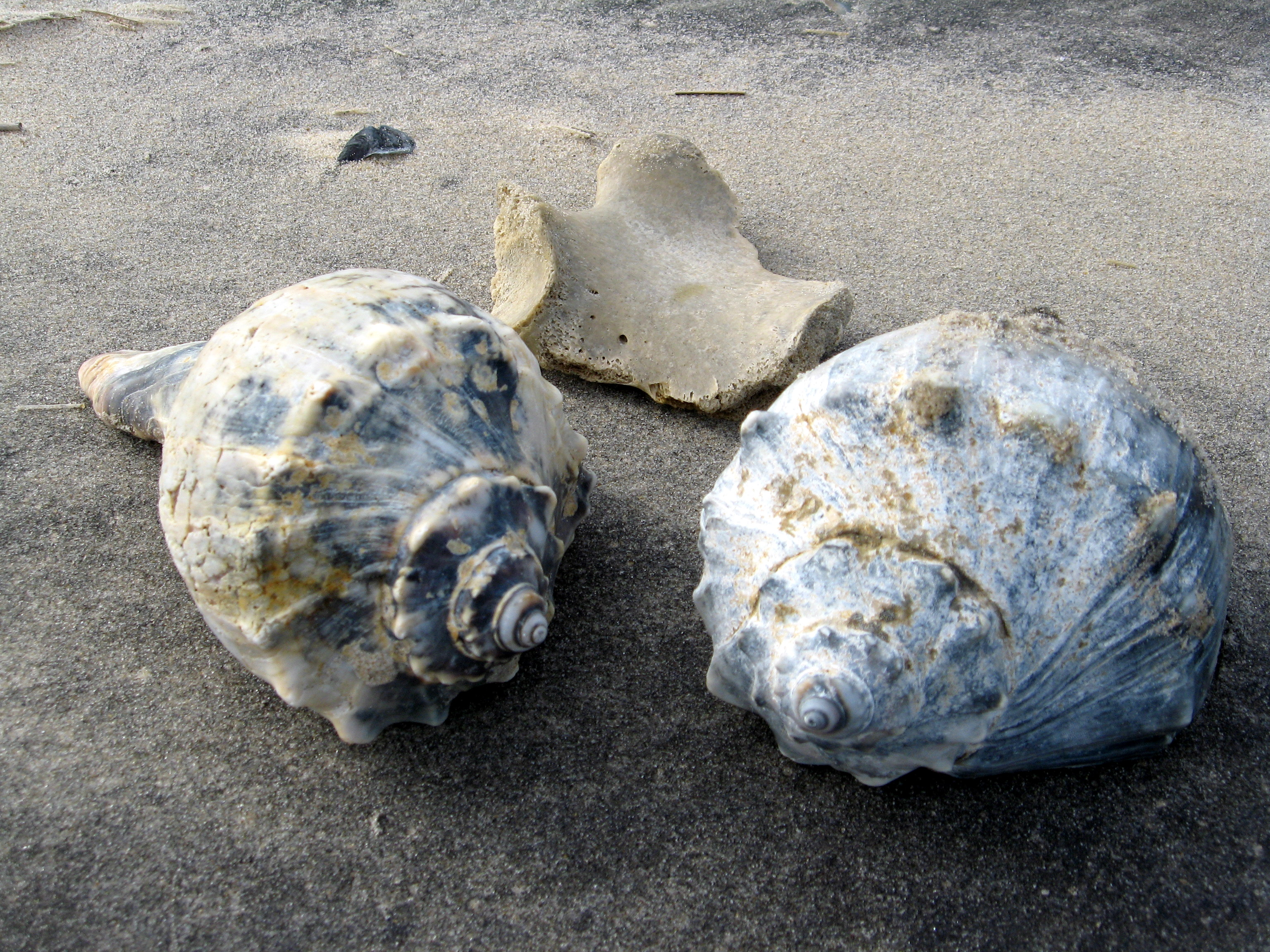
Knobbed whelk shells

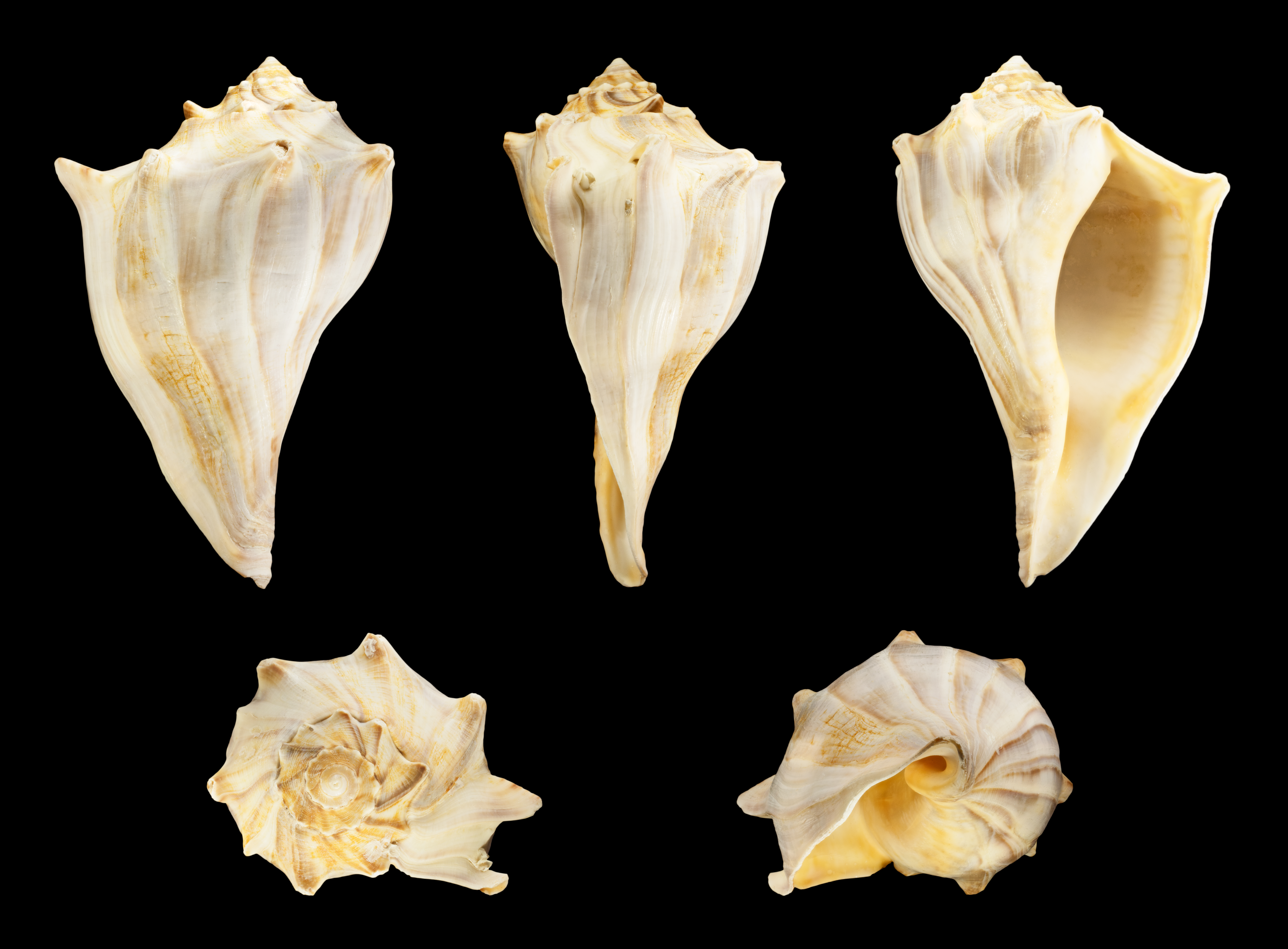
Busycon carica ssp. eliceans

The shell of most knobbed whelks is dextral, meaning that it is right-handed. If the shell is held in front of the viewer, with the spiral end up and the opening facing the viewer, the opening will be on the animal's right side. The shell is thick and strong and has six clockwise coils. The surface is sculpted with fine striations and there is a ring of knob-like projections protruding from the widest part of the coil. The color is ivory or pale gray, and the large aperture (the inside of the opening) is orange. The canal inside is wide and the entrance can be closed by a horny oval operculum.

== Habitat ==
The knobbed whelk lives subtidally and is migratory, alternating between deep and shallow water, depending on the time of year. During the weather extremes of the summer and winter months, these sea snails live in deep water, at depths of up to 48 m. In the milder weather of the spring and fall they live in shallow water, on near-shore or intertidal mud flats and sand flats.

On the shallow-water mud flats whelks prey on oysters, clams, and other marine bivalves. They wedge a bivalve open using the edge of their shell, and insert their long proboscis to eat the flesh of their victim. They rasp at the flesh using their radula, a rough tongue-like organ that has thousands of tiny denticles (tooth-like protrusions).

Knobbed whelks are slow moving odour-mediated predators that have a considerable ability for temporal integration of signals and can successfully navigate prey odour plumes in naturally turbulent environments.

== Reproduction ==
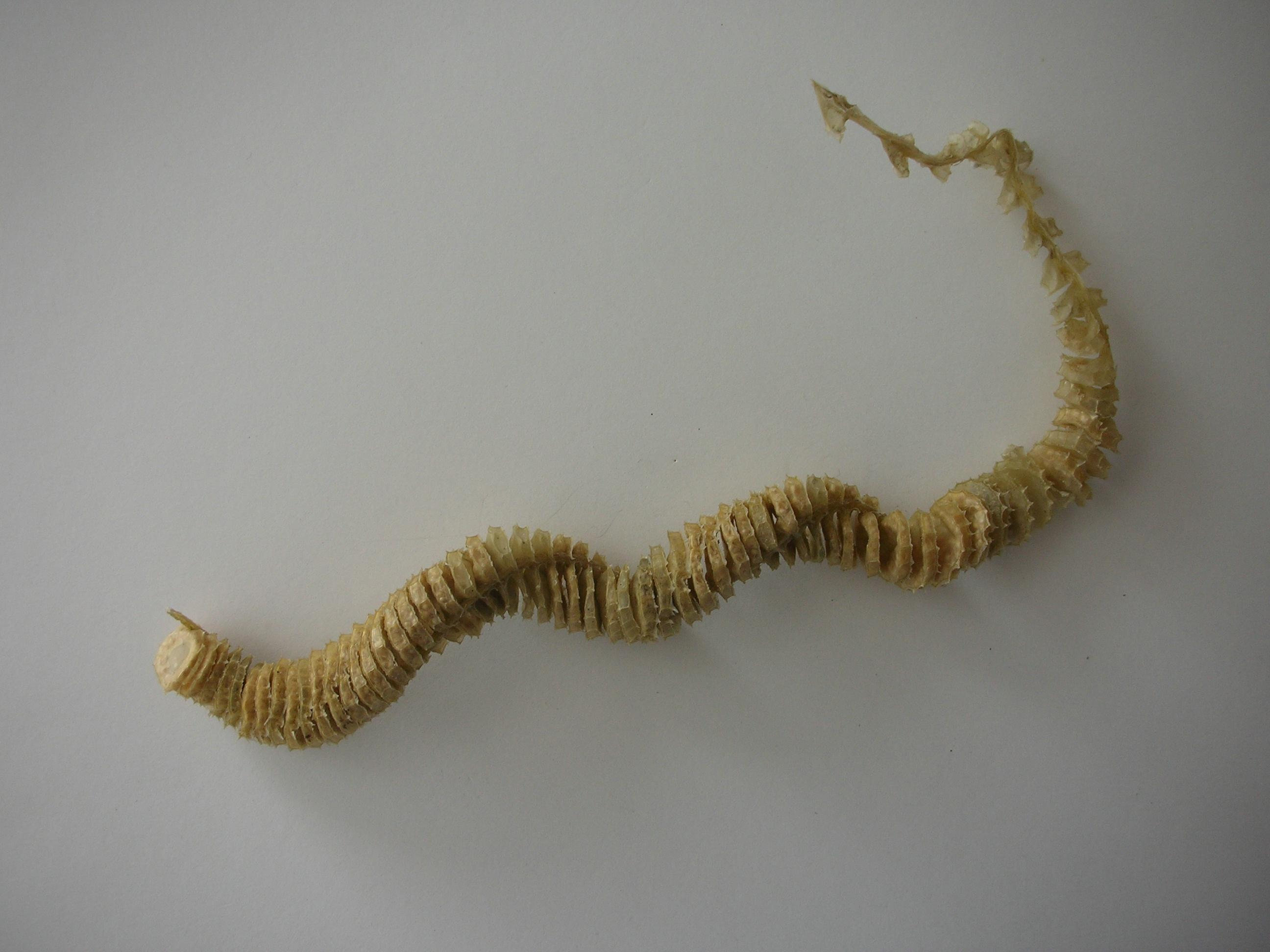
Whelk egg case

Mating and egg laying occur during the spring and fall migration. Internally fertilized eggs are surrounded by a transparent mass of albumen, a gel-like material, and are laid in protective flat, rounded egg capsules joined to form a paper-like chain of egg cases, commonly called a "Mermaid's Necklace". On average each capsule contains 0–99 eggs, with most strings having 40–160 capsules. After laying their egg cases, female knobbed whelk will bury one end of the egg case into the substrate, thus providing an anchor for the developing fertilized eggs and preventing the string of egg cases from washing ashore where it would dehydrate. Fertilized eggs develop in the capsules. Young emerge with a shell approximately 2–4 mm in length.

Young are preyed upon by crustaceans, horseshoe crabs, and fish, primarily drum species. Adult whelks are eaten by loggerhead sea turtles.

== Human use ==
As with conchs, the knobbed whelk is used by humans as food in such dishes as salads (raw), burgers, fritters, and chowders.

As is also true of conch shells, the shell of the knobbed whelk can be made into a natural bugle by cutting off the tip of the spire in order to form a mouthpiece.

Historically, American Indians used the knobbed whelk as a component in wampum, the shell beads exchanged in North America for trade.
