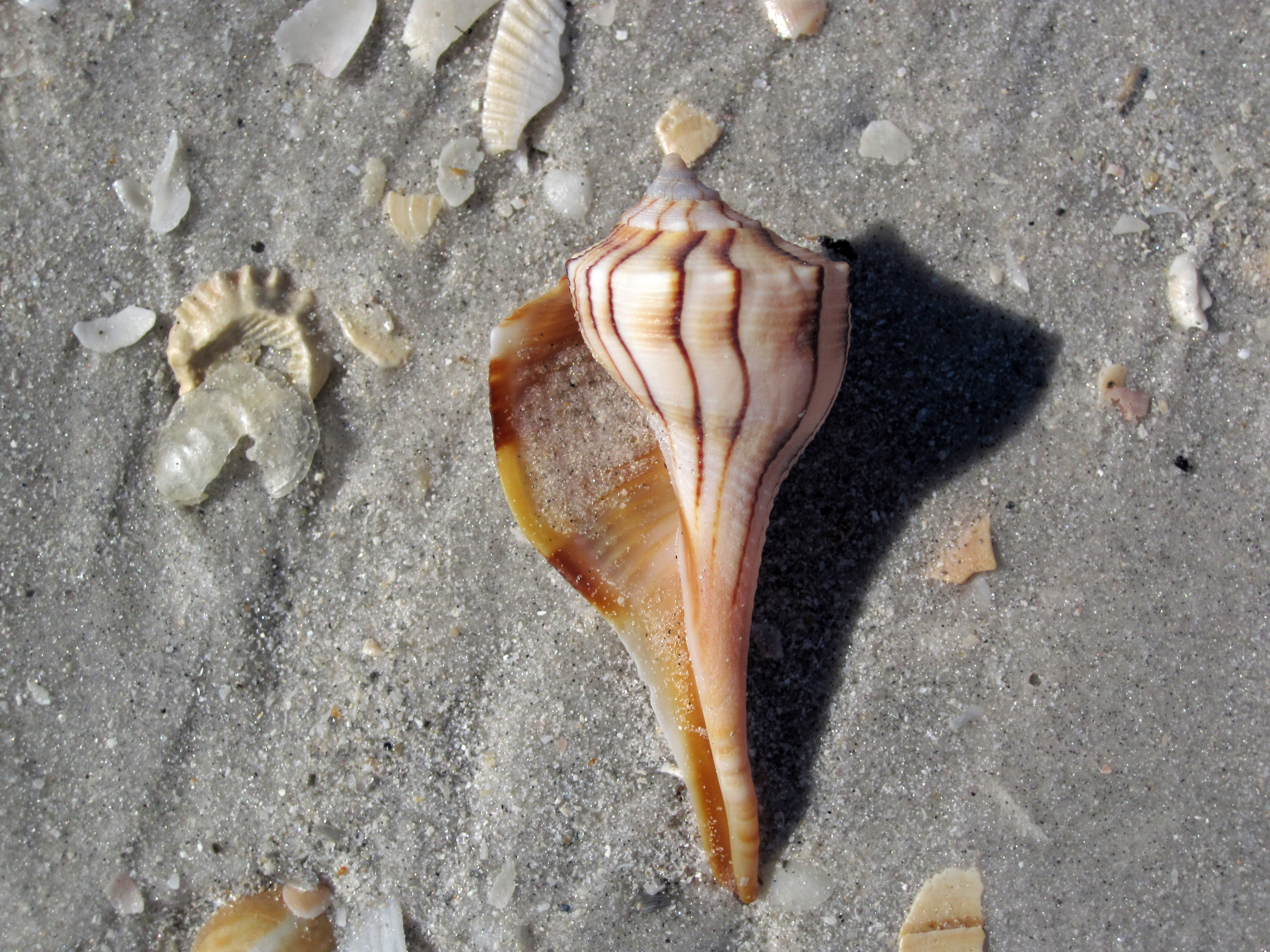
- Empty shell on Cayo Costa Island, Florida

Scientific classification
- Kingdom: Animalia
- Phylum: Mollusca
- Class: Gastropoda
- Subclass: Caenogastropoda
- Order: Neogastropoda
- Family: Busyconidae
- Genus: Sinistrofulgur
- Species: S. sinistrum

Binomial name
- Sinistrofulgur sinistrum (Hollister, 1958)

Synonyms
- Busycon (Sinistrofulgur) aspinosum Hollister, 1958; Busycon (Sinistrofulgur) sinistrum Hollister, 1958; Busycon perversum sinistrum Hollister, 1958; Busycon sinistrum Hollister, 1958

= Sinistrofulgur sinistrum =

Species of gastropod

Sinistrofulgur sinistrum is an edible species of large predatory sea snail in the family Busyconidae, the busycon whelks.

== Taxonomy ==
Sinistrofulgur sinistrum was named by S. C. Hollister in 1958, originally as Busycon (Sinistrofulgur) sinistrum. It had previously been included in the species Busycon contrarium, now known as Sinistrofulgur contrarium, but S. contrarium is now considered an exclusively fossil species. A study by Wise and colleagues in 2004 found that the level of genetic divergence between lightning whelk populations in different regions were low enough to be considered a single species with three subspecies, Busycon perversum perversum, B. perversum sinistrum, and B. perversum laeostomum. In contrast, in 2015 Petuch recognized four distinct species, including Sinistrofulgur sinistrum, distinguishing them by their range and shell morphology. As of 2024, Sinistrofulgur sinistrum is listed as an accepted species on MolluscaBase.

== Description ==
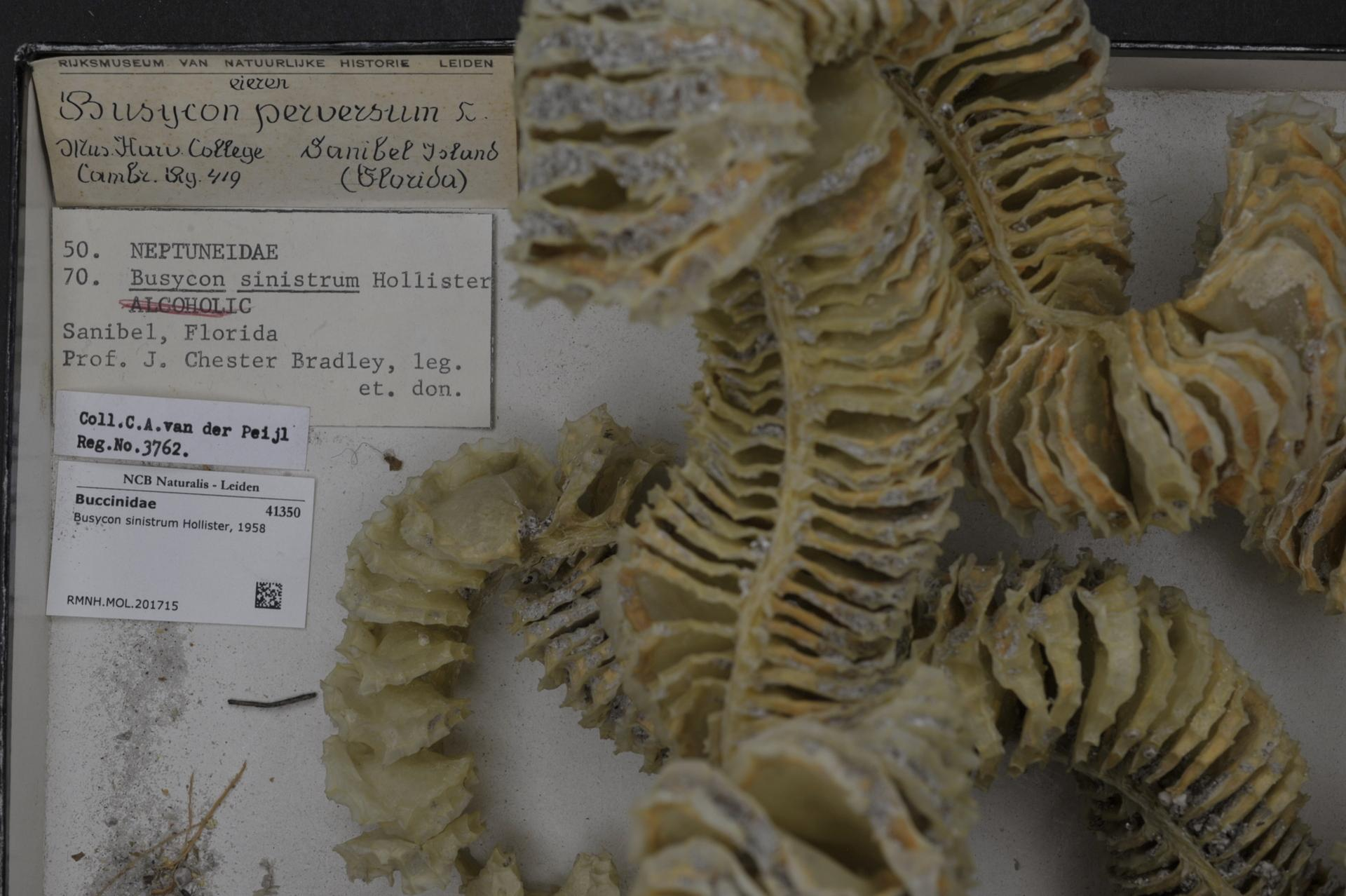
Museum specimen of the egg capsules

The size of the shell varies between 20 and 45 cm (7.9 and 17.7 in).

This species normally has a sinistral (left-handed) shell, thus the scientific name. (When the shell is held with the spiral end up, the opening is on the left side.) The spire is low and the siphonal canal is long. There is a distinct shoulder where the spire meets the body whorl; knobs of small to moderate size are found at the shoulder. The base color of the shell is variable but is usually pale, and the shell is marked with dark stripes that run down its long axis.

== Geographic range and distribution ==
This marine species occurs in the Gulf of Mexico, the Caribbean Sea, and the North Atlantic Ocean. They can also be found in shallow bays along the Texas Gulf Coast. It has been spotted along the Coastline from Florida to South Carolina and parts of North Carolina as well. Lightning Whelk are more frequent on the West coast of Florida than the East coast and due to their difference in location, they are unable to interact or reproduce with one another, which causes morphological difference between the two. Major mound sites for Lightning Whelk shells in the United States can be found at Moundsville Alabama, Etowah Georgia, Spiro Oklahoma, and other areas. They prefer sandy and muddy sea floors along shallow bays, seeking sunlight.

== Ecology ==
There are few predators noted for the lightning whelk. But, one noted predator was the box crab Calappa flammea. This species was noted as being a predator for the lightning whelk. The lightning whelk does not possess many predators due to its large size and the density of their shell. But, the lightning whelk is a predatory gastropod that feeds primarily on bivalve mollusks, such as clams, oysters, and mussels. One of its main prey is the Mercenaria mercenaria, commonly known as the hard clam. This gastropod is closely related to Sinistrofulgur sinistrum which has been studied to see if this is why these organisms have the predator-prey relationship. There is research being conducted to confirm if the evolution of Sinistrofulgur sinistrum is due to trying to keep up with its own dietary needs with the Mercenaria mercenaria.

== Reproduction ==
Sinistrofulgur sinistrum reproduce sexually. Males will deposit a sperm packet on the bottom of the foot, and the females, once fertilized, will lay eggs inside a series of protective capsules that are attached to each other by an egg-case string. Each series consists of as many as 175 egg capsules containing 20 to 100 eggs per capsule. The egg-case string is attached to the mud or sand by the mother. Once hatched, the juveniles will exit through a capsule port in the egg capsule. Because they are carnivores throughout their entire lives, the juvenile S. sinistrum will feed on unhatched eggs before leaving its capsule.

== Economic importance ==
The early periods, around 3000 BC, marked the use of lightning whelk shells as ceremonial objects in the Southeast regions, encompassing the Gulf of Mexico and the lower Atlantic Coast. These shells held economic significance for coastal communities due to their spirality. They were utilized by Native Americans in ritualistic practices and architectural endeavors.

In Native American rituals, the spirals of the lightning whelk were associated with celestial elements such as the sun and fire, as well as purification rituals. Although not directly involved in the making of the “black drink” consumed before battles or important events, lightning whelk shells were used to store the beverage when necessary. Fire was revered as a representation of the sun on earth, and the circular direction of the marine shell symbolized the dances performed by the Native Americans. Clockwise dances mirrored the sun’s perilous path toward death, while counterclockwise dances symbolized life and allowed for healing rituals and women’s dances. Creek medicine men would start blessing or doctoring a house from the north and proceed in the counterclockwise direction around its perimeter. Architecturally, lighting whelk shells were incorporated into cups and ceramic vessels. Cups were specifically designed for the consumption of the “black drink”, central to ritualistic practices. Ceramic vessels often imitated lightning whelk cups and depicted the apical structures of natural shells.

Overall, the use of lightning whelk shells in both ritualistic and architectural contexts underscores their profound cultural importance to Native American communities during this early period, serving as tangible expressions of spiritual beliefs and societal customs.
