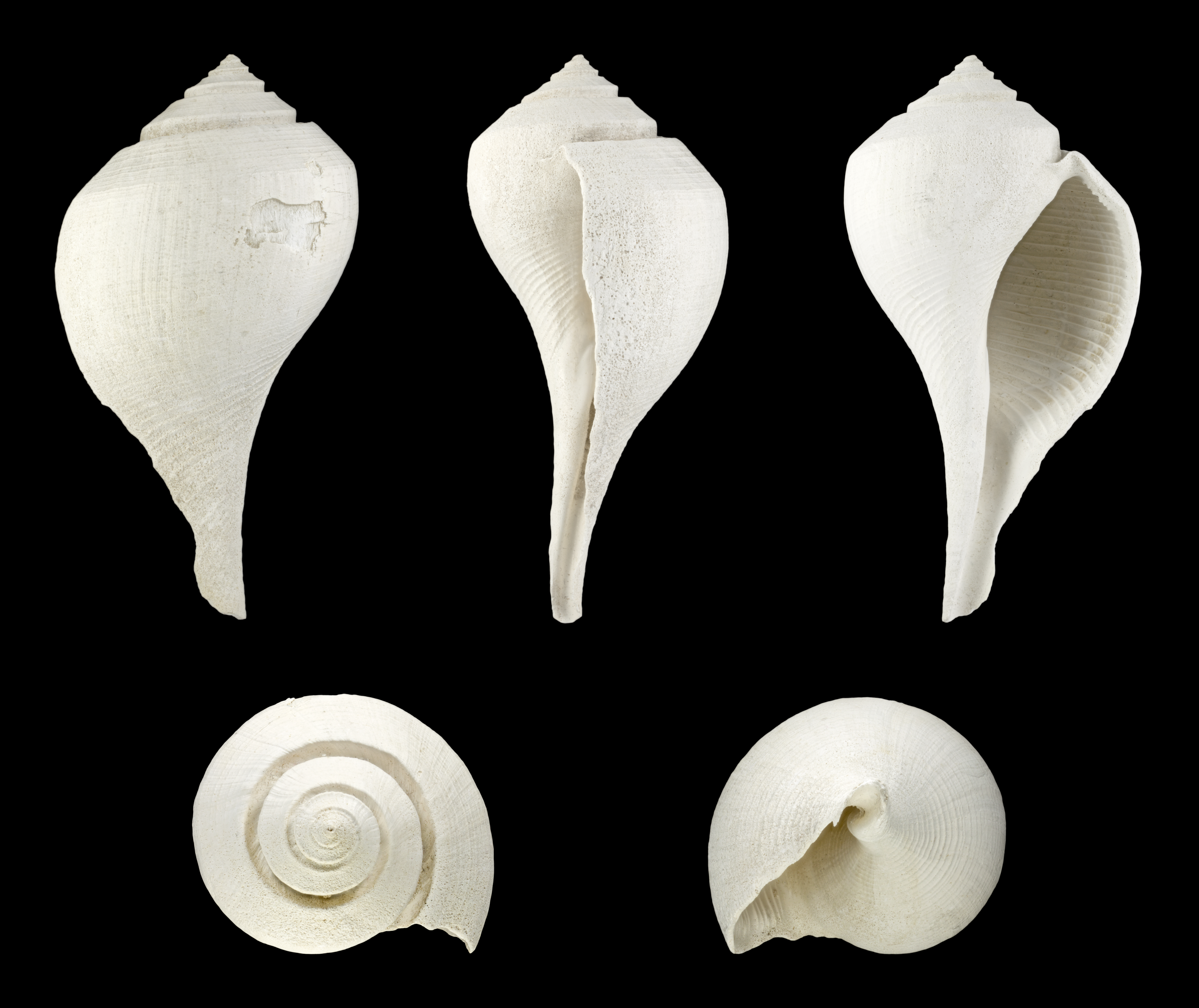
- The pear whelk fulguropsis spirata

Scientific classification
- Kingdom: Animalia
- Phylum: Mollusca
- Class: Gastropoda
- Subclass: Caenogastropoda
- Order: Neogastropoda
- Superfamily: Buccinoidea
- Family: Busyconidae; Wade, 1917 (1867)

= Busyconidae =

Family of gastropods

The Busyconidae are taxonomic family of large sea snails, often known as whelks.

== Subfamilies ==
- Busyconinae Wade, 1917 (1867)
- Busycotypinae Petuch, 1994
  - Busycotypus Wenz, 1943
  - Fulguropsis Marks, 1950
