= Choctaw Sea =

Cenozoic eutropical subsea

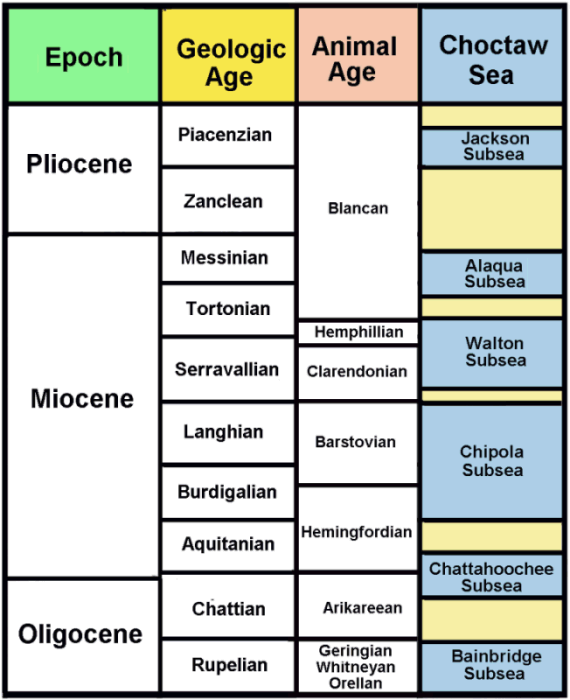
Table displaying the Choctaw Sea and its relation to geologic time and North American Land Mammal Ages. Dry periods or marine regressive periods are tan in color.

The Choctaw Sea was a Cenozoic eutropical subsea, which along with the Okeechobean Sea, occupied the eastern Gulf of Mexico basin system bounding Florida.

== Location ==
The Choctaw Sea was named for the Choctaw or Choctawhatchee River of northern Oligocene Florida. It occupied most of the Florida Panhandle including the river deltas of the Choctawhatchee River, Apalachicola River, and Ochlockonee River. At its maximum coverage it encompassed an area as far north as the city of Bainbridge in Southwest Georgia and as far to the southeast as Taylor County, Florida, United States.

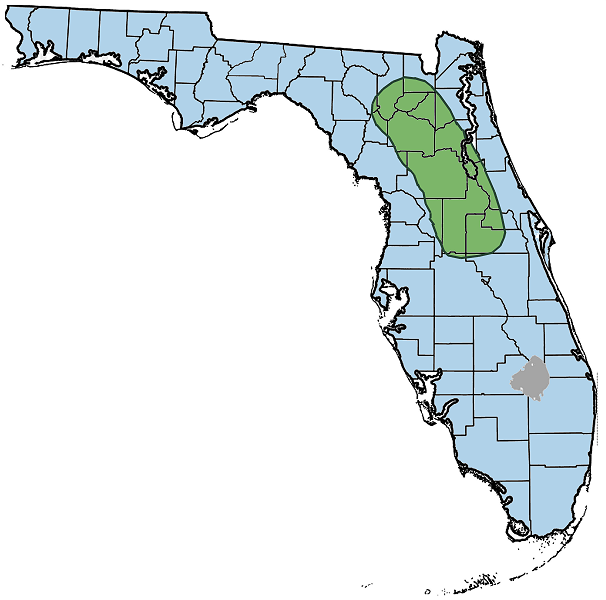
Depiction of Oligocene Orange Island which was the first emerging landmass.

The Choctaw Sea was divided further into two groups of three sub-seas based upon marine fauna. These sub-seas were named:

- Bainbridge Subsea
- Chattahoochie Subsea
- Chipola Subsea
- Walton Subsea
- Alaqua Subsea
- Jackson Subsea

== Subseas ==
=== Bainbridge Subsea ===
- Period: Oligocene.
- Geologic stage: Rupelian through early Chattian. ~33.9—28.4 Ma (beginning approximately 33.9 million years ago).
- Animal age: Orellan through Geringian. ~33.9—26.3 Ma.
- Post-Bainbridge dry period: Chattian ~28.4—23.03 Ma.

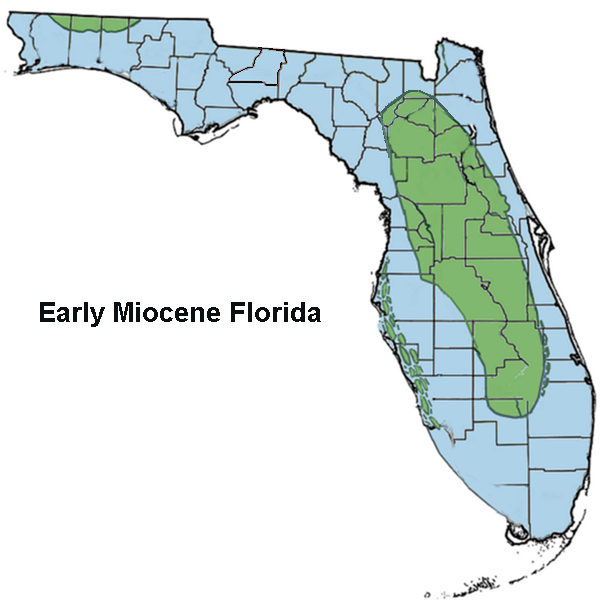
Orange Island lengthens and gets wider, the Gulf Trough is shallower and more narrow.

The Bainbridge Subsea was named for the fossil beds of Bainbridge, Georgia and is the oldest subsea. This period spanned the existence of the Gulf Trough between Georgia and Florida's Orange Island. It was a warm but cooling climate, moving towards an ice age. The Suwannee Limestone was established during this time. Basilosaurus cetoides and Zygorhiza, early toothed whales, as well as Protosiren, an extinct ancestor of the Manatee, inhabit these waters and are the earliest mammal fossils uncovered with specimens from Citrus County in dolomite ~40—37 Ma. and Marion County, Florida dating from 37.2—33.9 Ma.

=== Chattahoochee Subsea ===
- Period: Miocene.
- Geologic stage: Late Chattian through early Aquitanian ~28.4—23.03 Ma., approximately 5.37 million years.
- Animal age: Arikareean. ~30.8—20.6 Ma.
- Post-Chattahoochee dry period: Late Aquitanian through early Burdigian ~23.0—20.5 Ma.

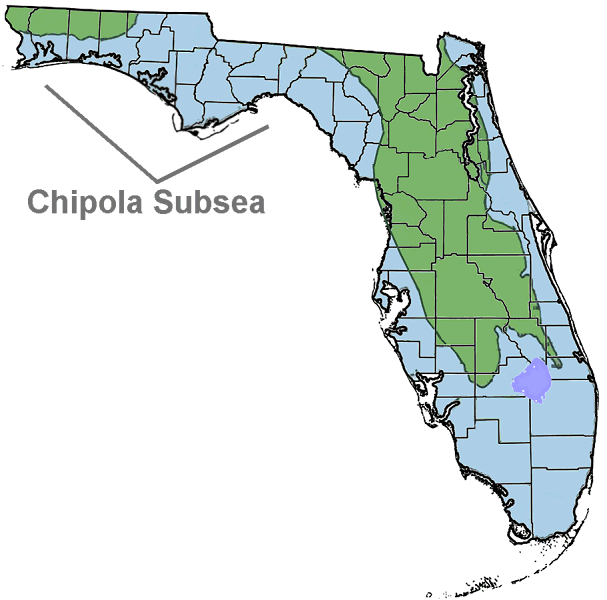
The Chipola Subsea from the Burdigalian through Langhian development of Florida.

The Chattahoochee Subsea was named for the Chattahoochee Formation which formed during the rise in sea level. The Chattahoochie Subsea was much smaller in size than the Bainbridge and during the filling of the Chattahoochee, the St. Marks Formation of limestone and sand was established. The Gulf Trough closed between Georgia and Florida forming the complete Florida peninsula allowing land animals to move southward. The fossil record shows that land animals entered the newly formed peninsula ~24.8 Ma.

=== Chipola Subsea ===
- Period: Miocene.
- Stage: Early Burdigalian through the late Langhian ~20.43—15.97 Ma., approximately 4.46 million years.
- Animal age: Hemingfordian through Barstovian ~20.3—13.6 Ma.
- Post-Chipola dry period: Early Serravallian ~13.65—12.0 Ma.

The Chipola Subsea was named after the Chipola Formation and was formerly known as the Chipola Sea. It was created by rising sea level flooding the area once again. The Torreya Formation, a geologic formation extending from Gadsden to Hamilton County was established during this period. A somewhat narrow land bridge exists with a width from Madison County to Duval County, Florida extending into Georgia. The Middle Miocene Disruption, an extinction of many mammal genera begins.

A very short dry period follows the Chipola lasting possibly 1 million years. During the time the Middle Miocene Disruption continues. Forests slowly draw in massive amounts of carbon dioxide, gradually lowering the level of atmospheric CO_{2} from 650 ppmv down to around 100 ppmv.

=== Walton Subsea ===
- Period: Miocene.
- Geologic stage: Early Serravallian through early Tortonian ~12.00—7.2 Ma., approximately 4.8 million years.
- Animal age: Clarendonian ~13.6—10.3 Ma through Hemphillian ~10.3—4.9 Ma.
- Post-Walton dry period: Early Tortonian ~10.0—9.0 Ma.

The Walton Subsea was named for the fossil beds of Walton County.

=== Alaqua Subsea ===
- Period: Miocene.
- Geologic time period: Mid Tortonian through mid Messinian ~7.246—5.332 Ma., approximately 1.914 million years.
- Animal age: Hemphillian ~10.3—4.9 Ma.

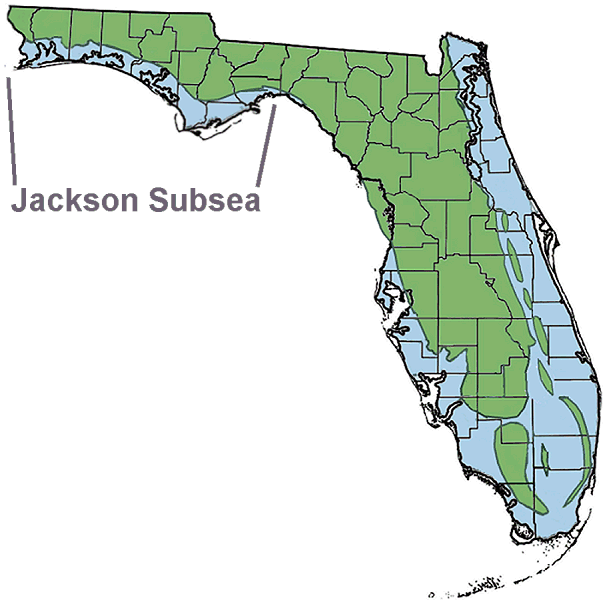
Pliocene-Pleistocene Florida displaying the remnants of the Jackson Subsea heading toward post-Jackson dry period.

- Post-Alaqua dry period: The late Messinian through Zanclean ~5.332—3.6 Ma.

The Alaqua Subsea was named for the fossil beds found along Alaqua Creek, Walton County. The period of time after the Alaqua experienced a somewhat long dry period. A major event was the Messinian salinity crisis or dry Mediterranean. It was replenished with the Zanclean flood which raised the world-wide sea level 10 meters or 33 feet.

=== Jackson Subsea ===
- Period: Pliocene through Pleistocene.
- Geologic time period: Piacenzian through Blancan ~3.600—2.588 Ma., approximately 1.012 million years.
- Animal age: Blancan ~4.9—1.8 Ma.
- Post-Jackson dry period: Piacenzian through Holocene ~2.588 Ma. —present. The Northern Hemisphere is in a full ice age with its final retreat around 11,000 years ago.

The Jackson Subsea was named after the Jackson Bluff Formation and formerly called the "Jackson Sea." It was created during the rise in sea level during the Pliocene. During this period the last glacial period known as the Wisconsin ice age begins.
