= Okeechobean Sea =

Cenozoic eutropical subsea

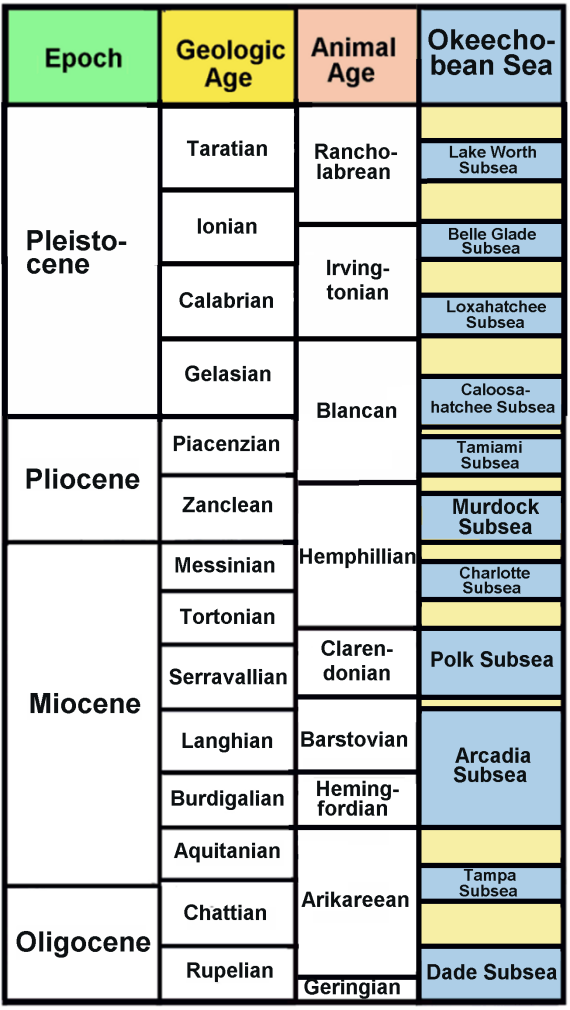
Table displaying the Okeechobean Sea and its relation to geologic time and North American Land Mammal Ages. Dry periods or marine regressive periods are tan in color.

The Okeechobean Sea was a Cenozoic eutropical subsea, which along with the Choctaw Sea, occupied the eastern Gulf of Mexico basin system bounding Florida.

== Location ==
The Okeechobean Sea was named for Lake Okeechobee of southern Early Oligocene Florida. It occupied southern Florida from what is now Tampa, Florida, to the Kissimmee River and to Martin County on the east and southward across the Everglades to the tip of Florida. The Okeechobean (including its subseas) survived until the Pleistocene making it the longest-lived paleosea in eastern North America.

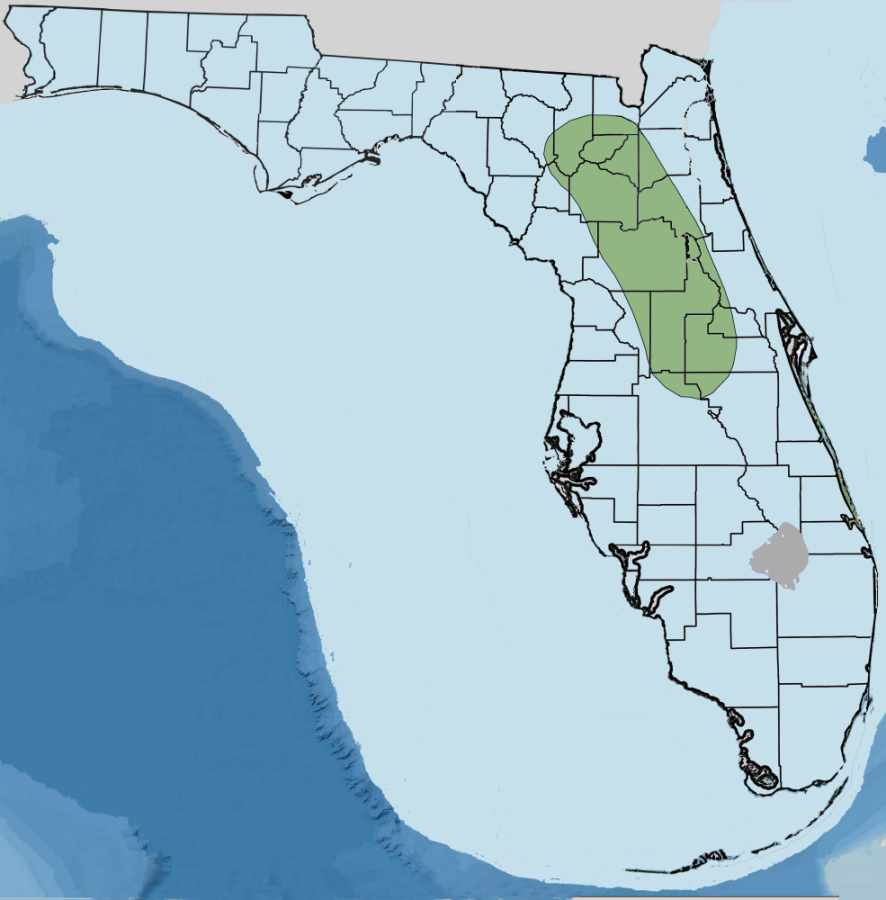
Depiction of Early Oligocene (Rupelian) Orange Island which was the first emerging landmass of Florida.

The Okeechobean Sea was divided further into two groups of a combined 10 subseas based upon marine fauna. These subseas were named:

- Dade Subsea
- Tampa Subsea
- Arcadia Subsea
- Murdock Subsea
- Tamiami Subsea
- Charlotte Subsea
- Caloosahatchee Subsea
- Laxahatchee Subsea
- Lake Worth Subsea
- Belle Glade Subsea

== Subseas ==
=== Dade Subsea ===
- Period: Oligocene (complete).
- Geologic stage: Rupelian through early Chattian. ~33.9—28.4 Ma., approximately ~5.5 million years.
- Animal age: Orellan through Geringian. ~33.9—26.3 Ma.
- Post-Dade dry period: ~28.0—23 Ma. A moderate icehouse climate followed by an ice age lasting most of the Chattian ~28.4—23.03 Ma.

The Dade Subsea was named for Dade County, Florida fossil reefs and is contemporary with the Bainbridge Subsea of North Florida. It is the last platform created from carbonate deposits and the predecessor of the recent Florida peninsula. It was formed out of the meteor impacts and tsunamis of the colder Eocene. By the mid Rupelian, the global climate warms and Florida consists of just Orange Island, a somewhat long island with coral reefs extending as far north as Alabama and Georgia forming the Salt Mountain formation and Flint River Formation respectively. Along its west coast lay the Pasco Reef System. separated from the mainland by the Gulf Trough or Suwannee Strait also with coral reefs. Orange Island lay just 150 km (93 mi) from Georgia. Two deep carbonate features will eventually become the substructure of the Everglades.

Basilosaurus cetoides and Zygorhiza, early toothed whales, as well as Protosiren, an extinct ancestor of the manatee, inhabit these waters and are the earliest mammal fossils uncovered with specimens from Citrus County in dolomite dating to ~40—37 Ma. and Marion County, Florida dating from 37.2—33.9 Ma.

=== Tampa Subsea ===
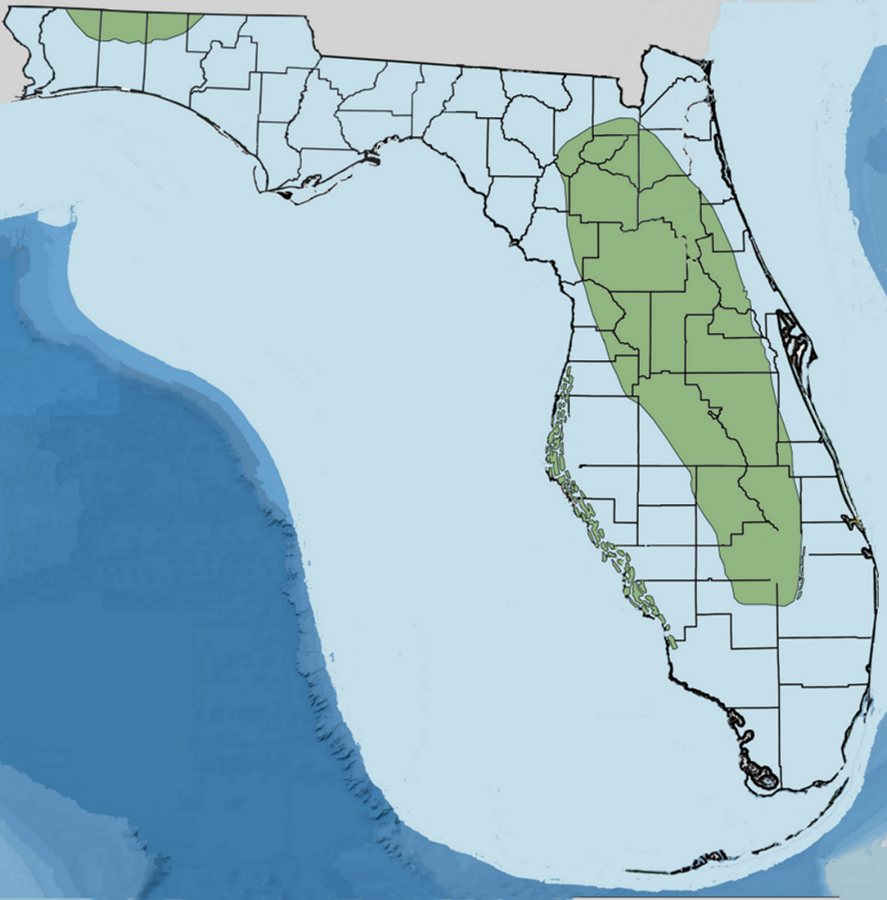
Oligocene Orange Island with Hillsborough Lagoon System on the west and Caloosahatchee Lagoon System on the east.

- Period: Late Oligocene—Early Miocene.
- Geologic stage: Chattian through early Aquitanian stage of the Miocene ~28.4—23.03 Ma., approximately 5.37 million years.
- Animal age: Arikareean. ~30.8—20.6 Ma.
- Post-Tampa dry period: Late Aquitanian through early Burdigian ~23.0—20.5 Ma.

The Tampa Subsea was named for the Tampa, Florida and reef system. It is contemporary with the Chattahoochee Subsea in the Florida Panhandle. During this period, Orange Island grew in size toward the west and north while the Gulf Trough or Suwannee Strait narrowed and became shallower. On Orange Island's western side, upwelling systems were taking place with a system of lagoons and coral islands not unlike the Florida Keys evolving. In what would become the Everglades, the carbonate banks grew and the area became shallower.

The Gulf Trough closed between Georgia and Florida forming the complete peninsula allowing southward movement of Florida's first land mammals such as the early canids Enhydrocyon, Osbornodon, and Phlaocyon preying upon the proto-horse Miohippus, deer-like Hypertragulidae, and the extinct camel, Nothokemas. The fossil record shows that land animals entered the newly formed peninsula with the earliest land mammals unearthed in Hernando, County dating from ~24.8 Ma.

=== Arcadia Subsea ===
- Period: Miocene.
- Geologic stage: Burdigalian through early Serravallian stages ~20.43—13.6 Ma., approximately 6.83 million years.
- Animal age: Hemingfordian through Barstovian ~20.3—13.6 Ma.
- Post-Arcadia dry period:' Early Serravallian ~13.65—12.0 Ma.

The Arcadia Subsea was named after the Arcadia Formation and is contemporary with the Chipola Subsea to the north in the panhandle. During this period, the Florida peninsula forms as the Gulf Trough closes in the north and fills with mangrove forests. South of what was Orange Island and is now the peninsula's tip, was a deep water lagoon with many banks made of oyster bars and coral reefs. The largest bank was located on its southwest. Also by this time, phytoplankton blooms along the western coast poured into the Arcadia Subsea. The Middle Miocene Climatic Optimum of ~16 Ma. carbon dioxide and a climate change increases, warming the planet. The Middle Miocene disruption, an extinction of many mammal genera begins.

The Arcadia begins to regress with a very short dry period lasting possibly 1 million years. During this time the Middle Miocene Disruption continues. Forests slowly draw in massive amounts of carbon dioxide, gradually lowering the level of atmospheric CO_{2} to approximately 100 ppmv.

Metaxytherium floridanum a form of manatee, and long beaked dolphin (Pomatodelphis) swam this subsea. The fossil of Mesoplodon longirostris is found on the Miami Terrace dating to ~15.97—11.61 Ma.

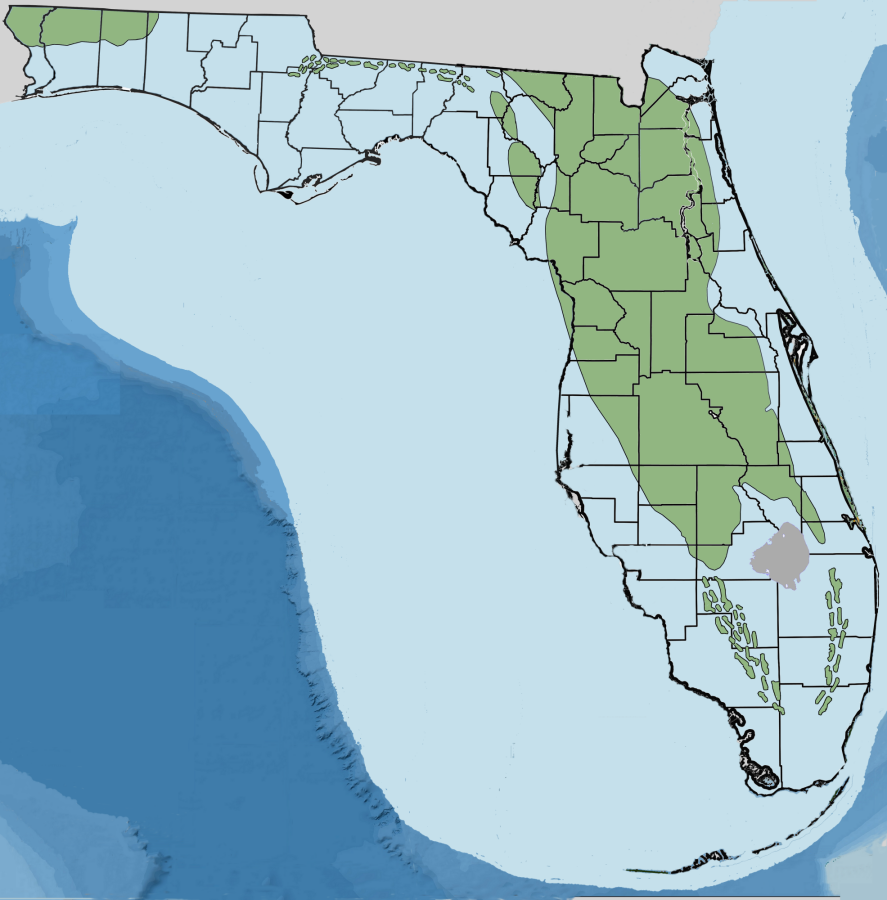
Burdigian through Langhian stage of Miocene Florida. Gulf Trough is filled and Florida connected with the mainland.

=== Polk Subsea ===
- Period: Middle Miocene.
- Geologic stage: Late Serravallian through early Tortonian ~12.00—11.6 Ma., approximately 0.4 million years.
- Animal age: Clarendonian ~13.6—10.3 Ma through Hemphillian ~10.3—4.9 Ma.
- Post-Polk dry period: Early Tortonian, approximately ~11.6—9.0 Ma.

The Polk Subsea was named for the rich fossil beds of Polk County, Florida and contemporary with the Walton Subsea. During this rather short period of time of 400,000 years, the peninsula's southwestern edge develops a shallow yet broad lagoon system. Near western DeSoto County, erosion creates water-filled sinkholes and rivers with sediments from this erosion enhancing the carbonate bank on the southwest and producing large oyster bioherms along the seaward side of the lagoon system as well as banks to the south. The upwelling of nutrients and phytoplankton of the Arcadia Subsea continued and increased eventually flooding the lagoon system and Okeechobee Basin and contributing to the building of the Peace River Formation.

Sperm whale (Kogiopsis floridana), 9.1—9.0 Ma. Fossil specimen found in the Amalgamated Phosphate Mine; Brewster Phosphate Mine, Polk County, Florida.

=== Charlotte Subsea ===
- Period: Late Miocene.
- Geologic stage: Late Tortonian through early Messinian ~8.0—6.0 Ma. ± (500,000 years either side), approximately 2 million years.
- Animal age: Hemphillian ~10.3—4.9 Ma.
- Post-Charlotte dry period: The late Messinian through Zanclean ~5.332—3.6 Ma. experienced a somewhat long dry period. A major event was the Messinian salinity crisis or dry Mediterranean. It was replenished with the Zanclean flood which raised the worldwide sea level 10 meters or 33 feet.

The Charlotte Subsea was named for the fossil beds found in Charlotte County, Florida. A rather short-lived subsea, during this period the rivers and lakes of the DeSoto Plain are complete and produce vast quantities of sediment deposited in the Okeechobee Basin. The banks on the western side of the Charlotte Subsea force material southward producing the DeSoto Delta. This delta filled in approximately 50% of the western Okeechobee Basin producing a platform.

Fossils of the beaked whale, river dolphin, and a form of toothed whale (Kentriodontidae) dating to ~7.9—7.8 Ma. are uncovered in Polk County.

=== Murdock Subsea ===
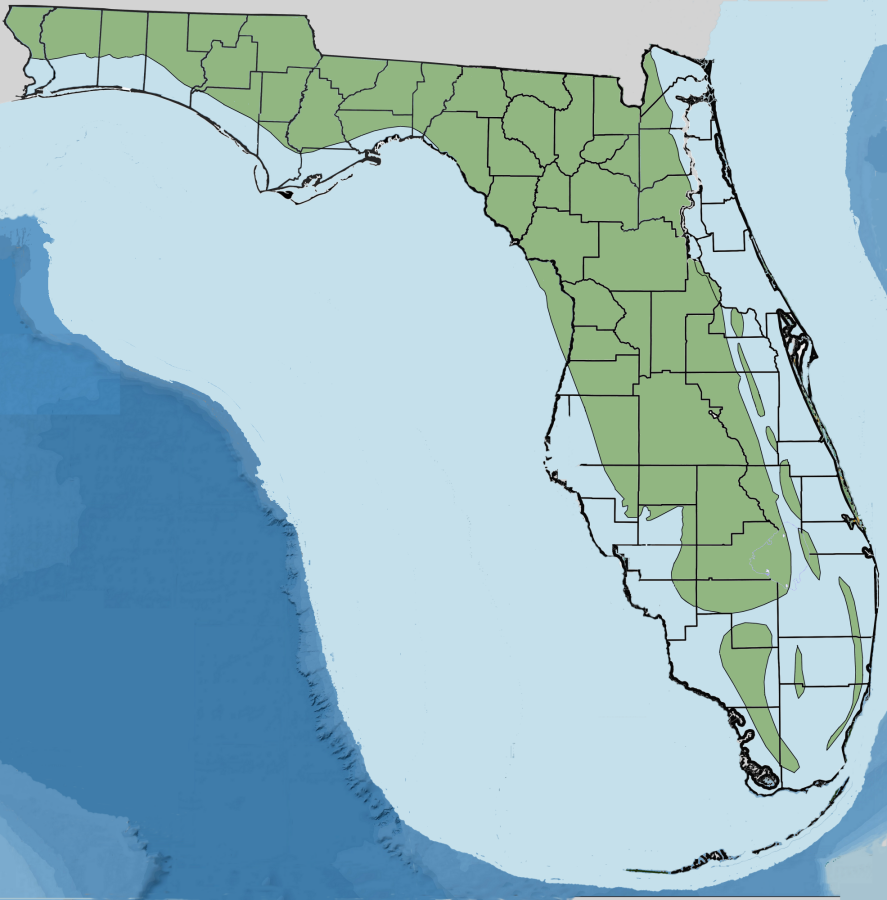
Tamiami Subsea 3.6 to 2.5 million years ago.

- Period: Early to mid Pliocene.
- Geologic stage: Early Zanclean. ~5.332—3.6 Ma., approximately 1.732 million years.
- Animal age: Late Hemphillian through late Blancan ~4.9—1.8 Ma.
- Post-Murdock dry period: Piacenzian through Holocene ~2.588 Ma. —present. The Northern Hemisphere is in a full ice age which begins to retreat around 11,000 years ago.

The Murdock Subsea was named after Murdock Station Formation and followed the worldwide cooling and sea level lowering of the Messinian stage. This period is the last one of delta creation upwelling and one of fast erosion in Florida with sediments quite rapidly flowing into the Everglades area creating what is known as the Immokolee Delta. The Okeechobean Sea flooded again creating the Murdock Subsea and covering the Immokolee Delta which disbursed its sediments further south into the glades. What remained was a long deep water feature on the eastern side of the Murdock. Upwelling with plankton blooms continued along the west coast supporting well as oysters and similar animals.

Balaenoptera floridana and Delphinidae were found in Lee County. and Bone Valley Formation.

=== Tamiami Subsea ===
- Period: Pliocene.
- Geologic stage: Late Zanclean through late Piacenzian, ~3.6—2.588 Ma., approximately 1.012 million years.
- Animal age: Blancan
- Post-Tamiami dry period: The Northern Hemisphere moves into Wisconsin Ice Age.

The Tamiami Subsea is named after the Tamiami Formation. This period is marked by a warming climate and one in which produced tropical conditions in Florida. Upwelling of cooler, nutrient rich water halted and the Okeechobee Basin returned to evolving through carbonate sedimentation with both Immokolee and DeSoto deltas now were covered and looking similar to the Bahama Banks.

During the Tamiami Subsea's creation, the basin of the Everglades was encompassed by the Everglades Pseudoatoll. This feature's north side supported mangrove jungles and estuaries extending to the mainland and Kissimmee Embayment. The east, west, and south were created by reefs and islands of over 100 species of coral which grew atop the Hawthornian oyster and barnacle bars. The Nashua Lagoon System extends along the entire east coast of Florida.

=== Caloosahatchee Subsea ===
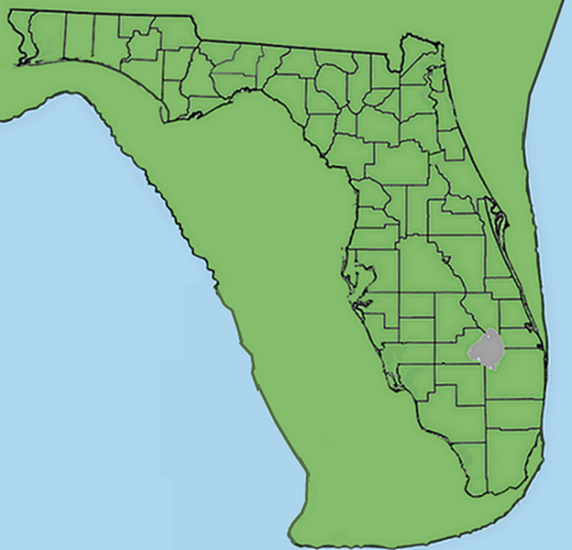
Florida during the Calabrian glaciation of 2.5 million years ago.

- Period: Pliocene to Pleistocene.
- Geologic stage: Late Piacenzian ~2.8 Ma. to late Calabrian ~780,000, approximately 1.8 million years.
- Animal age: Blancan to Irvingtonian ~4.9 Ma.—240,000 years ago.

The Caloosahatchee Subsea was named for the Caloosahatchee Formation. During this period, the Tamiami Psedoatoll feature of islands and reefs became wider and the marine environment was shallower and more of a connected lagoon system. The west and south of the Okeechobean was covered with mangrove.

During the late Calabrian, ~1.8 Ma.—780,000 years ago, temperatures plunged to that or possibly colder than the Messinian-Zanclean with the Caloosahatchee basin rising and filling with rock and mineral deposits. All of the paleoseas experienced mass extinction of endemic species.

=== Loxahatchee Subsea ===
- Period: Pleistocene.
- Geologic stage: Pre-Illinoian ~2.427—1.816 Ma., approximately 0.611 million years.
- Animal age: Blancan ~4.9—1.8 Ma.
- Post-Loxahatchee dry period: Pre-Illinoian ~1.8 Ma.—302,000 years ago.

The Loxahatchee Subsea was named after the Loxahatchee Formation. The Pre-Illinoian began as a general warming from the frigid late Calabrian stage yet contained several ice ages and interglacials of its own. During one of several Pre-Illinoian glaciations, the Loxahatchee Subsea then consisted of a freshwater lake called Lake Immokolee filled with calcarenite charaphytes and siliclastic material from what would eventually be the Kissimmee River. It was approximately four times the size of Lake Okeechobee and existed until the next interglacial.

The Okeechobean Sea experienced the last deposits of sediments allowing the Loxahatchee Subsea as well as the Kissimmee Valley and Okeechobee Plain to fill and become 50% covered with mangrove forests. This new Loxahatchee Subsea was filled with mangrove islands. The mangrove islands of southwest Florida are reduced to coastal swamps. On the eastern side of the new Loxahatchee Subsea, reefs became wide islands covered with pines and palmettos with deep water surrounding them. A lagoon was created on the east with warmer water than surrounding water creating a refuge for corals and mollusks which became extinct along the eastern U.S. coastline.

In the west, Immokolee Island had been created from banks and reefs. To the east lay Miccosukee Island south of where Lake Okeechobee is currently. The Tomeu Islands were near future western Palm Beach County All three islands were covered with pine and palmetto forests. Flanking the Tomeu Islands on the west was the Capeletti Reef Tract. The southeastern and Atlantic facing part of the peninsula supported the Miami and Palm Beach Archipelagos. Connected and to the south of that and what would be the future Florida Keys was the Monroe Reef Tract.

=== Belle Glade Subsea ===
- Period: Pleistocene.
- Geologic stage: Illinoian ~300,000—75,000 years ago.
- Animal age: Irvingtonian to Rancholabrean ~1.8 Ma.—11,000 years ago.
- Post-Belle Glade dry period: Illinoian glaciation. ~300,000—130,000 years ago.

The Belle Glade Subsea was named after Belle Glade, Florida and lasted ~300,000 to 75,000 years ago, a period of ~0.225 million years. During this time the Okeechobean Sea locality was much shallower than previous. Geologic features were greatly enlarged compared with the aforementioned Loxahatchee Subsea. Islands and mangrove forests filled 75% of the Okeechobean basin.

=== Lake Worth Subsea ===
- Period: Pleistocene.
- Geologic stage: Late Sangamonian through late Illinoian ~300,000—75,000 years ago.
- Animal age: Irvingtonian to Rancholabrean ~1.8 Ma.—11,000 years ago.
- Post-Lake Worth dry period: Wisconsin glaciation, ~110,000—9,700 years ago.

The Lake Worth Subsea was named for Lake Worth Formation and lasted from ~300,000—75,000 years ago, a period of 0.225 million years. The eastern lagoon of Okeechobean Sea had filled in with sands, quartz, and carbonates. A series of keys extended along the continental shelf to almost Key West. Oolite was created behind reef sections from pounding seas originating off of Africa due to a submerged Bahamas Bank.

The Lake Worth Subsea was the last flooding stage of this area. It regressed during the Wisconsin Ice Age and infilled to become a shallow basin creating the Everglades.
