= Orange Island (Florida) =

Orange Island is the earliest emergent landmass of Florida dating from the middle Rupelian ~33.9—28.4 Ma. geologic stage of the Early Oligocene epoch and named for Orange County, Florida, United States of America.

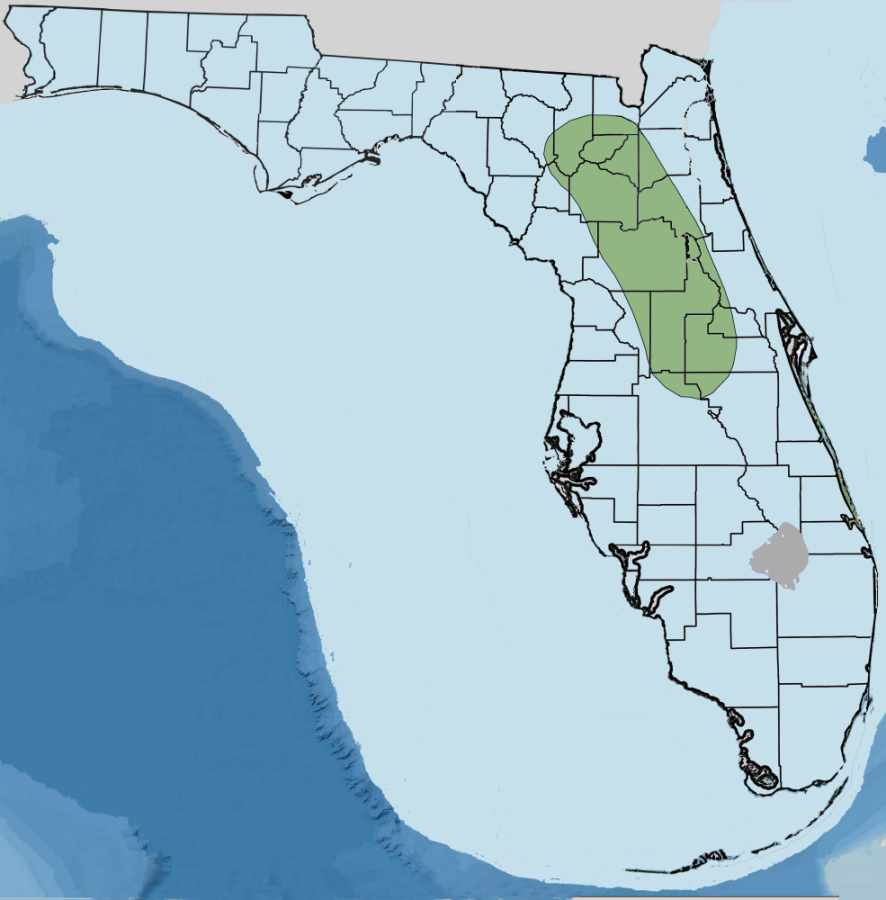
Depiction of mid (Rupelian) Early Oligocene Orange Island.

== Location ==
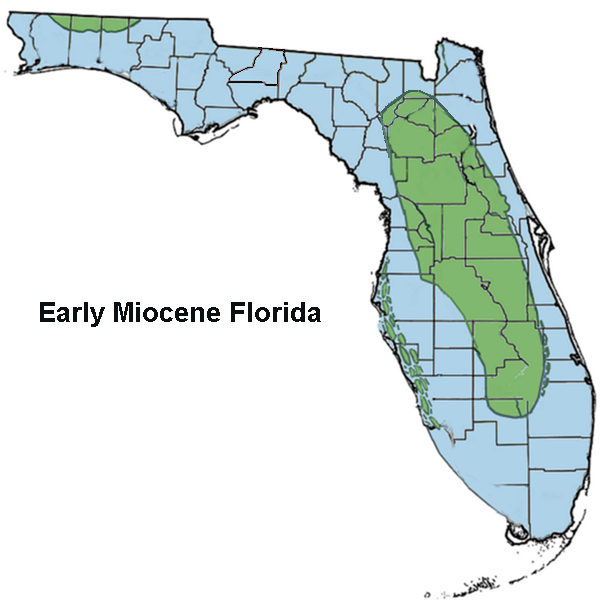
Orange Island with Hillsborough Lagoon System on the west and Caloosahatchee Lagoon System on the east.

Orange Island's general location is east of or on the eastern part of the Ocala Platform running north to south. Edward J. Petuch states that Orange Island was a dominant geomorphological feature of the Bainbridge Subsea on the Florida Platform According to J. R. Bryan and the United States Geological Survey, a lack of deposition with reference to the eastern side of the Ocala Platform indicates this area as Orange Island. The island also bounded the Okeechobean Sea to its south.

== Origins ==
During the warm Eocene ~55.8—33.9 Ma., what was to become Florida (Florida Platform) was a carbonate bank with shallow sea covering it. During the Eocene, biological carbonates were deposited on this bank forming various layers. The Avon Park Formation and Ocala Limestone were formed at this time. Orange Island appears absent of Suwannee Limestone due to either erosion or lack of deposition of material.(J. R. Bryan).

=== Birth of Orange Island ===
By the Early Oligocene, sea levels rose almost as much as during the late Eocene. Parts of the platform remained above water creating Orange Island, a low relief island just 150 km (93 mi) south of the Oligocene Georgia coastline and Bainbridge Subsea with a shallow channel, the Gulf Trough or Suwannee Strait, separating the two. The shallower Gulf Trough now supported a large coral reef extending to the Salt Mountain Formation and Flint River Formation of southern Alabama to Mitchell County, Georgia. The western side of the island was bounded by the Pasco Reef System, an environment now only found in the southern Pacific Ocean (Petuch).

During the middle Oligocene ~25 Ma, a worldwide cooling of the climate started the drying of the Dade Subsea, Gulf Trough, and in turn enlarging Orange Island. During the Chattian of the Late Oligocene, land mammals began their movement into what is now Florida with earliest of their fossils found in Hernando County dating to 24.8 Ma. Also from that Chattian stage through early Aquitanian age of the early Miocene, Orange Island expanded both northward and westward with carbonate lagoon system on its west side. To the south of Orange Island, the Everglades Basin remained at 250 meters (850 feet) deep. Orange Island had its own rivers carrying sediments composed of sand and clay in to the Yeehaw Strait at Orange Island's southern tip.

Orange Island appears to have been a Pleistocene animal and floral refugium for central Florida during the interglacial periods of rising water and not unlike that of the river bank of the Apalachicola River, the red hills near Marianna, Florida, and coastal flatwoods in the Florida panhandle.
