= Gulf Coastal Lowlands =

Geologic area of Florida, US

The Gulf Coastal Lowlands is a geomorphological province in Florida. The province extends along the coast of the Gulf of Mexico from the western end of the Florida Panhandle to near Ft. Myers in southern Florida. The average width of the province is 40 km. While much of the province is less than 15 m above mean sea level (msl), it rises to about 100 feet (30 m) above msl along its inland side. It is the largest province in Florida. Due to its low elevation, the province was at sea level during warmer periods of the Pliocene and Pleistocene, and features such as ancient dunes and sand bars are found far inland. Marine terraces found in the Gulf Coastal Lowlands include the Silver Bluff terrace, 1 to 10 feet (0.30 to 3.05 m) above mean sea level (msl), Pamlico terrace, 8 to 25 feet (2.4 to 7.6 m) above msl, Talbot terrace 25 feet (7.6 m) to 42 feet (13 m) above msl, Penholoway terrace, 42 to 72 feet (13 to 22 m) above msl, and Wicomico terrace, 70 to 100 feet (21 to 30 m) above msl.

The Gulf Coastal Lowlands include lagoons, barrier islands, coastal swamps and marshes and drowned coastal karst (Big Bend Coast) along the coast. Features of the Gulf Coastal Lowlands include the Desoto Plain, Wakulla Hills, Woodville Karst Plain, Tates Hell Swamp, Lake Munson Hills, Beacon Slope, Fountain Slope and Greenhead Slope.
