= Everglades Pseudoatoll =

Geomorphic feature of southern Florida during the Pliocene epoch

The Everglades Pseudoatoll (also called a pseudo-atoll) was a major geomorphic feature of southern Florida during the Pliocene epoch.

== Origin ==
The Everglades Pseudoatoll began its growth during the early Eocene as a paleodepression possibly created by an asteroid impact upon the carbonate Florida Platform at the southern part of what is now Everglades National Park. The pseudo-atoll is surrounded by a raised rim. Its growth as a reef system and pseudo-atoll began during the Oligocene reaching its maximum size of 330 km (210 mi) north to south during the Piacenzian of the late Pliocene. (Petuch, 163).

== Description ==
The Everglades Pseudoatoll was a U-shaped asymmetrical system of reefs that surrounded the Okeechobean Sea, not unlike South Pacific atolls surrounded by a central lagoon. The west side was more developed than the east and south, as was the remainder of the west side.

On the western side of this pseudo-atoll lay the Immokalee Reef Tract and chain of islands called the Immokalee Archipelago. The large Hendry Platform lay behind the reef on the east. Mangrove forests extended southwesterly of the pseudo-atoll along what would be the southwestern Florida coast. To the northwest was the Myakka Lagoon System, a tropical estuary of brackish water.

On the east the lay the Miami-Palm Beach Reef Tract with narrow back reef. Between the west and east was the wide and very deep 100-meter (330 ft) lagoon known as the Loxahatchee Trough. The northern part of the pseudo-atoll was the Kissimmee Embayment which was lined with mud flats and jungles of mangrove.

== Chronology ==
The pseudo-atoll's chronology is developed from deposition of a variety of community organisms. The oldest are the early Piacenzian communities of shallow intertidal muddy-sand Mercenaria tridacnoides community of clam species, the deep lagoon Nodipecten peedeensis community of scallops, the shallow lagoon Apicula buckinghamensis community of tower shell snails, and lagoon coral Phyllangia blakei community.

The second time period is mid-Piacenzian and contains the shallow muddy intertidal Strombus floridanus (conch) communities, shallow lagoon tower shell snail Apicula gladeensis community, lagoon scallop Nodipecten floridensis community, and the shallow lagoon Hyotissa meridionalis community of foam oysters.

The third time period is the late Piacenzian and contained wave-action related coral zones of open ocean to sheltered basin. The communities are the high energy open ocean Pocillopora crassoramosa community of the coral reef crest. The back reef Dichocoenia tuberosa community of coral, the low energy back reef Isophyllia desotonsis community of coral, the sheltered back reef Stylophora affinis community, and sheltered reef lagoon Antillia bilobata community of coral.

The fourth was during the maximum development of the Myakka Lagoon System estuary and included the mudflat mangrove forests of the Pyrazisinus scalinus community, and the shallow and muddy lagoon clam beds of the Mulinia sapotilla community. Later the shallow lagoon mussel shoals of the Perna conradiana community and shallow lagoon Chama emmonsii community. The Kissimmee Embayment contained the shallow mangrove forests and mudflat Pyrazisinus kissimmeesis community of sea snails and sand flats and turtle grass of the Siphocypraea kissimmeesis community.
