= Okeechobee =

Okeechobee may refer to:

- Lake Okeechobee, in Florida, United States
- Okeechobee, Florida, United States
- Okeechobee County, Florida, United States
- Okeechobee Waterway, in Florida, United States
- Okeechobee Plain, in Florida, United States
- Okeechobee Group, geologic group in Florida, United States
- Okeechobee (Metrorail station)
- Okeechobee (Amtrak station)
- 1928 Okeechobee hurricane
- Okeechobee Music & Arts Festival, in Florida, United States
