= Amelia E. Shevenell =

American marine geologist

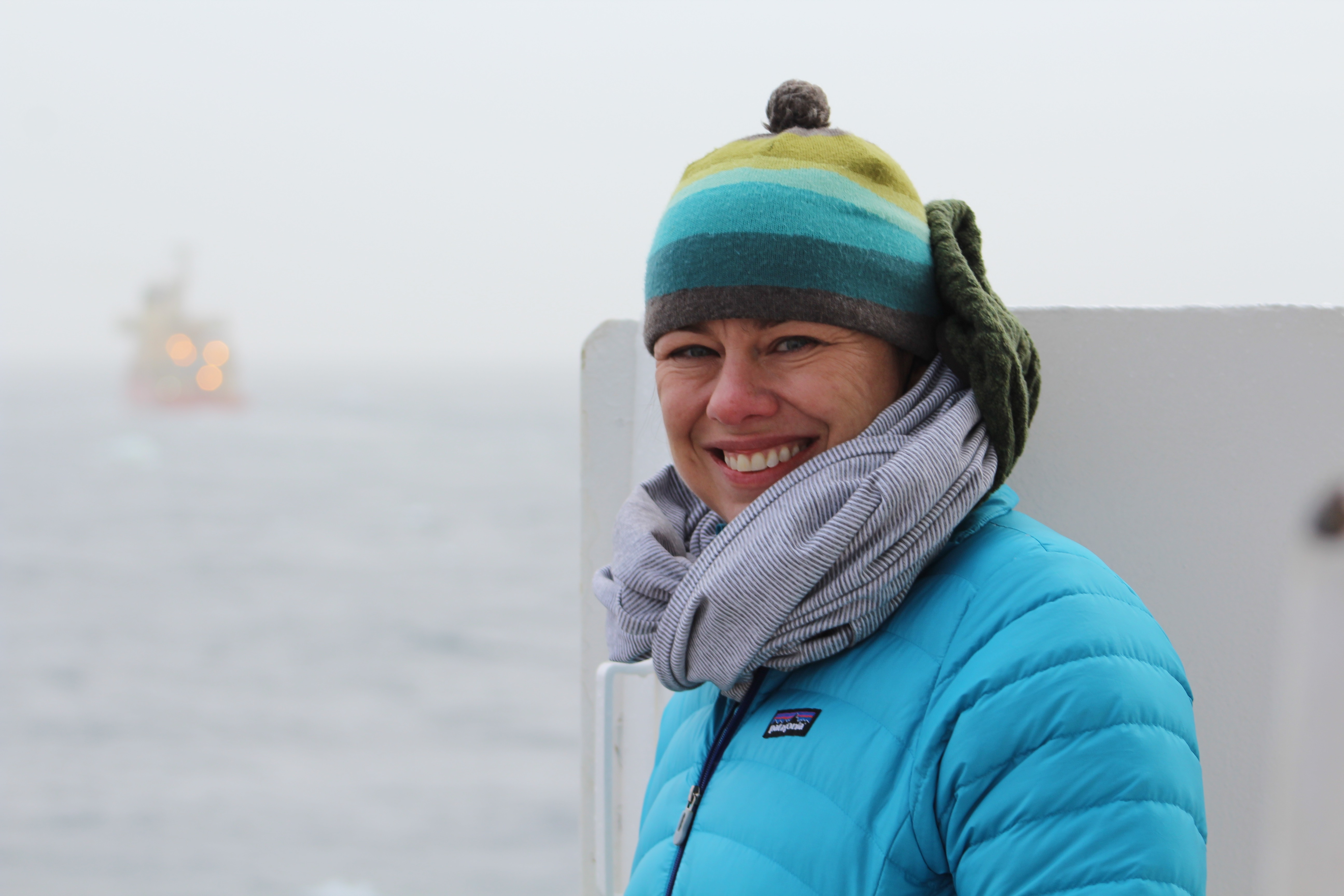
- Shevenell on drill ship in the Southern Ocean
- Education: Hamilton College; University of California, Santa Barbara
- Scientific career
- Workplaces: University of Washington University College London University of South Florida
- Doctoral advisor: James P. Kennett
- Website: https://ameliashevenell.wordpress.com/

Amelia E. Shevenell is an American marine geologist who specializes in high-latitude paleoclimatology and paleoceanography. She is currently a Professor in the College of Marine Science at the University of South Florida. She has made notable contributions to understanding the history of the Antarctic ice sheets and published in high-impact journals and, as a result, was awarded full membership of Sigma Xi. She has a long record of participation in international ocean drilling programs and has served in leadership positions of these organizations. Shevenell served as the elected Geological Oceanography Council Member for The Oceanography Society (2019-2021).

== Early life and education ==
Shevenell earned a bachelor's degree in geology and studio art at Hamilton College in New York State. Shevenell worked as a laboratory technician and environmental scientist in Juneau, Alaska, before attending the University of California, Santa Barbara, where she studied Antarctic ice sheet evolution and paleoceanography and earned her Ph.D. in Marine Science (2004). Shevenell was a postdoctoral fellow at the Program on Climate Change at the University of Washington School of Oceanography. From 2007 to 2011, Shevenell was a lecturer in earth sciences and geography at University College London. In 2011, Shevenell joined the faculty of the University of South Florida College of Marine Science, earning tenure in 2017.

== Career and impact ==
Amelia Shevenell's research focuses on understanding the evolution of Antarctica's ice sheets over the last 65 million years. Shevenell uses the sedimentological, geochemical, and micropaleontological properties of marine sediments from the deep-sea and Antarctica's continental margins to reconstruct relationships between Antarctica's ice sheets and Earth's oceans, carbon cycle, and climate on million - to decadal timescales. Shevenell's research is relevant to Intergovernmental Panel on Climate Change (IPCC) concerns that ongoing oceanic and atmospheric warming is accelerating polar ice cap melting and global sea level rise. She has participated in eight oceanographic expeditions to the Southern Ocean, several of which are featured in her scientific blogs.

Antarctic ice sheet development during the Cenozoic. Shevenell's research has focused on Antarctic ice sheet development in the Miocene when ice expansion occurred. Her work discovered that Southern Ocean cooling during the Middle Miocene Climate Transition occurred before the expansion of Antarctica's ice sheets at ~14 million years ago. Shevenell has since shown that progressive ice sheet expansion on Antarctica began around 14.8 million years ago, during the Miocene Climatic Optimum, when average global temperatures were warmer than present. Ice growth was paced by changes the eccentricity of Earth's orbit around the Sun. Another study established that glaciers reached the Sabrina Coast of East Antarctica by at least the late Paleocene to early Eocene. This finding was counter to earlier studies that placed the beginning of ice expansion in Antarctica at the start of the Oligocene roughly 34 million years ago.

Carbon cycling in high-latitude oceans. In a study of Holocene marine sediments in the western Pacific Shevenell found evidence for increased upwelling in the North Pacific. The increased upwelling was caused by stronger winds, which in turn released more CO_{2} into the atmosphere enhancing global warming during the Holocene and the shrinkage of ice sheets. Thus, demonstrating that a possible cause of the warming was a change in ocean circulation.

Holocene ocean temperature and climate evolution of the western Antarctic Peninsula. TEX_{86} proxy analysis of sediments from the western Antarctic Peninsula continental shelf documented the changing influence of warm Circumpolar Deep Water on regional glacier and sea ice extent since the last deglaciation, ~13,000 years ago. Cooling rather than warming occurred, driven by changes in local solar irradiance associated with changes in Earth's orbit. At present, atmospheric connections to the tropical Pacific allow warm ocean waters to move onto Antarctica's continental shelves, melting regional glaciers. Shevenell's research indicates this process has occurred in past warm climate intervals, and will likely continue as Earth's climate continues to warm.

Participation in scientific ocean drilling. Shevenell is involved in scientific ocean drilling and has worked both as an onshore laboratory scientist and twice as a shipboard scientist on seven Ocean Drilling Program/International Ocean Discovery Program (ODP/IODP) expeditions. She participated as a sedimentologist on ODP Leg 189 to the South Tasman Rise. This expedition tested the hypothesis that Antarctic Ice Sheets developed in association with the development of the Southern Ocean and the Antarctic Circumpolar Current. Shevenell led the sedimentology group on IODP Expedition 374 to the central Ross Sea, Antarctica. This Expedition was designed to understand the factors influencing ice sheet development over the last 20 million years, including the formation and history of the West Antarctic Ice Sheet.

Shevenell has also served within the leadership of the IODP Scientific Advisory Structure, as a member of the Science Evaluation Panel (2011-2014) and the United States Advisory Committee for Scientific Ocean Drilling (2014-2018). Shevenell has served as a US member of the JOIDES Resolution facility board since 2019.

== Honors and recognition ==
In 2006, Shevenell was awarded the Storrs Cole Memorial Research Award of the Geological Society of America for her publications on invertebrate micropaleontology.

Based upon her scientific ocean drilling research, Shevenell was selected as an IODP Distinguished Lecturer for 2014–2015. Lecturers are nominated by the scientific ocean drilling community and selected by the United States Science Support Office for ocean drilling. Distinguished lecturers visit institutions that are not typically involved in ocean drilling and may not have funds to host visiting speakers.

In 2016, Shevenell was recognized by American Geophysical Union (AGU) journal editors as an AGU Outstanding Reviewer for Geophysical Research Letters.

In 2019, Shevenell was elected as a Full Member of Sigma Xi, the scientific research honor society.

Her Nature paper, Gulick and Shevenell et al. was featured as a cover image by the journal and highlighted in its News and Views section.

== Media coverage ==
The significance of Shevenall's work to the understanding of changes affecting the Antarctic ice sheets have been featured in Discover Magazine, National Geographic, and Reuters.

Her research is featured in an episode of the Forecast Podcast a podcast about climate science and climate scientists with Nature’s editor for climate science, Michael White.

Shevenell also maintains a blog for Antarctic research cruises on ice breaker Laurence Gould LMG12-11 (October, 2012); LMG13-11 (October 2013); icebreaker Nathaniel Palmer NBP14-02 (January–March, 2014), and IODP Expedition 374 (January–March, 2018).

== Selected works ==
- Smith, Catherine; Warny, Sophie; Shevenell, Amelia E.; Gulick, Sean P.S.; Leventer, Amy (2018-12-12). "New species from the Sabrina Flora: an early Paleogene pollen and spore assemblage from the Sabrina Coast, East Antarctica". Palynology. 43 (4): 650–659. Bibcode:2019Paly...43..650S. doi:10.1080/01916122.2018.1471422. ISSN 0191-6122. S2CID 134670668.
- Drury, Anna Joy; John, Cédric M.; Shevenell, Amelia E. (2016). "Evaluating climatic response to external radiative forcing during the late Miocene to early Pliocene: New perspectives from eastern equatorial Pacific (IODP U1338) and North Atlantic (ODP 982) locations". Paleoceanography. 31 (1): 167–184. Bibcode:2016PalOc..31..167D. doi:10.1002/2015PA002881. hdl:10044/1/30691. ISSN 1944-9186.
- Jiang, Hanchao; Shevenell, Amelia; Yu, Song; Xu, Hongyan; Mao, Xue (2015-10-01). "Decadal- to centennial-scale East Asian summer monsoon variability during the Medieval Climate Anomaly reconstructed from an eastern Tibet lacustrine sequence". Journal of Paleolimnology. 54 (2): 205–222. Bibcode:2015JPall..54..205J. doi:10.1007/s10933-015-9847-1. ISSN 1573-0417. S2CID 127658939.
- Shevenell, Amelia; Bohaty, Steven (2012-09-01). "Southern Exposure: New Paleoclimate Insights From Southern Ocean and Antarctic Margin Sediments". Oceanography. 25 (3): 106–117. doi:10.5670/oceanog.2012.82. ISSN 1042-8275.
- Tian, Jun; Shevenell, Amelia; Wang, Pinxian; Zhao, Quanhong; Li, Qianyu; Cheng, Xinrong (2009-12-30). "Reorganization of Pacific Deep Waters linked to middle Miocene Antarctic cryosphere expansion: A perspective from the South China Sea". Palaeogeography, Palaeoclimatology, Palaeoecology. 284 (3): 375–382. Bibcode:2009PPP...284..375T. doi:10.1016/j.palaeo.2009.10.019. ISSN 0031-0182.
- Shevenell, Amelia E.; Kennett, James P.; Lea, David W. (2008). "Middle Miocene ice sheet dynamics, deep-sea temperatures, and carbon cycling: A Southern Ocean perspective". Geochemistry, Geophysics, Geosystems. 9 (2): n/a. Bibcode:2008GGG.....9.2006S. doi:10.1029/2007GC001736. ISSN 1525-2027. S2CID 128508240.
- Shevenell, Amelia E.; Kennett, James P. (2007-10-01). "Cenozoic Antarctic cryosphere evolution: Tales from deep-sea sedimentary records". Deep Sea Research Part II: Topical Studies in Oceanography. Paleoceanography and Paleoclimatology of the Southern Ocean. 54 (21): 2308–2324. Bibcode:2007DSRII..54.2308S. doi:10.1016/j.dsr2.2007.07.018. ISSN 0967-0645.
- Shevenell, A. E.; Kennett, J. P. (2013), "Paleoceanographic Change During the Middle Miocene Climate Revolution: An Antarctic Stable Isotope Perspective", The Cenozoic Southern Ocean: Tectonics, Sedimentation, and Climate Change Between Australia and Antarctica, American Geophysical Union (AGU), pp. 235–251, doi:10.1029/151gm14, ISBN 9781118666210
- Shevenell, Amelia E.; Kennett, James P. (2002). "Antarctic Holocene climate change: A benthic foraminiferal stable isotope record from Palmer Deep". Paleoceanography. 17 (2): PAL 9–1–PAL 9–12. Bibcode:2002PalOc..17.8000S. doi:10.1029/2000PA000596. ISSN 1944-9186.
- Shevenell, A.E.; Domack, E.W.; Kernan, G.M. (1996). "Record of Holocene palaeoclimate change along the Antarctic Peninsula: evidence from glacial marine sediments, Lallemand Fjord". Papers and Proceedings of the Royal Society of Tasmania. 130 (2): 55–64. doi:10.26749/rstpp.130.2.55.

== See also ==
- Calcium carbonate compensation depth
