= Pseudo-atoll =

Island that encircles a lagoon

A pseudo-atoll, like an atoll, is an island that encircles a lagoon, either partially or completely. A pseudo-atoll differs from an atoll as established by several authorities, such as how it is formed (not by subsidence, nor by coral). It is considered a preferable term to "near-atoll". There is a need for rigorous definition of "pseudo-atoll" before it can be accepted as a general term.

== Definitions ==
Alexander Agassiz used the term pseudo-atoll for "any ring-shaped reefs not formed as a result of subsidence". while Norman D. Newell and J. Keith Rigby called such reefs non-coral. and "We conclude that almost-atoll should be retained as a descriptive term as defined by Davis and Tayama, and that the use of "near-atoll" as a synonym be abandoned. The value of terms such as "semi-atoll" and "pseudo-atoll" needs close examination and more rigorous definition before being generally accepted." H. Mergner yet states that micro-atolls classify as pseudo-atolls. Professor David R. Stoddart of Berkeley states an "almost-atoll" is an atoll with a central island of left over residue.

== Usage ==
Dr. Edward J. Petuch, author of Cenozoic seas: the view from eastern North America, refers to pseudo-atolls as pseudoatolls with the Everglades Pseudoatoll as an example.

== See also ==
- Coral reef
- Depression (geology)
