= Reef Hobbyist Magazine =

US magazine focused on reef life

Reef Hobbyist Magazine, founded in 2007 in California, is a reef-focused magazine that teaches hobbyists of all levels how to succeed at reef-keeping. The magazine is published in print in the U.S. and is also available online for free to hobbyists through its website. There was also a Chinese version published for readers in Asia, but it is no longer being published. Having an emphasis on responsible reef-keeping, many of the articles offer information on captive breeding and propagation of reef fish and corals. The hard copy magazine comes out quarterly and can be found in local fish stores across the U.S. By 2019, one of the founders of Reef Hobbyist Magazine co-founded Aquarium Hobbyist Magazine, a freshwater-focused magazine addressing all types of freshwater aquariums.
