= Kissimmee/Okeechobee Lowland =

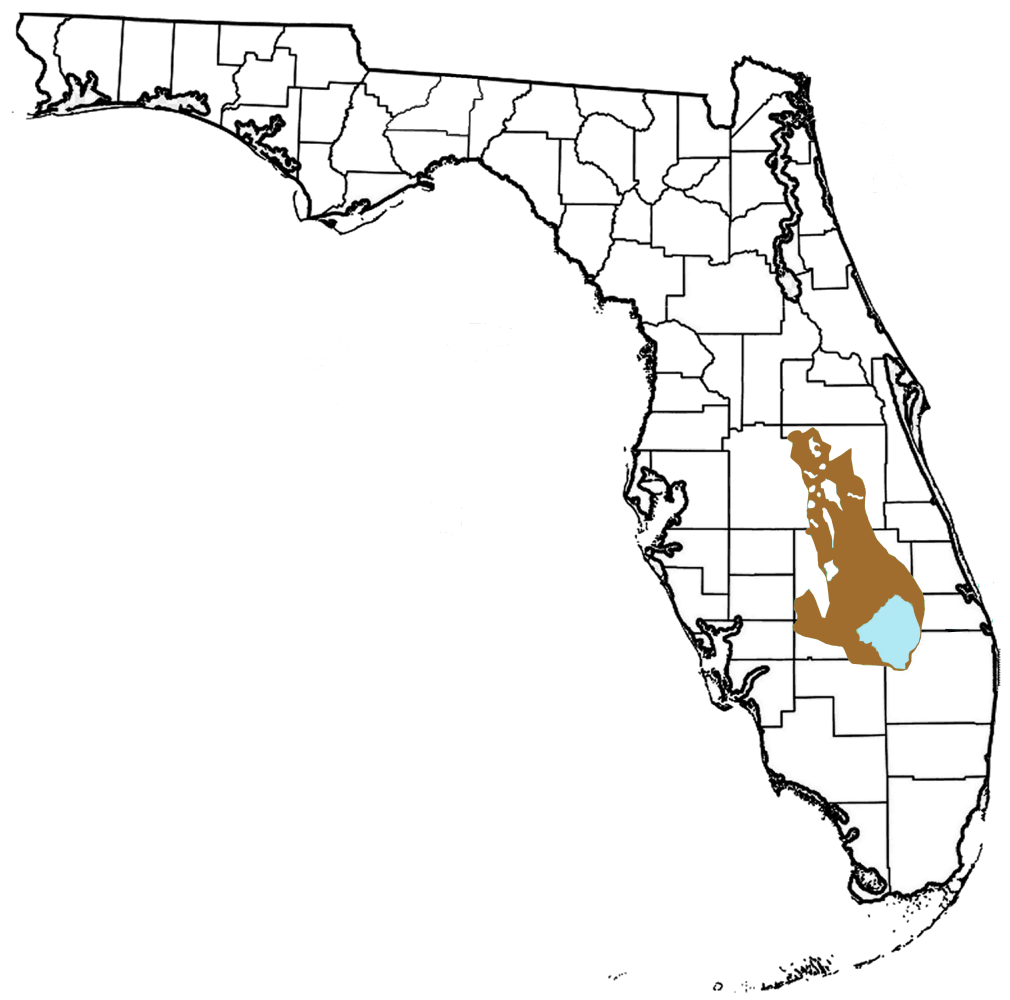
Depiction of the Kissimmee/Okeechobee Lowland (in brown).

The Kissimmee/Okeechobee Lowland is one of 47 distinct lake regions within the state of Florida, United States.

== Location ==
The Kissimmee/Okeechobee is located in the central part of the state bounding Lake Okeechobee to the south and extending north to the Osceola Slope in Osceola County. It is bounded on the west by the Lake Wales Ridge and on the east by the Eastern Flatlands.

Counties within its borders are Osceola, Highlands, Polk, Okeechobee, and Glades.

== Origin ==
The Kissimmee/Okeechobee Lowland's name was established by Florida Department of Environmental Protection's Lake Bioassessment/Regionalization Initiative. Delineations are determined by soils, physiography, geology, hydrology, vegetation, climate, and land use. It has the United States Environmental Protection Agency ecoregion designation of 75–35.

Its physical origin is Pleistocene though it sits atop earlier deposits of sediments. Its southern end is the ancient Kissimmee Embayment of the Pliocene. It's interglacial periods show mostly Florida's Penholoway terrace and shoreline at an elevation of 70 to 22 feet above sea level with smaller areas of Wicomico (100–70 feet) and Talbot (42–25 feet).

== Geography ==
Composed of most of the Kissimmee Valley, this lowland is dry prairie used for pasture and seasonal wet prairie. It contains grassland, flatwoods, and low-lying swamp forests. Its southernmost part also contains Okeechobee Plain.

== Geology ==
The soils are Pleistocene lagoonal deposits of coastal sand and shelly silty sand. The lakes are alkaline, eutrophic, with color.
