= DeSoto Plain =

Geologic feature of Florida, U.S.

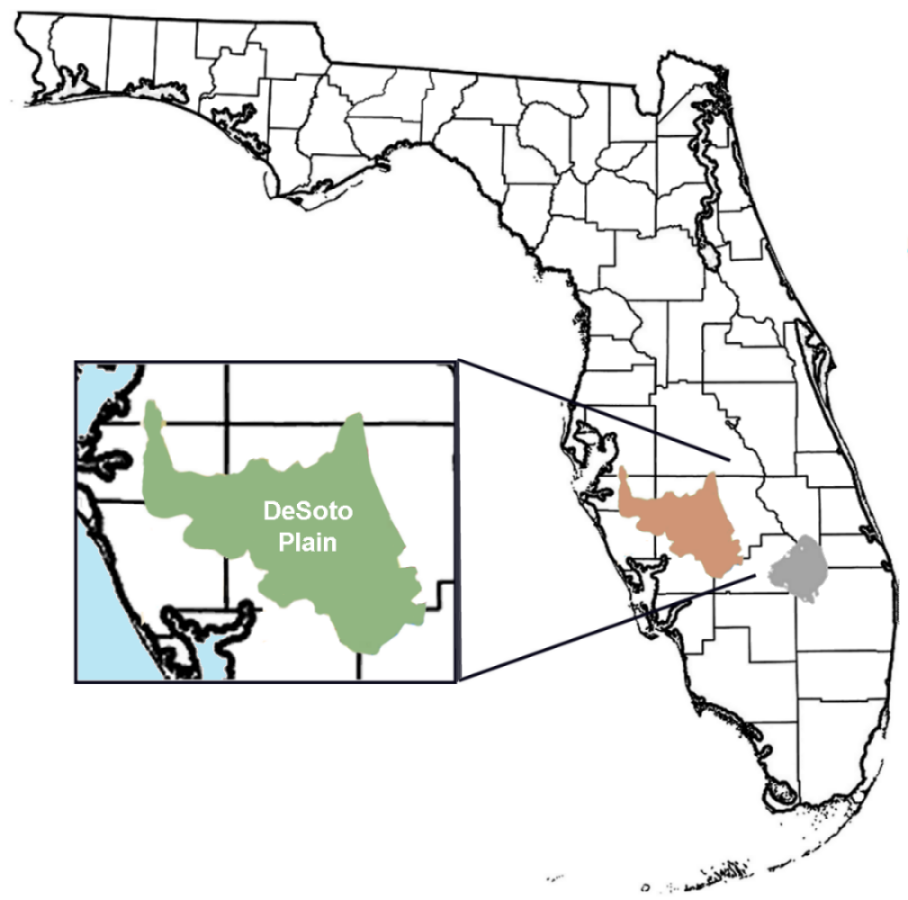
Depiction of the DeSoto Plain.

The DeSoto Plain is a major geologic feature of Florida formed during the Miocene epoch and named for DeSoto County, Florida, United States.

The DeSoto is an old prairie or grassland at elevations of 70 to 100 feet bounded by the lower elevation Okeechobee Plain on the east. It covers the counties of DeSoto, Manatee, Hardee, Highlands Glades, and Charlotte.

The DeSoto plain was the ancient feature of Florida as the peninsula formed over time. Edward Petuch writes that the DeSoto plain had rivers which poured sediments into the Polk Subsea during the Miocene's Serravallian and early Langhian stages filling the Okeechobean Basin to the south. A large complex river delta was formed between the time of the Polk Subsea and the creation of the Charlotte Subsea called the DeSoto Delta. This delta continued to carry sediments from a paleovalley on the DeSoto Plain and Lake Wales Ridge system region to the basin's western side. (Petuch, p. 50)

== See also ==
- Okeechobean Sea
