= Okeechobee Plain =

Geologic feature of Florida

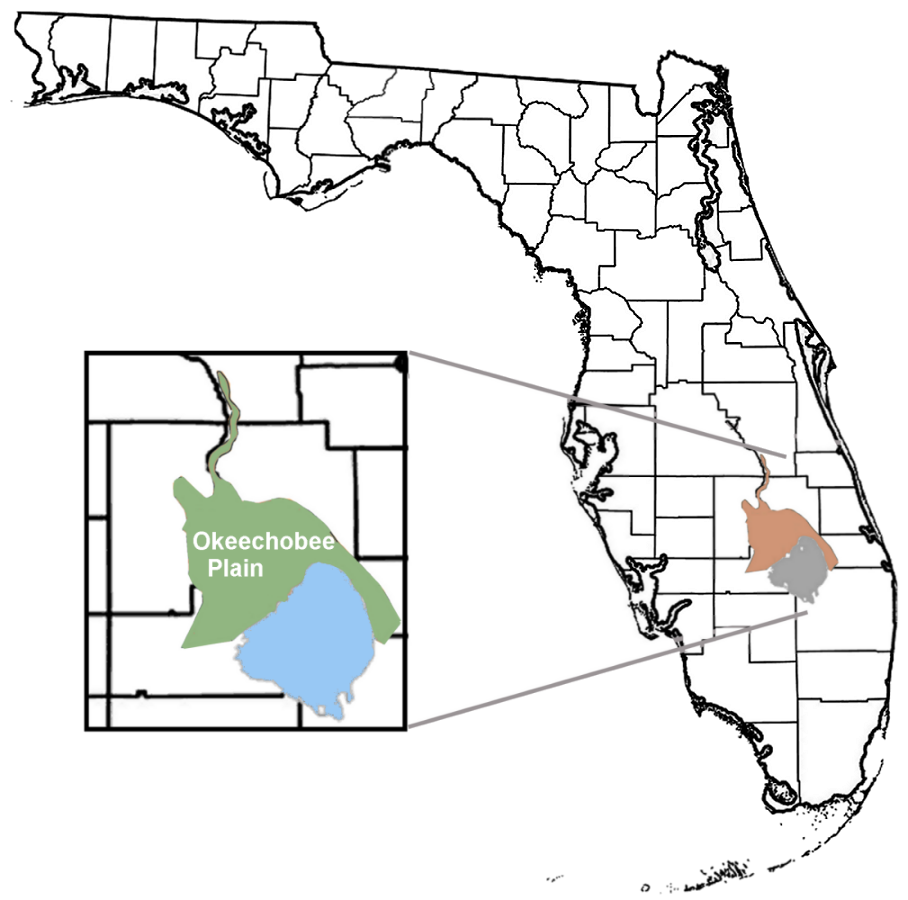
Depiction of location of Okeechobee Plain according to the FL EPA

The Okeechobee Plain is a major geologic feature of Florida formed during the Pliocene and Pleistocene epochs and named for Okeechobee County, Florida, United States.

== Description ==
The Okeechobee Plain is a dry prairie or grassland located directly north of Lake Okeechobee and is present in the counties of Highlands (eastern), Glades (northeastern), Indian River (western) and Okeechobee where it is present along the western bank of the Kissimmee River.

The Okeechobee Plain is within the Kissimmee/Okeechobee Lowland established by the Florida Department of Environmental Protection's Lake Bioassessment/Regionalization Initiative.

== Origin ==
The Okeechobee Plain was created during the Pliocene and Pleistocene's wild climatic times through continuous depositing of sediments from rivers as the peninsula grew southward. During the Piacenzian (3.6—2.5 Ma) stage of the Pliocene the plain, was, for the most part, submerged and is referred to as part of the Kissimmee Embayment.

== Bounding geographic features ==
The two major geographic features bounding the Okeechobee Plain are the Osceola Plain to the north and Caloosahatchee Incline to the southwest.(Florida EPA Basin Status)

== See also ==
- DeSoto Plain
