= Gulf of Mexico basin =

Oceanic rift basin

USGS Geologic Map of the Gulf of Mexico

The formation of the Gulf of Mexico, an oceanic rift basin located between North America and the Yucatan Block, was preceded by the breakup of the Supercontinent Pangaea in the Late-Triassic, weakening the lithosphere. Rifting between the North and South American plates continued in the Early-Jurassic, approximately 160 million years ago, and formation of the Gulf of Mexico, including subsidence due to crustal thinning, was complete by 140 Ma. Stratigraphy of the basin, which can be split into several regions, includes sediments deposited from the Jurassic through the Holocene, currently totaling a thickness between 15 and 20 kilometers.

== Basin countries ==
1. Cuba
2. Mexico
  1. Campeche
  2. Quintana Roo
  3. Tabasco
  4. Tamaulipas
  5. Veracruz
  6. Yucatán
3. United States
  1. Alabama
  2. Florida
  3. Louisiana
  4. Mississippi
  5. Texas

== Tectonics ==
=== Pangaea ===
Beneath the sediments of the Gulf of Mexico basin, most of the pre-Triassic basement rocks are believed to be allochthonous thrust sheets sutured during the formation of Pangaea. However, it was during the break-up of the supercontinent that the foundation for the Gulf of Mexico sediments would be laid. Prior to the rifting which formed the Gulf of Mexico basin, extensional deformation in the Late-Triassic caused by the breakup up of Pangaea, and more specifically the rifting of the Atlantic Ocean, created basement graben formations which filled with terrestrial red bed sediments, and volcanic sediments from the eruption of the Central Atlantic Magmatic Plume. The plume erupted 60,000 cubic kilometers of flood basalts over ancestral North and South America, Africa and parts of Europe. In addition to the basalt flows, other important igneous rock types include diabases associated with the grabens and red beds, and overlapping, north-northwest trending dike swarms related to the tectonic volcanism of the breakup of Pangaea.

=== Early to mid-Jurassic ===
Separation of the North and South American Plates in the Early-Mid Jurassic beginning with the rotation of the Yucatan Block, along with changes in sea level and thermal activity from the active rift, created a shallow marine basin wherein thick Jurassic salts and evaporites could be deposited. These evaporites overlay a thick transitional crust, the local basement rock prior to rifting, and deposition of salts continued over the forming oceanic crust as rifting spread the sea floor throughout the Jurassic. It was during the Jurassic, approximately 140–160 million years ago, that the shape of the Gulf of Mexico as we know it was formed.

The unique shape of the Gulf of Mexico, surrounded on all sides by continental crust, is the result of two different tectonic boundaries: an ocean-continent transform boundary, and a magmatic plume fueled seafloor spreading center active contemporaneously in regards to geologic time. The transform boundary caused two approximately 22° counterclockwise rotations of the Yucatan Block away from the North American plate. One rotation happened prior to seafloor spreading, and the second rotation happened while the basin spread, creating the current geographical shape of the Gulf of Mexico and the current placement of the Yucatan Peninsula.

Simple animation depicting the opening of the Gulf of Mexico

The active rifting of the Late-Triassic to Mid-Jurassic, and the stratigraphy which depended strongly on that tectonic development, is followed by a relatively calm tectonic period in the Late-Jurassic. The Late-Jurassic Gulf of Mexico is characterized mostly by prolonged subsidence in the central region, as well as heavy sedimentation around the Florida Platform and Northern Gulf of Mexico.

=== Late Jurassic through the Cretaceous ===
While a few intrusive igneous formations found as far south as Mexico City are dated to the Late-Jurassic or Early Cretaceous, the Gulf of Mexico during that time was relatively devoid of igneous activity. It wasn't until the Late Mesozoic that low-volume yet widespread volcanism occurred along the Western and Northwestern margins of the Gulf of Mexico, leaving the Yucatan Peninsula with an extremely alkali volcanic field in the subsurface. The volcanism is believed to have been activated along ancient plate boundaries weakened by the loading of sediments in the Gulf.

=== Sedimentation and stratigraphy ===
==== Pre-rift ====
As mentioned above, the pre-rift stratigraphy of the central Gulf of Mexico basin, which now lies beneath nearly 20 kilometers of sediment deposited during the Jurassic through the Holocene, is made up primarily of extensional graben formations filled with "red beds," basalt flows, and diabase dikes and sills deposited and intruded during the break-up of Pangaea and the explosion of the Central Atlantic Magmatic Plume.

Red beds, also referred to as non-marine clastic sequences, which are often red in color, have been found in wells drilled in the Gulf of Mexico which penetrated the Late-Triassic and Early-Jurassic strata, filling the extensional graben features. The Gulf of Mexico basin red beds are specifically named the Eagle Mills formation, located directly beneath the salt, evaporate, and marine sediments deposited during the Jurassic, and often found with the diabase dikes and basalt flows mentioned above.

Basement rocks in the northeastern region of the Gulf of Mexico basin are fragments of the African Plate, which remained behind during the breakup of Pangaea and date back to the late Precambrian through the Cambrian. It is atop these Precambrian plate fragments that the main carbonate and evaporite sediments deposited after the opening of the Gulf of Mexico became the Florida Platform.

==== Early-mid Jurassic ====
Salt in the Gulf of Mexico can be divided into two main regions: the Northern Gulf of Mexico salt basin and the Campeche salt basin; interpreted to have formed simultaneously. Also referred to as the Louann and the Yucatan Salt basins. Salt deposition in the Gulf of Mexico is poorly dated; the Louann Salt has no index fossils and the age is based on the ages of formations below and above. Salt deposition began in the Jurassic after the first rotation of the Yucatan Block. The thick halite was later split into two main sections as the seafloor spread, with some continued salt deposition as the rifting continued. The age of the salts are supported by the stratigraphy in the northern Gulf of Mexico where the Eagle Mills red beds, as discussed above, contain dikes as young as 180 Ma, and the Smackover formation above the salts contain index ammonite fossils placing the salts at an age no younger than 156 Ma. Deformation of this nearly 4-kilometer halite formation would eventually be caused by differential pressure due to uneven and heavy sediment loading on top, by siliciclastic, eolian, playa and other sediments characteristic of arid terrestrial environments closer to shore, implying that at certain times during deposition, sediments accumulated almost up to sea level.

Simplified Stratigraphic Sequence of Northern Gulf of Mexico from the Late-Triassic through Early-Cretaceous

The salt structures, which include anticlines, pillows, plugs and walls, in addition to extensive sheets, were created long after deposition by the rapid overlying sedimentation. Nearer the depocenter, which for the Gulf of Mexico basin was towards the spreading center, terrestrial sediments grade into marine shales and limestones.

Post salt deposition, the strata recorded millions of years of marine flooding sediments, carbonates from coral reefs, thick sandstones, and eventual deltaic sediments, all of which helped shape the characteristic features within the Gulf. A large, marine shelf platform, the Florida Platform, and underwater marine canyons formed 150 million years after the opening of the gulf.

==== Post-rift ====
Post rift sediments are the results of several million-year stories involving various carbonate reef formations, and heavy erosion events which flooded the gulf with terrestrial clastic sediments from inland North America, essentially recording the tectonic history of the North American continent since the Cretaceous.

The first post-rift sediments deposited on the Florida Platform were also Mid-Jurassic evaporites, followed by deltaic and shallow-marine siliciclastics; eventually sediments grade into the Cretaceous carbonates, evaporites, and chalks.

More recently, the Laramide Orogeny and consequential uplift of the Rocky Mountains, which led to increased sediments flooding the gulf, is responsible for the rapid loading and burial of the Wilcox Formation (pg 43), which is one of the deepwater Gulf of Mexico formations currently being exploited for hydrocarbons. This rapid loading is also responsible for the first salt flows from beneath the basin-margin region towards the continental slope.
