= Geringian =

North American faunal stage

The Geringian North American Stage on the geologic timescale is the North American faunal stage according to the North American Land Mammal Ages chronology (NALMA), typically set from 30,800,000 to 26,300,000 years BP, a period of 4.5 million years. It is usually considered to fall within the Oligocene epoch. The Geringian is preceded by the Whitneyan and followed by the Monroecreekian NALMA stages.

The Geringian overlaps with the Rupelian and Chattian ages.
