= Middle Miocene disruption =

Mass extinction event

The Middle Miocene Climatic Transition (MMCT) was a relatively steady period of climatic cooling that occurred around the middle of the Miocene, roughly 14 million years ago (Ma), during the Langhian stage, and resulted in the growth of ice sheet volumes globally, and the reestablishment of the ice of the East Antarctic Ice Sheet (EAIS). The term Middle Miocene disruption, alternatively the Middle Miocene extinction or Middle Miocene extinction peak, refers to a wave of extinctions of terrestrial and aquatic life forms that occurred during this climatic interval. This period was preceded by the Middle Miocene Climatic Optimum (MMCO), a period of relative warmth from 18 to 14 Ma. Cooling that led to the Middle Miocene disruption is primarily attributed CO_{2} being pulled out of the Earth's atmosphere by organic material before becoming caught in different locations like the Monterey Formation. These may have been amplified by changes in oceanic and atmospheric circulation due to continental drift. Additionally, orbitally paced factors may also have played a role.

== Effects ==
One of the primary effects of the climatic cooling that took place during this time period was the growth of the EAIS, termed the East Antarctic Ice Sheet Expansion (EAIE). A thermal shift from wet to cold-based glaciers is recorded from the Transantarctic Mountains about 13.94 Ma, reflecting a mean annual temperature drop of 25–30 °C. Significant sections of ice on the Antarctic continent are believed to have started growth at the beginning of the Middle Miocene disruption and continued to expand until about 10 Ma. This growth has been attributed primarily to orbitally paced changes in oceanic and atmospheric currents, with possible amplification by a significant drop in atmospheric carbon dioxide (ppm): atmospheric CO_{2} fell temporarily from about 300 to 140 ppm as estimated by the relationship between atmospheric levels of CO_{2} and pH levels in the ocean determined by boron isotopic levels in calcium carbonate. One of the primary indicators for the significant global ice sheet growth is the higher concentration of ^{18}O found in benthic foraminifera from oceanic sediment cores during this time period. During periods of ice sheet growth, the lighter ^{16}O isotopes found in ocean water are drawn out as precipitation and consolidate in ice sheets while a higher concentration of ^{18}O is left behind for foraminifera to utilize. The >180° phase reversal in the 41,000-year obliquity cycle around 14.0 to 13.8 Ma has also been interpreted as a signal of the EAIE.

During the MMCT, the latitudinal precipitation gradient declined in Europe, though it increased during short term warming periods superimposed on the broader cooling trend, whereas the seasonality of mean temperature increased. The seasonality of precipitation appears to have broken down, however, with European precipitation patterns being irregular on a multiannual to decadal timescale. In Anatolia, arboreal and non-arboreal vegetation fluctuated in abundance, indicating an increase in complex, vegetationally heterogeneous habitats. Global cooling during the MMCT caused aridification in Southwestern Europe, North Africa and South Asia. In the Qaidam Basin, silicate weathering sharply decreased around 12.6 Ma, indicating a major aridification event. Savanna biomes spread across Central and East Asia in response to the increased aridity. In the Columbia River Basalt Group (CRBG), the cessation of kaolin-producing pedogenic processes occurred at the start of the MMCT and has been used as a proxy marker for the end of the MMCO. Southwestern Australia exhibited the most arid conditions it had witnessed over any interval of the Miocene, while northwestern Australia was also hyperarid.

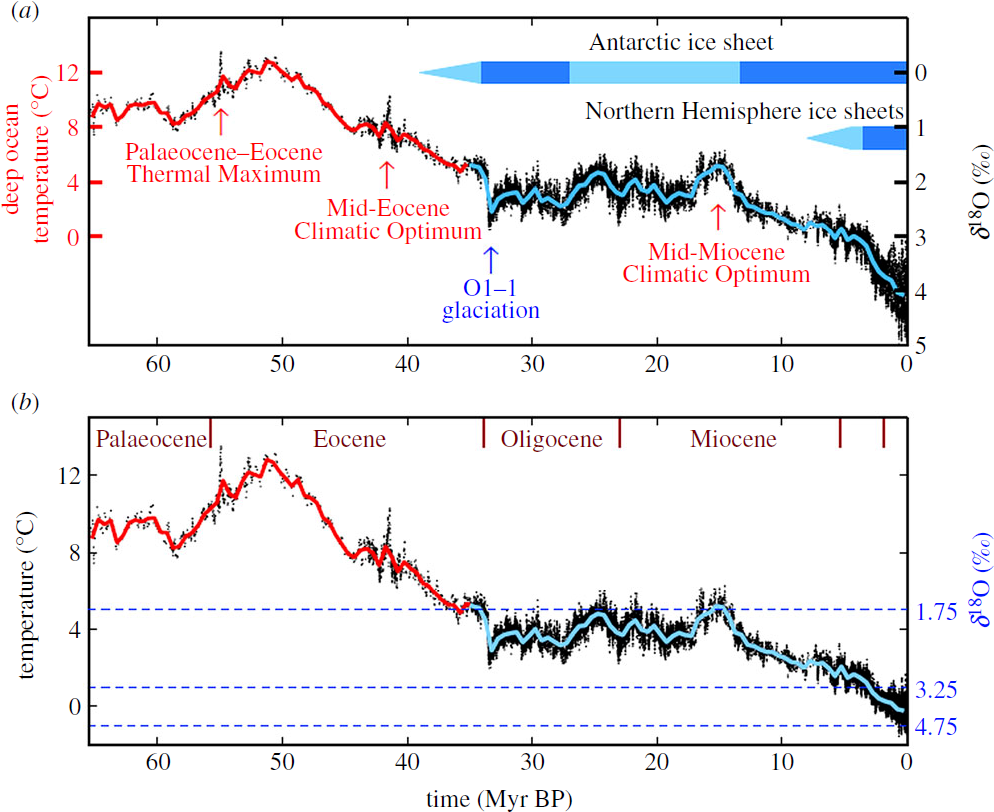
Significant drop-off in both temperature and deep-sea ocean temperature as measured by delta ^{18}O after the Middle Miocene Climatic Optimum

== Suggested causes ==
The primary cause of the cooling that came out of the MMCO was changing atmospheric CO_{2} levels. Falling CO_{2} concentrations in the atmosphere has been linked to drawdown of the gas into organic material deposited along continental margins like the Monterey Formation of coastal California, an explanation known as the Monterey Hypothesis. These sites of CO_{2} drawdown are thought to have been extensive enough to drop atmospheric concentrations in CO_{2} from about 300 to 140 ppm and lead to processes of global cooling that helped in the expansion of the EAIS.

Organic carbon burial on land, evidenced by widespread formation of lignite deposits at this time, also contributed heavily to the reduction in pCO_{2}.

Another hypothesis is that increased silicate weathering of the uplifting Himalayas caused the MMCT, but this is contradicted by geological evidence from the Indus River system.

As well significant changes in greenhouse gas concentrations, alterations to ocean circulation brought about major climatic and biotic changes. Oceanic circulation changes that took place during the MMCT are defined by increases in Antarctic Bottom Water (AABW) production, the halting of saline water delivery to the Southern Ocean from the Indian Ocean, and additional North Atlantic Deep Water production. The reduction in water transport from the warm Indian Ocean to the cool Southern Ocean is believed to be responsible for the increase in AABW production. The Tethys Seaway is believed to have closed around this time, exacerbating the disruptions of ocean circulation patterns that caused the MMCT. The northward movement of Australia hindered equatorial circulation between the Pacific and Indian Oceans, helping to cool tropical surface waters. The cooling of the Southern Ocean was coupled to the growth of the EAIS.

Another suggested cause is an encounter with a dense part of the gaseous component of the Radcliffe wave. It has been suggested that the Radcliffe wavefront crossing the Solar System coincides with the period of the Middle Miocene disruption.

An additional suggested cause for the Middle Miocene disruption has been attributed to a shift from a solar insolation cycle that is obliquity dominated to one that is dominated by eccentricity (see Milankovitch cycles). This change would have been significant enough for conditions near the Antarctic continent to allow for glaciation.

Vegetational changes are known to have exacerbated the cooling of the MMCT. The changes to the Earth's surface albedo caused by the southward retreat of needleleaf trees in the high latitudes of the Northern Hemisphere amplified the drop in temperatures.

== Extinction event ==
The Middle Miocene disruption is considered a significant extinction event and has been analyzed in terms of the importance of there being a possible periodicity between extinction events. A study from David Raup and Jack Sepkoski found that there is a statistically significant mean periodicity (where P is less than .01) of about 26 million years for 12 major extinction events. There is debate whether this potential periodicity is caused by some set of recurrent cycles or biologic factors.

A sharp drop in carbonate production, known as the Miocene Carbonate Crash (MCC), occurred during the early Tortonian, shortly after the cooling event; this event is generally regarded to have been induced by the changes in thermohaline circulation resulting from the Middle Miocene disruption. Changes in the intensity and seasonality of the Indian monsoon have been suggested to have brought about this change in ocean circulation. Another hypothesis for the crash involves the shrinkage and shoaling of the Central American Seaway, limiting water mass exchange between the Atlantic and Pacific Oceans. Evidence for this event is known from the Indian Ocean, Pacific Ocean, Atlantic Ocean, Caribbean Sea, and Mediterranean Sea, suggesting the decline of carbonate-producing marine organisms was a global phenomenon.

One of the other primary effects of the climatic cooling during the Middle Miocene was the biotic impact on terrestrial and oceanic lifeforms. A primary example of these extinctions is indicated by the observed occurrence of Varanidae, chameleons, Cordylidae, Tomistominae, Alligatoridae, and giant turtles through the Miocene Climatic Optimum (18 to 16 Ma) in Central Europe (45–42 °N palaeolatitude). This was then followed by a major and permanent cooling step marked by the Mid-Miocene disruption between 14.8 and 14.1 Ma. Two crocodilians of the genera Gavialosuchus and Diplocynodon were noted to have been extant in these northern latitudes prior to the permanent cooling step, but then became extinct between 14 and 13.5 Ma. Another indicator that would lead to extinctions is the conservative estimate that temperatures in the Antarctic region may have cooled by at least 8 °C in the summer months 14 Ma. This Antarctic cooling, along with significant changes in temperature gradients in Central Europe as indicated by Madelaine Böhme's study on ectothermic vertebrates, provide evidence that plant and animal life needed to migrate or adapt in order to survive. In South America, the MMCT is believed to have begun the decline of hathliacynids that led to their eventual extinction.
