= Gulf Trough =

Ancient geologic feature of Florida present during the Paleogene period

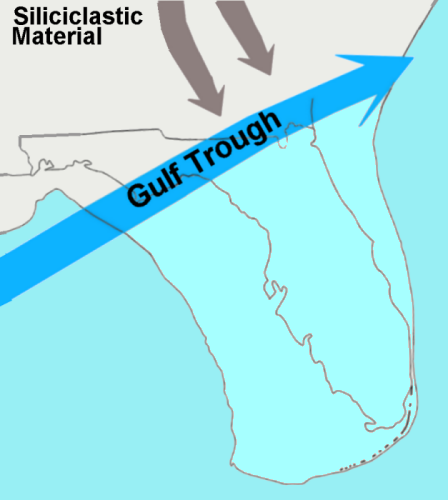
Depiction of the Gulf Trough over Florida.

The Gulf Trough, also known as the Suwanee Straits, is an ancient geologic feature of Florida present during the Paleogene period. A strong marine current, similar to the Gulf Stream, scoured the trough from southwest to northeast.

== History ==
During the Paleogene, what would become Florida was the submerged Florida Platform, a feature not unlike the Bahama Banks composed of carbonate sediments containing foraminifera, corals, bryozoa, and mollusks. Due to the current running through the Gulf Trough, materials needed for sedimentation were instead carried away toward the northeast.

During the Eocene through Oligocene, a period of roughly 32.8 million years, material born of erosion began building up more rapidly in the Gulf Trough, due to the uplifting of the Appalachian Mountains to the north, which provided the primary source of siliciclastic material transported south via streams. By the Early Miocene, considered the start of the Neogene, the trough was filled, and materials continued to move southward covering and replacing the carbonate-depositing marine environment with sands, silts, and clays; these sediments created the peninsula on which terrestrial flora and fauna could become established.
