= Temblor Formation =

Geologic formation in California

- Stratigraphic range: Late Oligocene-Mid Miocene; ~28–11.6 Ma
- Type: Geologic formation
- Sub-units: Agua Sandstone Member, Buttonbed Sandstone Member, Carneros Sandstone Member, Cymric Shale Member, Devilwater Siltstone, Gould Shale, Media Shale Member, Round Mountain Silt, Santos Shale Member, Wygal Sandstone Member
- Underlies: Monterey Formation

Lithology
- Primary: Shale, sandstone

Location
- Region: Western San Joaquin Valley, Kern County, California
- Country: United States

Type section
- Named for: Temblor Ranch, McKittrick district, Kern County
- Named by: Anderson
- Year defined: 1905

The Temblor Formation is a geologic formation in California. It preserves fossils dating back from the Late Oligocene to the Middle Miocene of the Neogene period. It is notable for the famous Sharktooth Hill deposit (otherwise known as Ernst Quarry).

== Fossils ==
=== Vertebrates ===
==== Cartilagenous fishes ====
===== Sharks =====
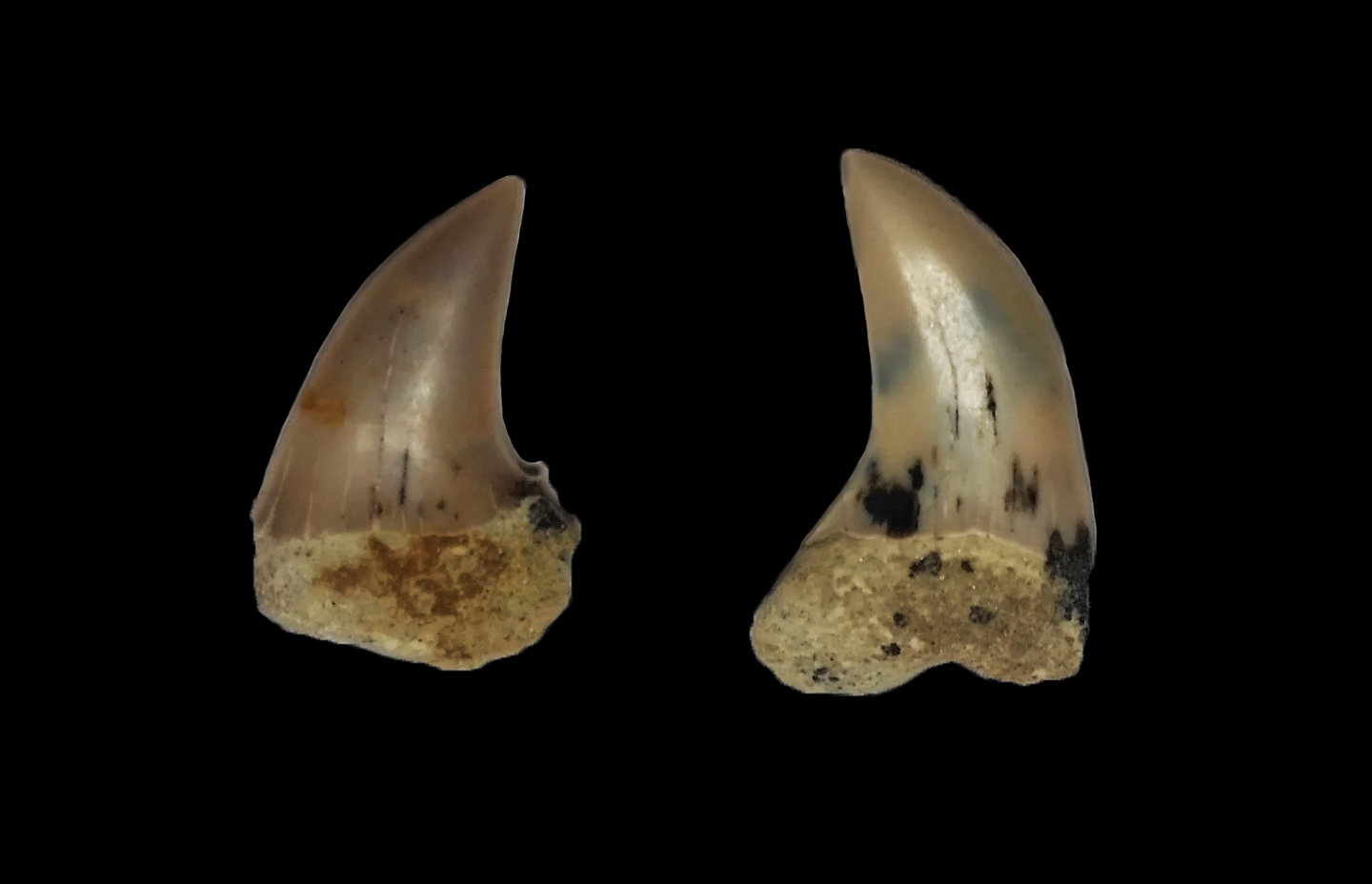
Isurus planus upper teeth from the Sharktooth Hill bonebed

- Carcharias
- Cephaloscyllium
- Cetorhinus
- †Carcharocles megalodon
- †Galeocerdo aduncus
- †Hemipristis serra
- Heterodontus
- Hexanchus
- †Isurus desori
- †Isurus hastalis
- †Isurus planus
- Megachasma
- Notorhynchus
- †Parotodus benedenii
- Scyliorhinus
- Squalus
- Squatina

===== Rays and skates =====
- Dasyatis
- Myliobatis

=== Reptiles ===
- Pacifichelys
- †Chelonia californiensis
- †Syllomus aegyptiacus

=== Birds ===
- †Diomedea californica
  - †D. milleri
- †Fulmarus miocaenus
- †Hadrogyps aigialerus
- †Megalodytes morejohni
- †Morus vagabundus
- †Osteodontornis orri
- †Pandion homalopteron
- †Presbychen abavus
- †Puffinus inceptor
  - †P. milleri
  - †P. priscus

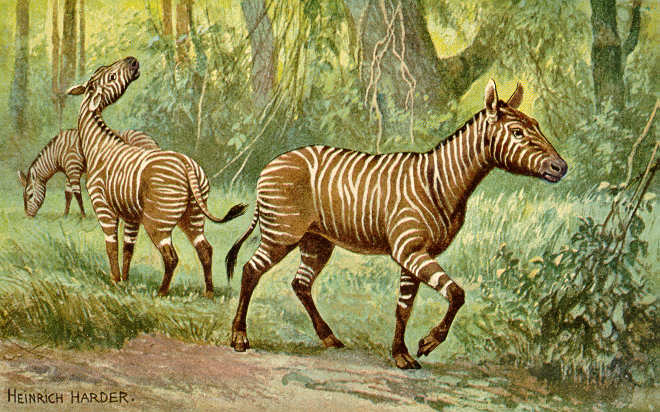
Artist's rendering of Hypohippus in its natural habitat

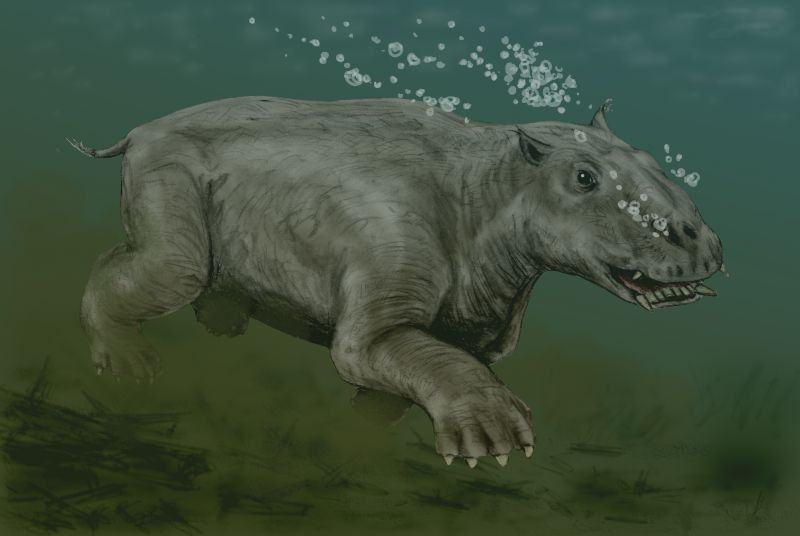
Restoration of Paleoparodoxia

=== Mammals ===
- †Allodesmus kernensis
- †Bouromeryx americanus
- †Hypohippus
- †Miotapirus
- †Paleoparadoxia tabatai
- †Paratomarctus temerarius
- †Pelagiarctos thomasi
- †Aulophyseter morricei
- †Oedolithax mira
- †Loxolithax sinuosa
- †Parietobalaena securis

=== Plants ===
- †Keteleeria heterophylloides
- †Glyptostrobus oregonensis
- †Pinus temblorensis
- †Zelkova oregoniana
- †Platanus dissecta
- †Persea pseudocarolinensis
- †Cornus ovaliss

== See also ==
- Geology of Kern County, California
- List of fossiliferous stratigraphic units in California
- Paleontology in California
