= Mako shark (disambiguation) =

Mako shark may refer to:

- Shortfin mako shark - a common species of the genus Isurus
- Longfin mako shark - a rarer species of the genus Isurus
- Corvette Mako Shark (concept car), a concept car made by Chevrolet
