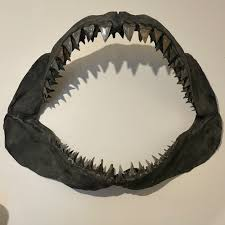
- Jaws reconstruction of C. plicatilis.

Scientific classification
- Kingdom: Animalia
- Phylum: Chordata
- Class: Chondrichthyes
- Subclass: Elasmobranchii
- Division: Selachii
- Order: Lamniformes
- Family: Lamnidae
- Genus: Carcharodon
- Species: †C. plicatilis

Binomial name
- †Carcharodon plicatilis (Agassiz, 1843)

Synonyms
- Isurus plicatilis Agassiz, 1843 (preocuped); Cosmopolitodus xiphodon? (Glickman, 1964); Isurus xiphodon (Agassiz, 1838); Cosmopolitodus plicatilis? Glickman, 1964 (nomen conservadum); Oxyrhina xiphodon (Agassiz, 1838); Cosmopolitodus cf. hastalis (Glickman, 1964); Carcharodon xiphodon Agassiz, 1843 (nomen nudum); Lamna xiphodon (Agassiz, 1838)

= Carcharodon plicatilis =

Carcharodon plicatilis Temporal range: Late Miocene-Early Pliocene, 7.1–3.6 Ma

Extinct species of shark

Carcharodon plicatilis (meaning "Bended japped/shaped-tooth" in Ancient Greek), also known as giant white shark, or broad-toothed mako, is an extinct species of giant lamnid shark that lived between the Late Miocene and Early Pliocene epochs, probably between 7.1 and 3.6 million years ago. It is also considered one of, if not, the largest species of shark of the family Lamnidae, and is considered a related species to the modern great white shark (Carcharodon carcharias), and possibly a direct ancestor to it, or a transitional species between C. hubbelli and C. hastalis.

The largest individual possibly reached up to 6–7.6 meters (20–25 ft) long. The validity of this species is in dispute, often considered as a junior synonym of C. hastalis, but some studies have suggested that C. plicatilis is a valid species and very closely related to the former. C. plicatilis is also known as Isurus xiphodon, depending on the classification.

== Taxonomy ==
=== History ===
The classification of C. plicatilis is in debate. It was originally named by Louis Agassiz as species of the genus Oxyrhina , as "Oxyrhina xiphodon" or "Oxyrhina plicatilis". Glickman (1964) reclassified this species in a separate genus, Cosmopolitodus. He named the type species C. hastalis, and three other species, C. plicatilis, C. xiphodon, and C. trigonodon. In 2017 the names C. plicatilis and C. xiphodon were recombined by Alberto Collareta as junior synonyms of Carcharodon plicatilis. The name C. trigonodon is considered a junior synonym of C. hastalis, in part.

Today, the C. plicatilis is placed in the genus Carcharodon , and a possible synonym of C. hastalis or a nomen dubium. But some studies of 2021 and 2023 challenged this view, suggesting that C. plicatilis is a valid species, closely related to C. hastalis, C. hubbelli, and the modern great white shark (Carcharodon carcharias).

== Description ==
=== Size ===
C. plicatilis is a large species of Carcharodon, with an estimated maximum body length of 6–7.6 meters (20–25 ft).

=== Teeth ===
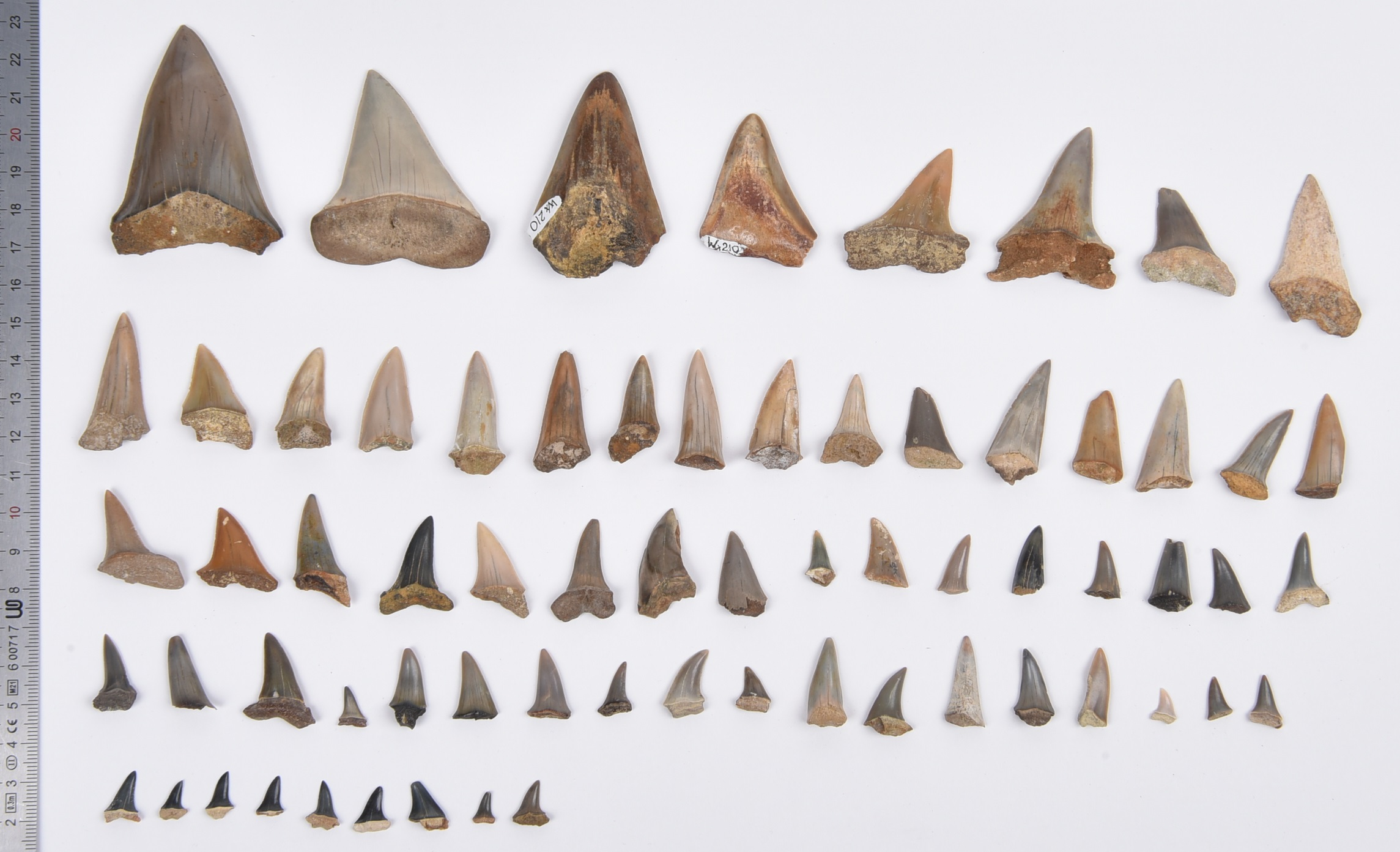
C. plicatilis and C. hastalis teeth.

The teeth of C. plicatilis are more robust than C. hastalis, and the shape of the teeth varies greatly from individual to individual. The largest tooth reached 10.3 centimeters (4.1 in) and, Its teeth are quite similar to those of C. hastalis, which is why it is some palaeontologists suspect that it is not a distinct species, but rather a synonym or individual variation.

== Distribution ==
Fossils of C. plicatilis have been found in deposits dated to the Miocene and Pliocene of North America, Europe, Australia, as well as possibly Asia, the Pacific Ocean, Portugal and South America. Fossils of C. plicatilis are very rare and that is why it is difficult to distinguish it from other species, as well as to synonymize it, especially with C. hastalis.

== Paleobiology ==
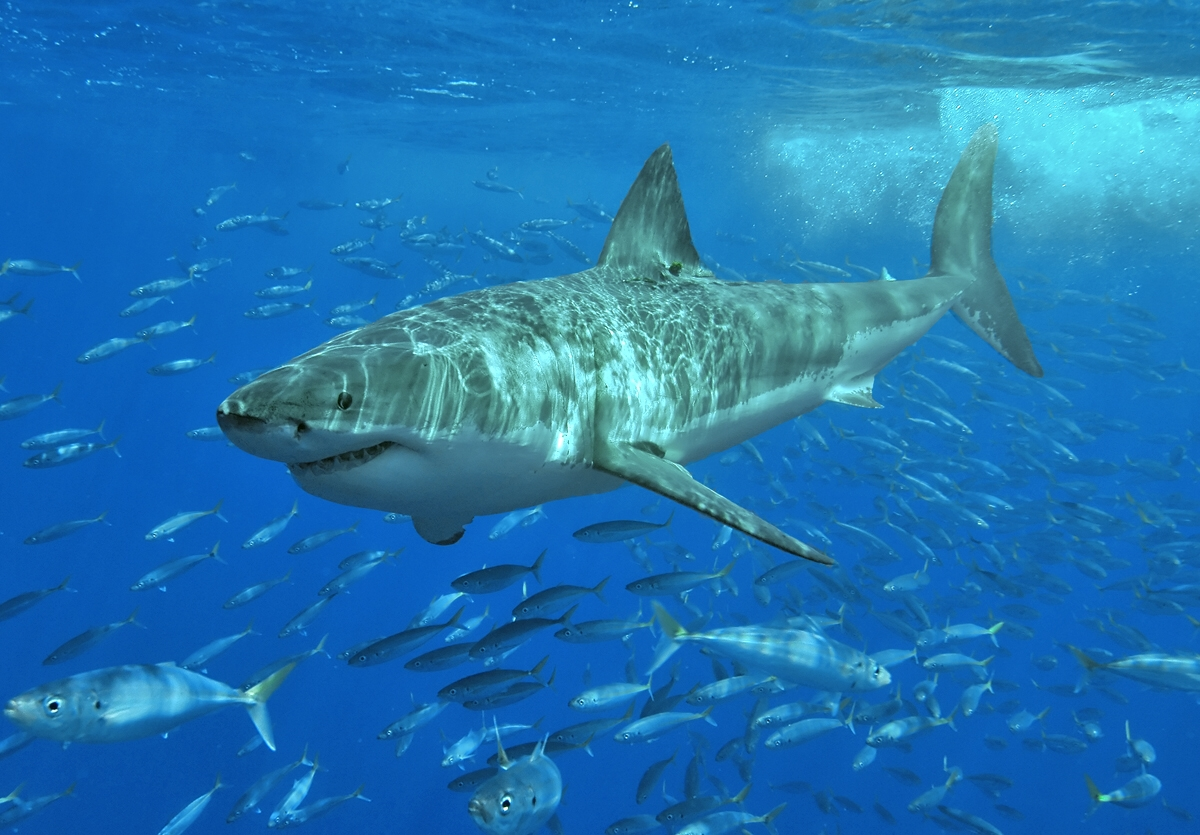
C. plicatilis occupied a niche similar to the modern-day (Carcharodon carcharias)

The largest Lamnidae C. plicatilis was one of the top predators in the Miocene to Pliocene ecosystems. According to various fossil evidence, it had a macroraptorial diet, preying on medium-sized fish, dolphins, pinnipeds, and baleen whales 4–6 meters (13–20 ft) long. It targeted prey similar to C. hastalis and the extant C. carcharias, but was able to target larger prey.

=== Hunting ===
According to the fossil record, C. plicatilis preyed on large marine mammals, such as small fin whales and beluga whales related species, during the Miocene. Tooth marks remaining on the skull indicate that C. plicatilis bit into the dolphin's head and crushed it instantly. This suggests that the genus Carcharodon possessed the ability to hunt marine mammals despite the absence of teeth side saw blade. C. plicatilis found in is primarily found in the same areas as pinnipeds. This suggests that C. plicatilis preferred pinnipeds.
