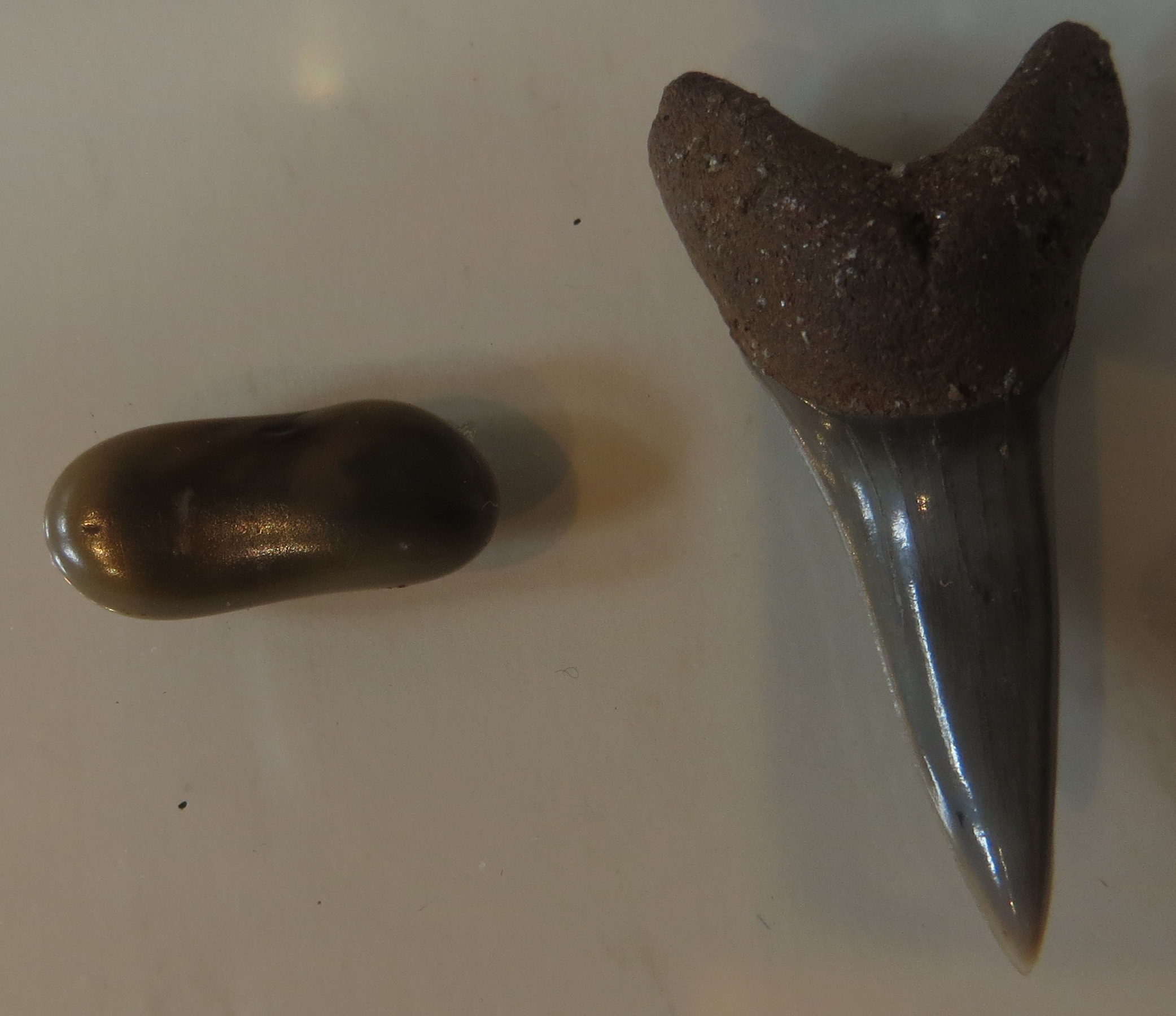
- Teeth in Natural History Museum, London.

Scientific classification
- Kingdom: Animalia
- Phylum: Chordata
- Class: Chondrichthyes
- Subclass: Elasmobranchii
- Division: Selachii
- Order: Lamniformes
- Family: Lamnidae
- Genus: Isurus
- Species: †I. desori

Binomial name
- †Isurus desori (Agassiz, 1843)

Synonyms
- Oxyrhina desori Agassiz, 1843

= Isurus desori =

Isurus desori Temporal range: Early Oligocene-Middle Miocene, 32.5–12.1 Ma

Extinct species of mackerel shark

Isurus desori, commonly known as the Desori mako shark or Desori shark, is an extinct species of mako shark, that lived in the Early Oligocene and Middle Miocene, between 32.5 and 12.1 million years ago. It measured 4.2 m (14 ft) long.

== Diet ==
The Isurus desori hunted squids, fish and marine mammals. The fossil of I. desori was discovered in the Chesapeake Bay region.

== Taxonomy ==
Isurus desori belongs to the family Lamnidae in the genus Isurus, and it is believed that it was the ancestor of the present-day mako shark (I. oxyrinchus). It is believed to be related to Cosmopolitodus hastalis and Carcharodon plicatilis as well.

Scientists believe that I. desori it evolved into the only two contemporary species, I. paucus and I. oxyrinchus, the only surviving species of the genus Isurus. It was once believed that I. desori belonged to the genus Oxyrhina, which is now considered a likely invalid or doubtful genus. Some paleontologist suggest that I. desori is a junior synonym of I. oxyrinchus.
