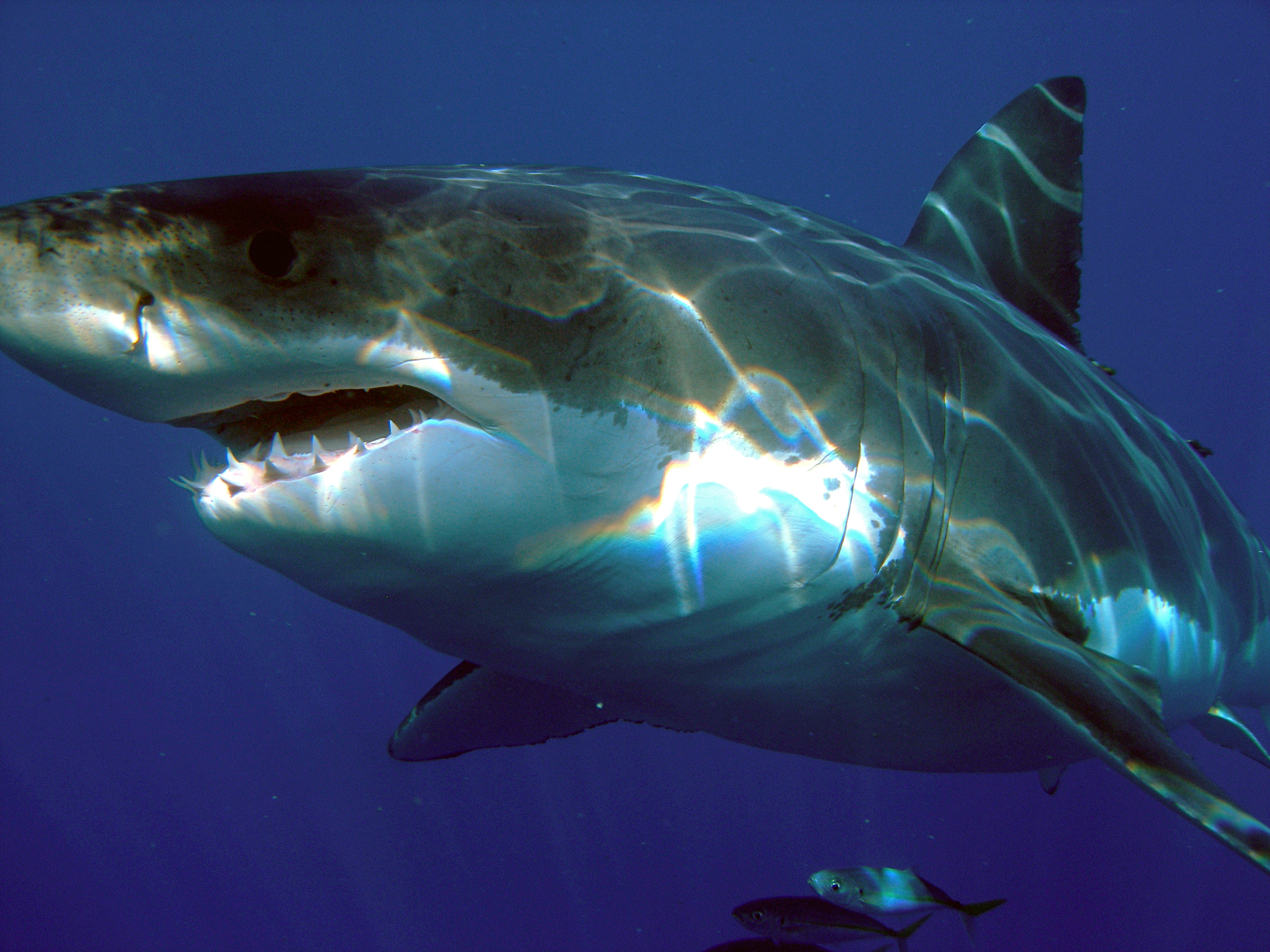
- Great white shark (Carcharodon carcharias)
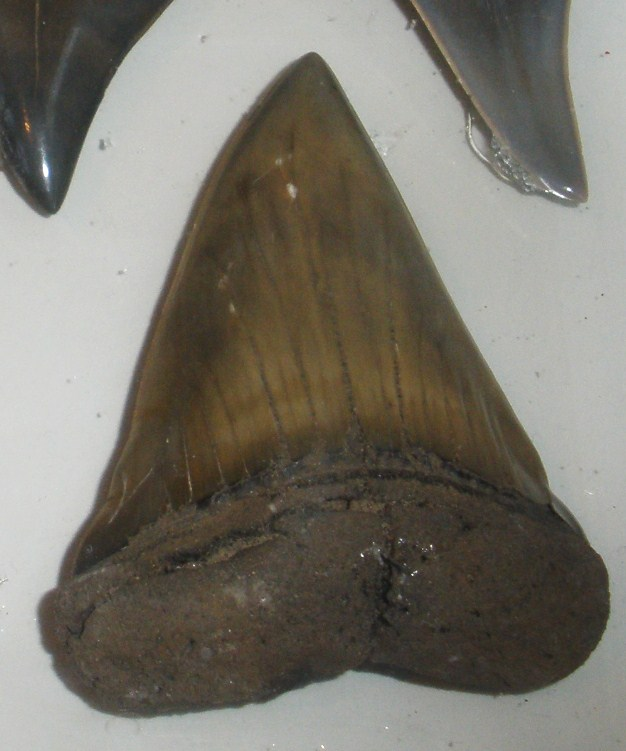
- Fossil of the teeth of Carcharodon hastalis from Naturalis museum, Leiden

Scientific classification
- Kingdom: Animalia
- Phylum: Chordata
- Class: Chondrichthyes
- Subclass: Elasmobranchii
- Division: Selachii
- Order: Lamniformes
- Family: Lamnidae
- Genus: Carcharodon; A. Smith, 1838

Type species
- Squalus carcharias Linnaeus, 1758

Species
- C. carcharias Linnaeus, 1758; †C. hubbelli Ehret et al., 2012; †C. hastalis Agassiz, 1843; †C. planus? Agassiz, 1856; †C. subserratus (escheri)? Agassiz, 1843; †C. plicatilis (xiphodon)? Agassiz, 1843; †C. caifassii Lawley, 1876

Synonyms
- Procarcharodon Casier, 1960; Cosmopolitodus? Glikman, 1964

= Carcharodon =

Carcharodon Temporal range: 20–0 Ma Oligocene to present

Genus of sharks

Carcharodon (from Ancient Greek κάρχαρος (kárkharos), meaning "sharp, jagged", and ὀδούς (odoús), meaning "tooth", and thus, "sharp tooth/jagged tooth") is a genus of sharks within the family Lamnidae, colloquially called the "white sharks". The only extant member is the great white shark (Carcharodon carcharias). Extinct species include C. hubbelli and C. hastalis. The first appearance of the genus in the fossil record may have been as early as the Late Oligocene, but certainly by the Early Miocene.

== Fossil history and evolution ==
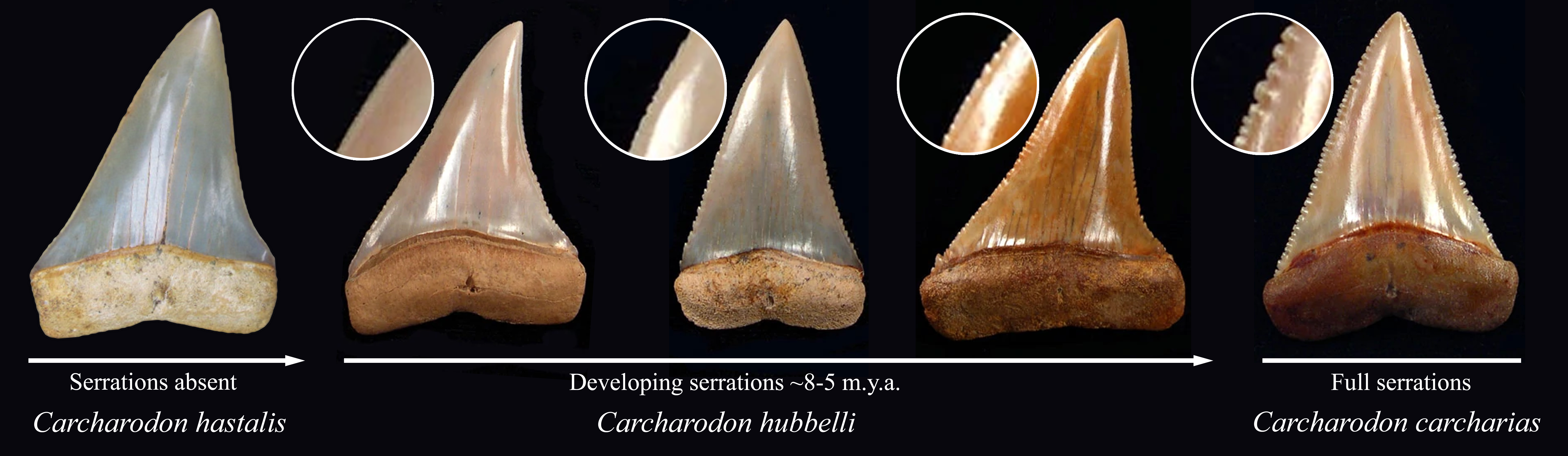
Tooth evolution in Carcharodon

The fossil ancestry of Carcharodon is an active area of research and debate, given the dearth of the fossil record and the incompleteness of found specimens. Most Carcharodon fossil remains of are in the form of teeth, along with some vertebral centra. This is the norm for fossilized Chondrichthyans, since a shark's skeleton is made of cartilage and soft tissues don't preserve well. Thus, assessing relationships between fossil species relies largely on the form of their teeth. This difficulty is compounded by the incomplete fossil record of Lamnids. However, some researchers have proffered Macrorhizodus, Isurolamna, and Cretalamna as candidates for genera ancestral to Carcharodon, taxa ranging from the Eocene to the Cretaceous. Though Cretalamna was proposed assuming Carcharodon descended from Otodus (Carcharocles), a now disfavored theory.

The earliest records of Carcharodon purportedly occur in the Late Oligocene but certainly in the Early Miocene. These records include specimens from southern Peru and northeastern Hungary. This assumes that the genus Cosmopolitodus is synonymous with Carcharodon (see further discussion below).

Carcharodon is well-represented in the fossil record by the Middle Miocene. The first widespread, cosmopolitan species being C. hastalis, with fossils recovered from North America, South America, Europe, Australia, and Asia. The modern great white shark has been posited to have evolved from C. hastalis through a transitional species, C. hubbelli. This is seen in the gradual development of serrations on the cutting edges of their teeth around the time of the Miocene-Pliocene boundary circa 5 million years ago. This adaptation plausibly made the dentition of C. hubbelli-carcharias more efficient at consuming marine mammals compared to the smooth-edged teeth of Late Miocene forms of C. hastalis; though there is ample evidence that C. hastalis still fed on marine mammals.

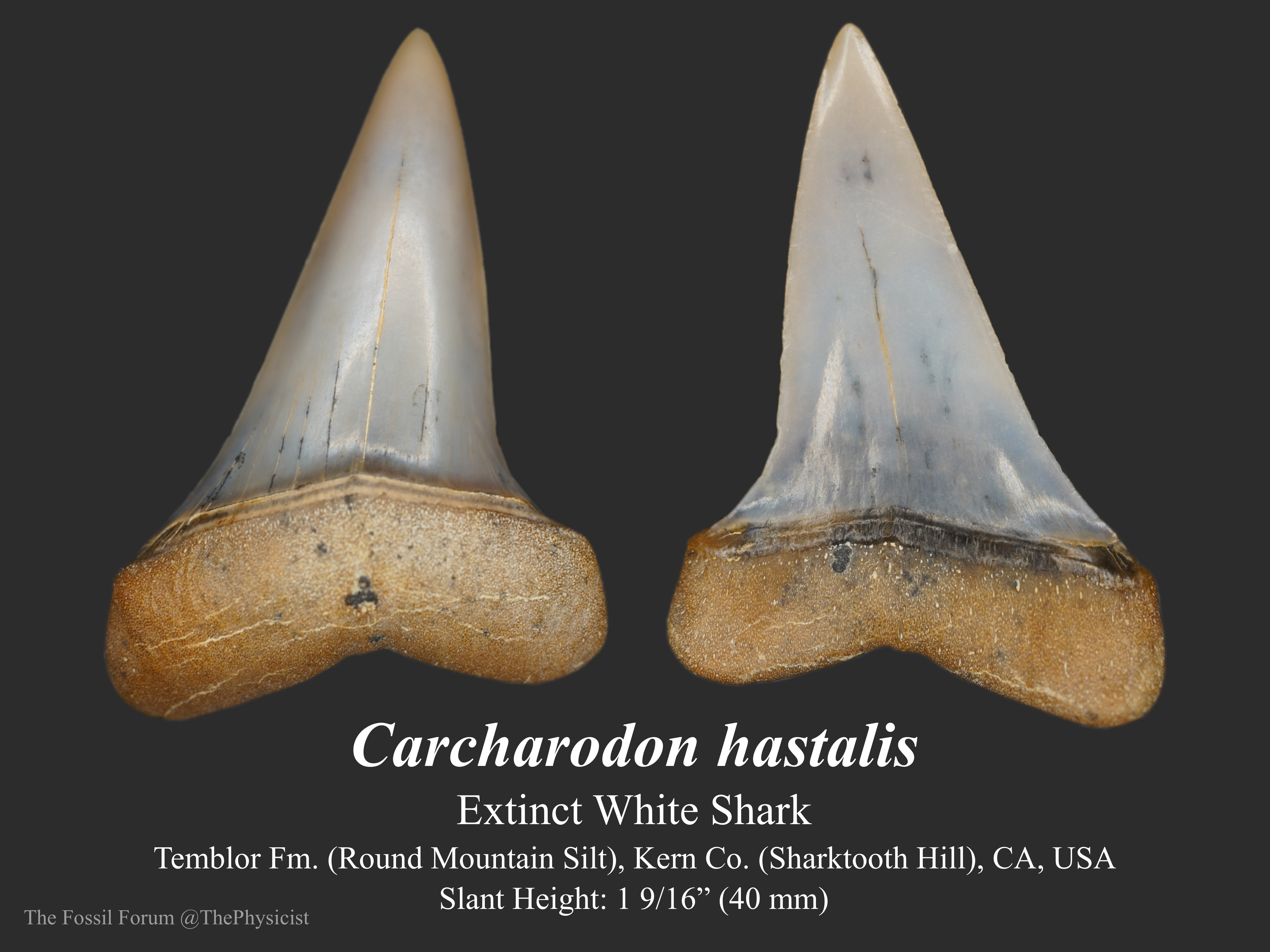
Extinct white shark tooth.

Study of white shark taxonomy is complicated by nomenclature and repeated taxonomic reassignments of various species. C. hastalis, I. subserratus, and C. planus traditionally were placed in Isurus, given their superficial similarity to the teeth of mako sharks. They were later reassigned to a new genus, Cosmopolitodus, a genus maintained as valid in some current literature, and considered a junior synonym of Carcharodon in others. C. hastalis has also been described as two morphotypes, "broad-form" and "narrow-form," which some authors have split into two species, C. plicatilis (xiphodon) and C. hastalis, respectively.

I. subserratus, historically known as C. escheri under the genus Carcharomodus, has recently been reclassified back in to the genus Carcharodon as C. subserratus, and then again into Isurus.

The fossil "mega-toothed" sharks like Megalodon have also traditionally been placed in Carcharodon, but most current literature refutes this position, placing mega-toothed sharks in a separate family, Otodontidae, and genus, Otodus (Carcharocles).

In 1876, fossils of a shark species referred to as the possible ancestor of the modern Great white shark (Carcharodon carcharias) were named Carcharodon caifassii by the paleontologist Maurice Leriche. C. caifassii is now placed as a probable junior synonym of C. carcharias due to the lack of sufficient diagnostic fossils.

== Species ==
- Carcharodon carcharias (Linnaeus, 1758) (the great white shark)
- †Carcharodon carcharias-f (Lawley, 1876)
- †Carcharodon hubbelli (Ehret et al., 2012) (Hubbell's white shark)
- †Carcharodon hastalis (Agassiz, 1843)
- †Carcharodon planus (Agassiz, 1856)
- †Carcharodon subserratus (escheri)? (Agassiz, 1843)
- †Carcharodon plicatilis (xiphodon)? (Agassiz, 1843)
- †Carcharodon caifassii (Lawley, 1876)
