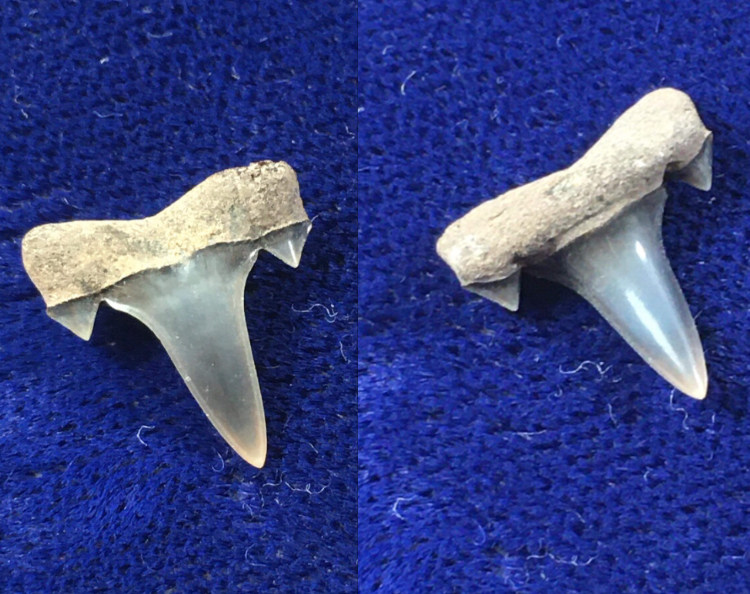
- Isurolamna inflata from the Eocene of Belgium

Scientific classification
- Kingdom: Animalia
- Phylum: Chordata
- Class: Chondrichthyes
- Subclass: Elasmobranchii
- Division: Selachii
- Order: Lamniformes
- Family: Lamnidae
- Genus: †Isurolamna; Cappetta, 1976

= Isurolamna =

Isurolamna Temporal range: Selandian-Rupelian

Genus of extinct lamnid shark

Isurolamna is an extinct genus of mackerel shark from the Paleogene period. It contains at least three species and a fourth is sometimes placed in it. It is thought to be closely related to Macrorhizodus, Isurus, and Carcharodon. Isurolamna arose in the Paleocene epoch during the Selandian age, and was extinct by the close of the Rupelian age of the Oligocene epoch. Some features which define this genus include a small, elliptical foramen (hole) in the middle of the lingual side of the root, triangular cusps except on lower interior teeth, and a relatively thick root with nearly vertical margins. The genus has a complicated taxonomic past.

== Species ==
The following species are ascribed to the genus:

Species	Notes	Images	Ref.
Isurolamna inflata	This is the earliest and most gracile species. It is known from the Late Palaeocene (Selandian/Thanetian) and Early Eocene (Ypresian) of North Africa, Europe, and North America. Isurolamna affinis typically refers to the paleocene variant which can be slightly more gracile and is probably a junior synonym, as is Lamna vincenti var inflata and Odontaspis hopei form affinis.	Isurolamna inflata from the Eocene of Belgium	
Isurolamna bajarunasi	Known mainly from the Mid-Late Eocene (Bartonian-Priabonian) of Kazakhstan, this species is more robust than I. inflata but less so than I. gracilis. It is likely a transitional species between the two. "Lamiostoma" menneri is a junior synonym.	Isurolamna bajarunasi from the Eocene of Kazakhstan	
Isurolamna gracilis	This species is known from the Early Oligocene (Rupelian) of Western Europe, and is the most robust species in this genus. This species was placed in a monotypic genus, Rhizoquadrangulus by Baut & Génault (1991) but this diagnosis is not widely endorsed by the scientific community. Lamna rupeliensis is a junior synonym with only lateral teeth.	Isurolamna gracilis teeth from the Oligocene of Kazakhstan and Germany	
Isurolamna(?) vandenbroeki	This is a rare species from the Early Oligocene (Rupelian) of Northwestern Europe and Kazakhstan. Baut & Génault (1999) placed it in the monotypic genus Lethenia. There is debate whether this is warranted or not but many subsequent authors have followed this diagnosis, particularly Cappetta (2012). Odontaspis Van den Broecki and Lamna Van den Broecki are junior synonyms. It is much more gracile than the contemporary I. gracilis and has widely separated cusplets.		
Isurolamna schoutedeni	A very rare species, originally named as species of genus Isurus, but replaced. The type specimens were named "Oxyrhina" schoutedeni, but replaced in Isurolamna genus in 2019. It lived in between the Late Early Ypresian stage, in Eocene epochs.		
