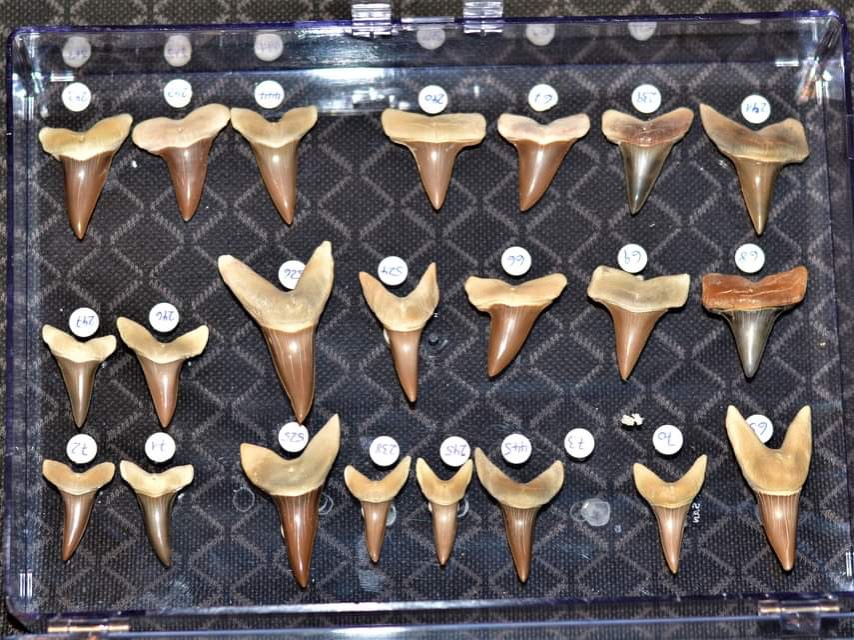
- Macrorhizodus praecursor from the Eocene of Kazakhstan

Scientific classification
- Kingdom: Animalia
- Phylum: Chordata
- Class: Chondrichthyes
- Subclass: Elasmobranchii
- Division: Selachii
- Order: Lamniformes
- Family: Lamnidae
- Genus: †Macrorhizodus; Glikman, 1964

= Macrorhizodus =

Macrorhizodus Temporal range: Ypresian - Rupelian

Extinct genus of mackerel shark

Macrorhizodus is an extinct genus of mackerel shark which lived from the early Eocene to early Oligocene epoch of the Paleogene period. It is often considered ancestral to Isurus and sometimes considered part of it. Macrorhizodus is also likely ancestral to Cosmopolitodus. It seems to be related to Isurolamna. It is known from isolated teeth and vertebral centra as well as at least two associated dentitions. It is an incredibly widespread shark, known from every continent except Australia. This includes a report from Antarctica.

== Species ==
The genus is composed of the following species:

Species	Notes	Images	Ref.
Macrorhizodus nolfi	This is an early Eocene (Ypresian) species. It is well known from the London Clay of England, the Aktulagay Formation of Kazakhstan, and other places in Eurasia.The species is notably absent in contemporary formations in North America.	Macrorhizodus nolfi from England	
Macrorhizodus praecursor	This species is from the mid Eocene to early Oligocene. Some authors restrict this species to the Lutetian stage, while other prefer to lump it with the next two. It is known from the lower Santee Limestone Formation of South Carolina, the Lutetian of Kazakhstan, the Piney Point Formation of Virginia, and other Lutetian localities, as well as from the Rupelian Red Bluff Clay of Alabama.	Macrorhizodus praecursor from Kazakhstan	
Macrorhizodus americanus	Also known as M. americana, this species is limited to the Bartonian. It is sometimes lumped with M. praecursor. It is best known from Kazakhstan, but has been found in other formations. It is known from the upper Santee Limestone Formation of South Carolina.	Macrorhizodus americana from Kazakhstan	
Macrorhizodus falcatus	This species is limited to the Priabonian. It is sometimes lumped with M. praecursor. It is common in the Samlat formation of Dakhla, Morocco.	Macrorhizodus falcatus from Morocco	

This genus appears to have undergone anagenesis, making it difficult to draw lines between species. Some authors prefer to lump and others to split. The early Oligocene species Macrorhizodus flandricus ascribed to this genus now usually considered to be a synonym of Isurus desori, sometimes styled Isurus desori flandrica. However, I. desori might itself be a junior synonym to I. oxyrhincus. This confusion stems from the proximity of Macrorhizodus to Isurus.
