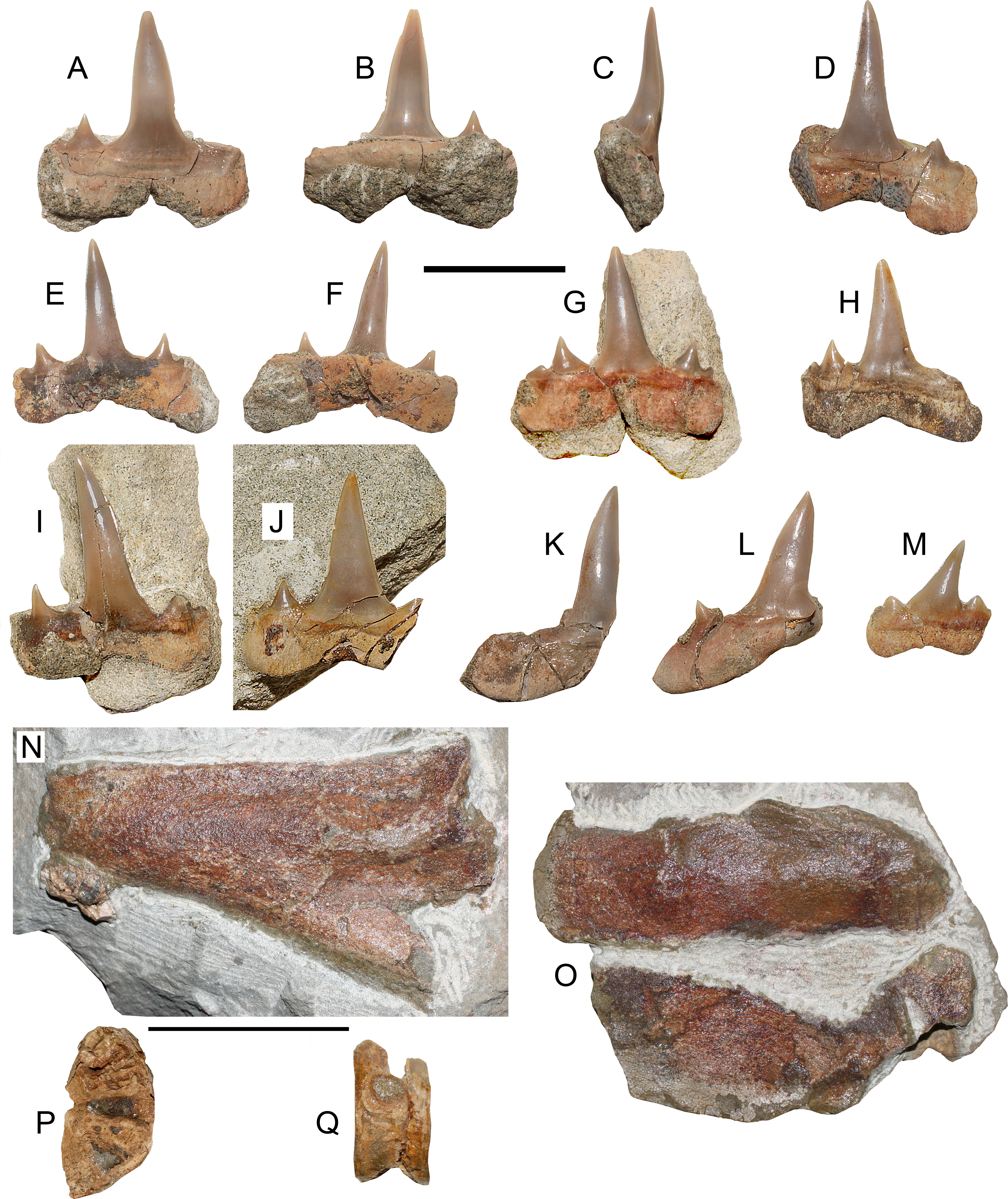
- Holotype of Lethenia carranzaensis.

Scientific classification
- Kingdom: Animalia
- Phylum: Chordata
- Class: Chondrichthyes
- Subclass: Elasmobranchii
- Division: Selachii
- Order: Lamniformes
- Family: Lamnidae
- Genus: †Lethenia; Baut & Génault, 1999

Type species
- †Odontaspis vandenbroecki Winkler, 1880

Species
- †L. vandenbroecki Winkler, 1880; †L. carranzaensis Otero, 2025

Synonyms
- Odontaspis vandenbroecki Winkler, 1880; Isurolamna vandenbroecki Nolf, 1986; Lamna vandenbroecki? Hocht, 1986

= Lethenia =

Lethenia Temporal range: Late Eocene–Early Oligocene

Extinct genus of mackerel sharks

Lethenia is an extinct genus of mackerel shark from the Eocene and Oligocene epochs. The type species, L. vanderbroecki, is from the early Oligocene (Rupelian age) of Belgium. It is considered closely related to Isurolamna and sometimes included within it. It differs in the morphology of its teeth, which are much more gracile than Isurolamna and has larger spacing between its crown and lateral cusps. A recently described species, L. carranzaensis, was found in the Eocene and Oligocene deposites of Chile, originally described as Isurolamna sp. fossil. Some paleontologist thinks that Lethenia can belongs in reality Lamna species, and not a separate genus, what would make Lethenia a junior synonym.

== Taxonomy ==
=== History ===
In 1880, the paleontologist Winkler, T.C. found a tooth cataloged as IRSNB P00717 which at the time was interpreted as a new species of shark of the genus Odontaspis, since the original fossil looked a lot like this genus, so it was named O. vandenbroecki. More than a century after the description of O. vandenbroecki, it was reclassified as a species of the genus Lamna, where its fossils resembled more "L. rupeliensis" and L. nasus, but later it was reclassified as belonging to the genus Isurolamna. This classification remained for more than a decade, until it was reclassified into its own genus, Lethenia, in 1999.

After a little more than a decade, a fossil was found that was determined to belong to the genus Isurolamna, but its species was not known. In 2025, it was suggested as a new species of the genus Lethenia, then being named L. carranzaensis, differing from L. vanderbroecki by having two rhomboid triangular lateral cusps on the anterior, lateral, and posterior teeth, with complete cutting edges reaching the base of the crown, root lobes almost subrectangular, especially in anterior and anterolateral teeth, and straight lateral cusps.
