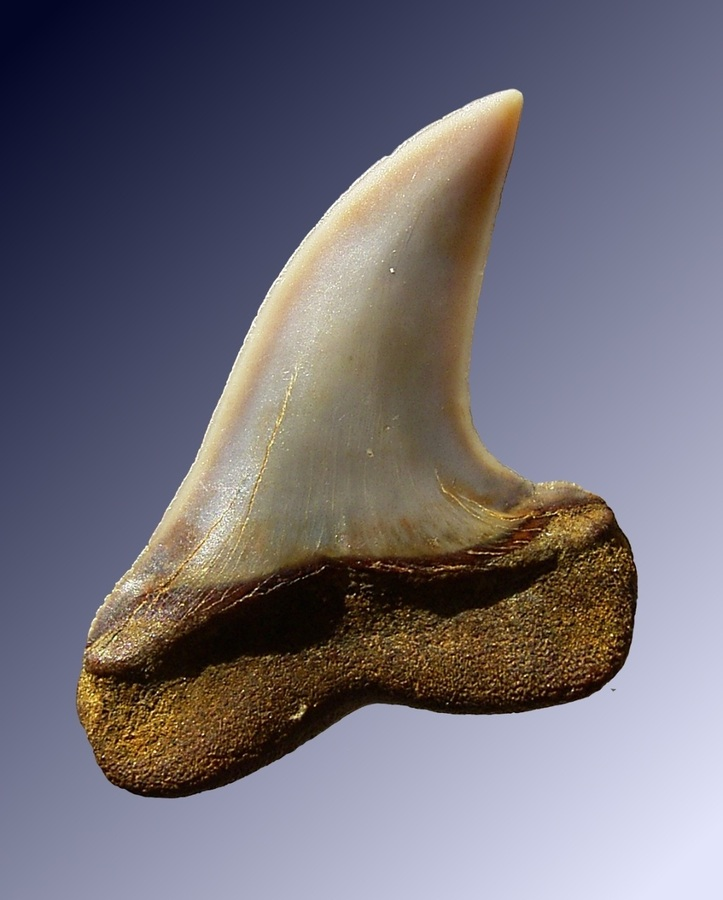
- Carcharodon planus's tooth

Scientific classification
- Kingdom: Animalia
- Phylum: Chordata
- Class: Chondrichthyes
- Subclass: Elasmobranchii
- Division: Selachii
- Order: Lamniformes
- Family: Lamnidae
- Genus: Carcharodon
- Species: †C. planus

Binomial name
- †Carcharodon planus (Agassiz, 1843)

Synonyms
- Isurus planus; Cosmopolitodus planus

= Carcharodon planus =

Carcharodon planus Temporal range: Miocene

Extinct species of shark

Carcharodon planus is an extinct shark belonging to the Lamnidae family of the Miocene epoch. It has curved teeth without lateral protrusions, and aside from this, it is similar to mako shark. The tooth length of C. planus reaches up to 4.8 cm (1.9 in). This suggests that C. planus was a large predatory shark similar to the modern mako shark.

== Description ==
C. planus lived throughout the entire Miocene epoch, from the earliest to the latest stage. It reached a maximum body length of about 3.2–3.6 m (10–12 ft).

=== Teeth ===
C. planus teeth are somewhat similar to those of other mackerel sharks, especially the extinct species C. hastalis and Isurus desori. Adult upper teeth are generally 2–4 cm long with an unserrated cutting edge and no lateral cusplets. True to its name, each tooth is "hooked", the point of which is shifted away from the middle axis, in the direction of the corners of the mouth. In this, the teeth of C. planus and I. desori differ from C. hastalis. I. desori teeth are much more heterodontic than C. planus and their roots are more uneven in thickness and shape, with more narrow builds and rounder lobes, somewhat making the appearance of a heart. But the crowns of the lower teeth of this species are described to be more straight and identical to the lower teeth of C. hastalis. The hooked teeth, which probably would be efficient for gripping prey, would suggest a diet of smaller and medium-sized animals.

== Paleobiology ==
C. planus is presumed to have preferred a diet similar to that of extant mako shark. The shape of its teeth is small, fast, and structured to catch slippery prey. This suggests that it primarily fed on small to medium-sized fish. It is also possible that it preyed on dolphins or pinnipeds smaller than itself.

== See also ==
- List of sharks
- List of prehistoric cartilaginous fish
