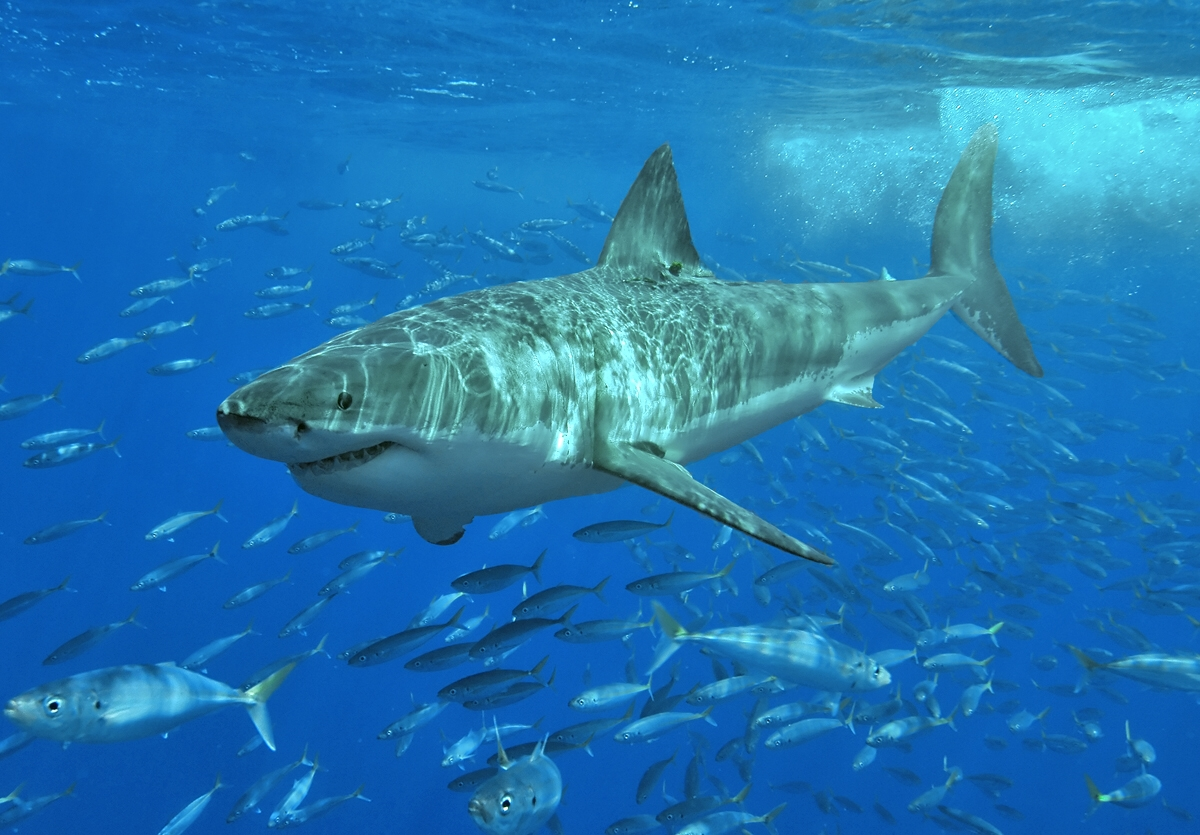
- Great white shark Carcharodon carcharias

Scientific classification
- Kingdom: Animalia
- Phylum: Chordata
- Class: Chondrichthyes
- Subclass: Elasmobranchii
- Division: Selachii
- Order: Lamniformes
- Family: Lamnidae; J. P. Müller and Henle, 1838

Extant genera
- Carcharodon; Isurus; Lamna; Extinct genera; see text

Synonyms
- Lamiostomatidae Gluckman, 1964; Isuridae Gray, 1851; Carcharodontidae Gill, 1892

= Lamnidae =

Mackerel sharks Temporal range: Upper Cretaceous–recent

Family of sharks

The Lamnidae are the family of mackerel sharks known as white sharks. They are large, fast-swimming predatory fish found in oceans worldwide, though they prefer environments with colder water. The name of the family is formed from the Greek word lamna, which means "fish of prey", and was derived from the Greek legendary creature, the Lamia.

These sharks have pointed snouts, spindle-shaped bodies, and large gill openings. The first dorsal fin is large, high, stiff and angular or somewhat rounded. The second dorsal and anal fins are minute. The caudal peduncle has a couple of less distinct keels. The teeth are gigantic. The fifth gill opening is in front of the pectoral fin and spiracles are sometimes absent. They are powerful, heavily built sharks, sometimes weighing nearly twice as much as other sharks of comparable length from other families. Many sharks in the family are among the fastest-swimming fish, although the massive great white shark is slower due to its large size.

== Genera and species ==
The family contains five living species in three genera and these selected extinct genera and species:

- Genus †Carchariolamna Hora, 1939
  - †Carchariolamna heroni Hora, 1939
- Genus Carcharodon Smith, 1838
  - Carcharodon carcharias (Linnaeus, 1758) (great white shark)
  - †Carcharodon hubbelli Ehret, Macfadden, Jones, Devries, Foster & Salas-Gismondi, 2012 (Hubbell's white shark)
  - †Carcharodon caifassii? "Bryant's or Common White shark" (Lawley, 1876)
- Genus †Corax Agassiz 1843
- Genus †Cosmopolitodus Glikman, 1964
  - †Cosmopolitodus hastalis Agassiz, 1843 (narrow mako shark)
  - †Cosmopolitodus xiphodon Agassiz, 1843 (giant white shark)
- Genus †Carcharomodus
  - †Carcharomodus escheri Agassiz, 1843
- Genus Isurus Rafinesque, 1810
  - Isurus oxyrinchus Rafinesque, 1810 (shortfin mako)
  - Isurus paucus Guitart-Manday, 1966 (longfin mako)
  - †Isurus desori Agassiz, 1843
  - †Isurus subserratus= Carcharomodus escheri Agassiz, 1843
  - †Isurus flandricus Leriche, 1910
  - †Isurus minutus? Agassiz, 1843
  - †Isurus nakaminatoensis Saito, 1961
  - †Isurus planus Agassiz, 1856
  - †Isurus praecursor Leriche, 1905
  - †Isurus rameshi Mehrotra, Mishra & Srivastava, 1973
- Genus †Isurolamna Cappetta, 1976
  - †Isurolamna affinis Casier, 1946
  - †Isurolamna bajarunasi Glikman & Zhelezko, 1985
  - †Isurolamna gracilis Le Hon, 1871
  - †Isurolamna inflata Leriche, 1905
- Genus †Karaisurus Kozlov in Zhelezko & Kozlov, 1999
  - †Karaisurus demidkini Kozlov in Zhelezko & Kozlov, 1999
- Genus †Lamiostoma Glikman, 1964
  - †Lamiostoma belyaevi Glikman, 1964
  - †Lamiostoma stolarovi Glikman & Zhelezko in Zhelezko & Kozlov, 1999
- Genus Lamna Cuvier, 1816
  - Lamna ditropis Hubbs & Follett, 1947 (salmon shark)
  - Lamna nasus Bonnaterre, 1788 (porbeagle)
  - †Lamna attenuata Davis, 1888
  - †Lamna carinata Davis, 1888
  - †Lamna hectori Davis, 1888
  - †Lamna marginalis Davis, 1888
  - †Lamna quinquelateralis Cragin, 1894
  - †Lamna trigeri Coquand, 1860
  - †Lamna trigonata Agassiz, 1843
- Genus †Lethenia Leriche, 1910
  - †Lethenia vandenbroecki Winkler, 1880
  - †Lethenia carranzaensis Otero, 2025
- Genus †Macrorhizodus Glikman, 1964
  - †Macrorhizodus americanus Leriche, 1942
  - †Macrorhizodus nolfi Zhelezko, 1999

== See also ==
- List of sharks
- Shark
- List of prehistoric cartilaginous fish
