= Astadelphis =

Astadelphis Temporal range: Pliocene (Upper Zanclean – Lower Piacenzian)
- Schematic dorsal view of the skull. Scale bar 100 mm

Scientific classification
- Kingdom: Animalia
- Phylum: Chordata
- Class: Mammalia
- Order: Artiodactyla
- Infraorder: Cetacea
- Family: Delphinidae
- Subfamily: Globicephalinae
- Genus: †Astadelphis; Bianucci, 1996
- Species: †A. gastaldii

Binomial name
- †Astadelphis gastaldii (Brandt, 1874)

Synonyms
- Steno gastaldii (Brandt, 1874)

Extinct genus of delphinid cetacea

Astadelphis is an extinct genus of Globicephaline delphinid cetacean from the Pliocene of the Sabbie d'Asti Formation of the Piedmont region of Northern Italy. Originally referred to as a species of the genus Steno, the type and only known species is Astadelphis gastaldii.

== Taxonomy and naming ==
The holotype of Astadelphis gastaldii (MGPT PU13884) was discovered in the late 19th century . It was named as an extinct species of the extant globicephaline genus Steno as Steno gastaldii by Brandt (1874). However Bianucci (1996) reclassified it is under the new genus name of Astadelphis. A.gastaldii is the only species of this genus.

== Palaeobiology ==
Trace fossils in the form of tooth marks on the bones of the holotype of Astadelphis gastaldii show that it was prayed on by a relative of the modern great white shark, Cosmopolitodus. The individual was attacked from below and behind, much like with modern prey species targeted by great white sharks. The deepest bite marks on the dolphin's ribs indicate the shark aimed for the abdomen of the dolphin to inflict a fatal bite quickly and incapacitate its prey, and that when the Astadelphis was attacked a second time, it was bitten near the dorsal fin, suggesting that the dolphin rolled over while injured. The size of the bites indicates further that the shark responsible was estimated to be 4 m (13 ft) long.
