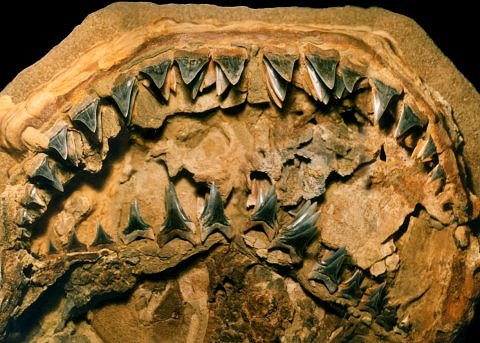
- Holotype jaws and teeth (UF 226255), also known as the Sacaco specimen

Scientific classification
- Kingdom: Animalia
- Phylum: Chordata
- Class: Chondrichthyes
- Subclass: Elasmobranchii
- Division: Selachii
- Order: Lamniformes
- Family: Lamnidae
- Genus: Carcharodon
- Species: †C. hubbelli

Binomial name
- †Carcharodon hubbelli Ehret et al., 2012

= Carcharodon hubbelli =

Carcharodon hubbelli Temporal range: Late Miocene-Early Pliocene (Tortonian-Zanclean) ~8–5 Ma

Extinct species of shark

Carcharodon hubbelli, also known as Hubbell's white shark, is an extinct species of white shark that evolved between 8 and 5 million years ago during the Late Miocene to Early Pliocene epochs. This shark is a transitional species, showing intermediate features between the extant great white shark and the fossil white shark, C. hastalis. C. hubbelli appears to be geographically restricted to the Pacific Ocean, with fossils of C. hubbelli recovered from Peru, Chile, California, and New Zealand. This exclusive distribution suggests a Pacific origin for the great white shark.

This shark was named in honor of Dr. Gordon Hubbell (the scientist who recovered the specimen from a farmer who found it in 1988) in recognition of his contribution to shark paleontology and for donating the specimen to the Florida Museum of Natural History in 2009. It was about the size of the modern great white shark, reaching 4.9–5.1 metres (16–17 ft) long. Its growth curve shows that it grew at a slower rate than the modern great white shark.

== Dentition ==
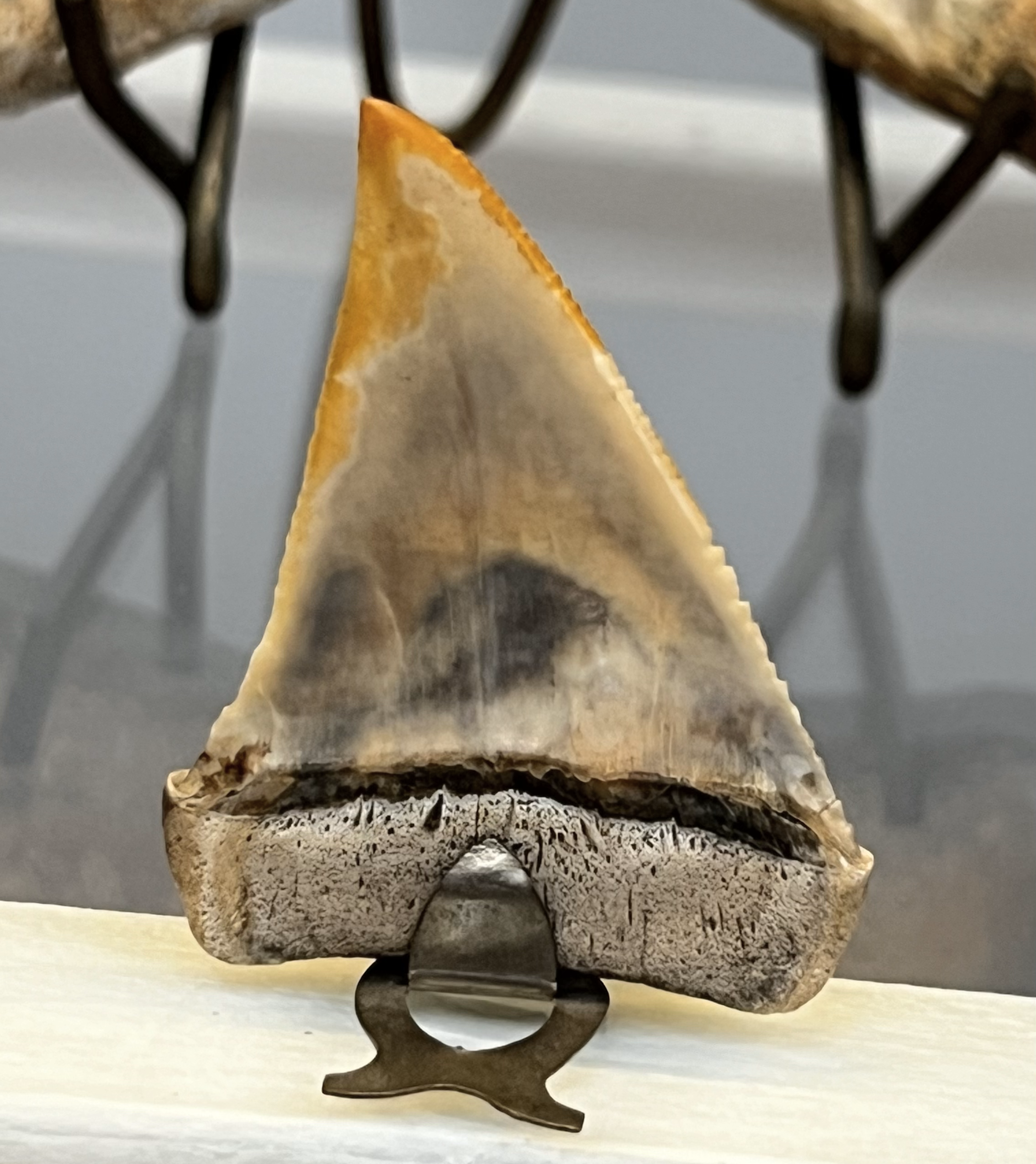
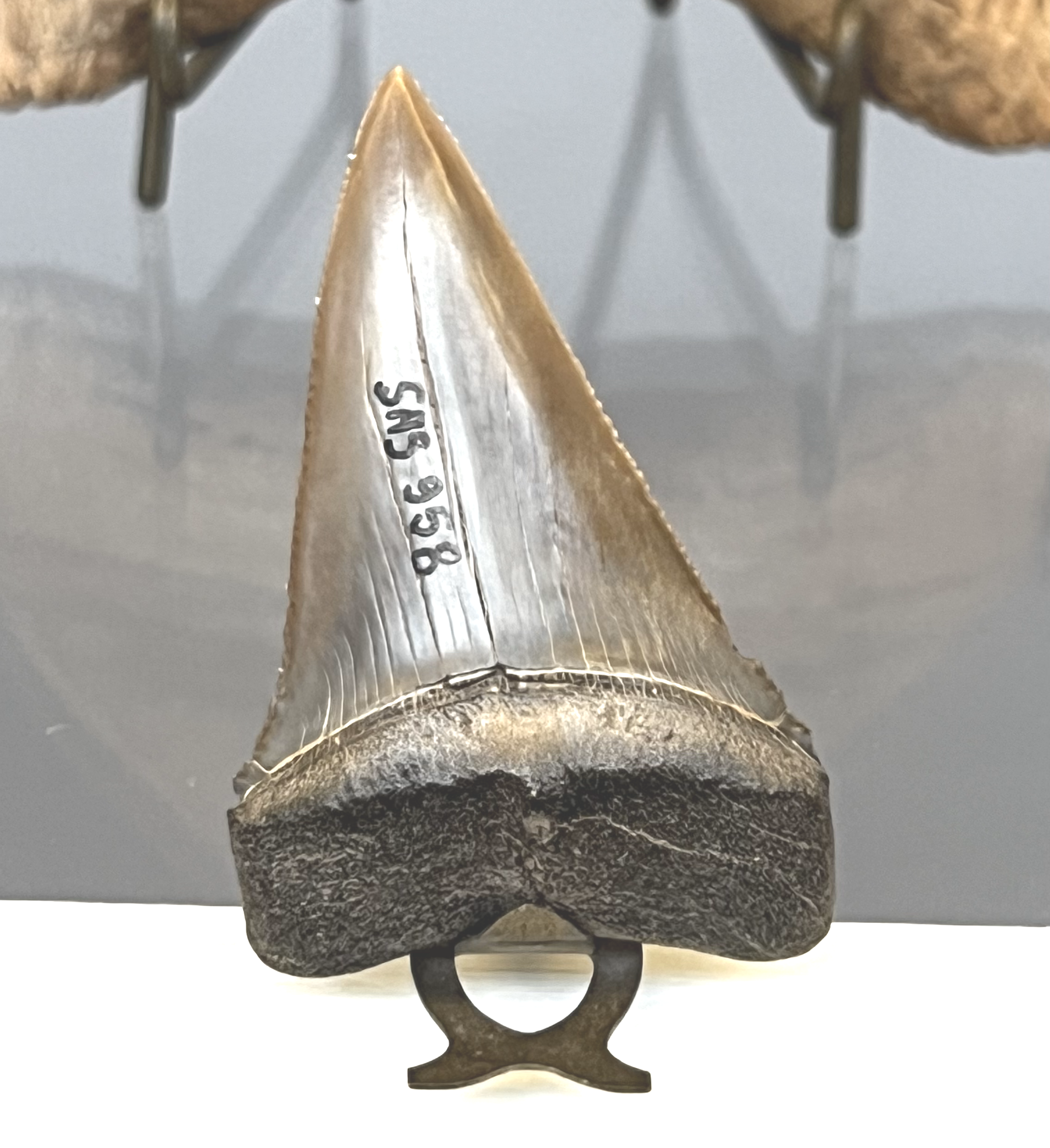
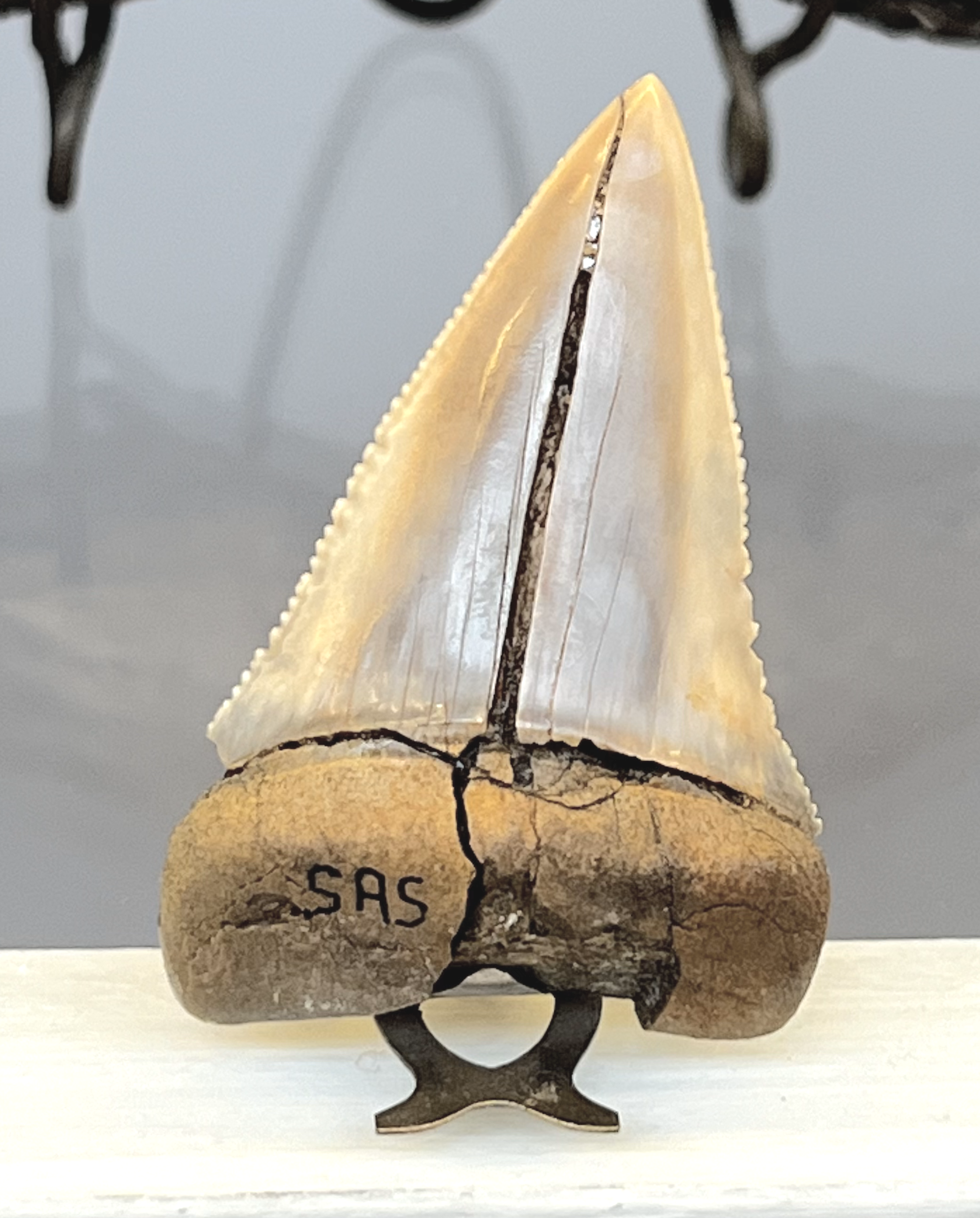
C. hubbelli teeth at different stages of serration development

Only one associated dentition of C. hubbelli is known (UF 226255), with a total of 222 teeth (and 45 vertebral centra). It was recovered from the Pisco Formation of Southern Peru. The tooth morphology is most similar to the extant great white, in having labiolingually flattened triangular cusps with serrated edges. The dentition differs from the extant species in having a distally-inclined upper intermediate tooth (it is mesially-inclined in the great white). The serrations are also qualitatively different, being finer and diminish in size apically (towards the tip).

As a transitional species, C. hubbelli possesses a mixture of features present in extinct white sharks like C. hastalis and in the extant white shark, C. carcharias. The distal inclination of the intermediate tooth is characteristic of C. hastalis, but the presence of serrations (though not fully developed) and a second upper anterior tooth larger than the lower second anterior tooth are characteristic of C. carcharias.

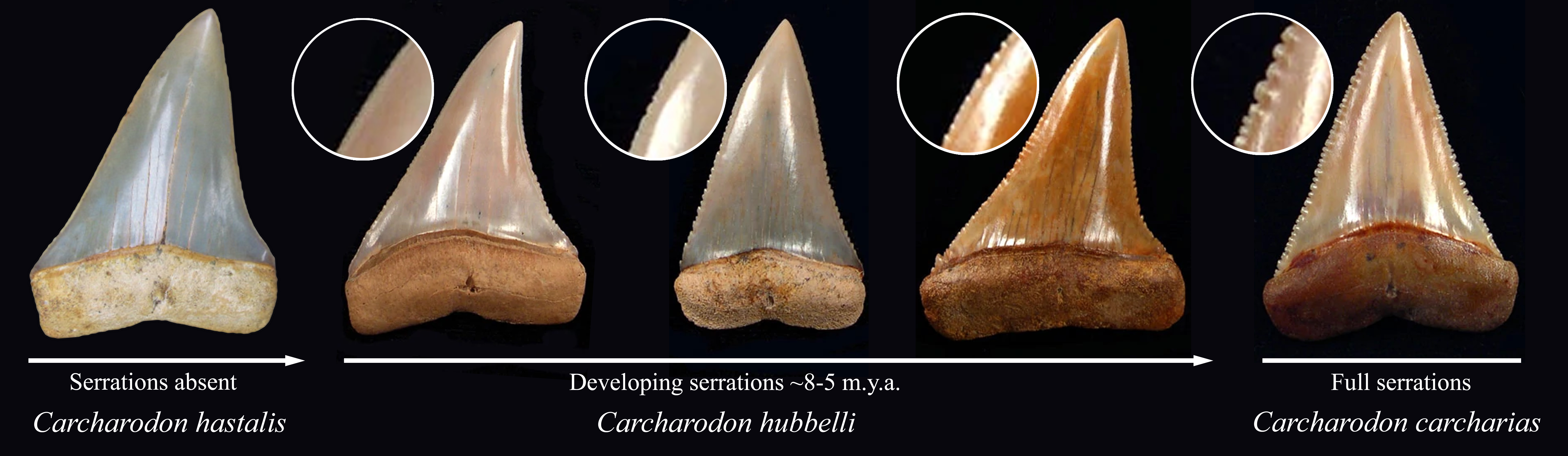
Transition of C. hubbelli

== Ecology ==
The development of serrated edges on the teeth of C. hubbelli suggest a shift in its diet to rely more on marine mammals as in C. carcharias. The bone of a scavenged mysticete whale with a tooth of C. hubbelli embedded within it supports this hypothesis.
