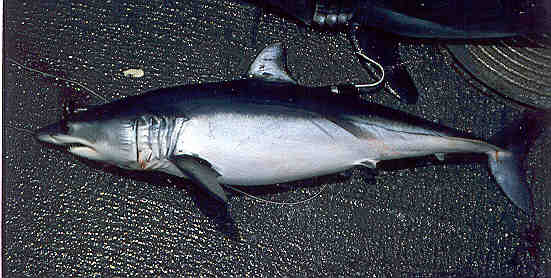
- Shortfin mako shark (I. oxyrinchus)
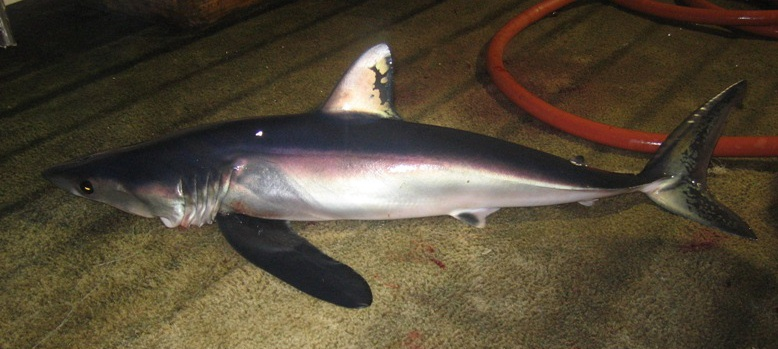
- Longfin mako shark (I. paucus)

Scientific classification
- Kingdom: Animalia
- Phylum: Chordata
- Class: Chondrichthyes
- Subclass: Elasmobranchii
- Division: Selachii
- Order: Lamniformes
- Family: Lamnidae
- Genus: Isurus; Rafinesque, 1810

Type species
- Isurus oxyrinchus Rafinesque, 1810

Synonyms
- Anotodus Le Hon, 1871; Isuropsis Gill, 1862; Lamiostoma Glückman, 1964; Oxirhyna Costa, 1866; Oxyrhina Agassiz, 1838; Oxyrhine

= Mako shark =

Mako shark Temporal range: Early Oligocene - recent

Genus of sharks

Mako sharks are predatory mackerel sharks of the genus Isurus (meaning "equal tail"). They are largely pelagic, and are fast, predatory fish capable of swimming at speeds of up to 50 km/h (31 mph). The two species of mako sharks are sexually dimorphic, with females being larger than males, and are large sharks. Both species are classified as "Endangered" by the IUCN.

Two species of mako shark currently exist: The shortfin mako shark, and the longfin mako shark. The shortfin mako shark is the fastest shark in the world, capable of speeds of 74 km/h (46 mph) in bursts. The longfin mako shark is the larger and slower of the two, reaching upwards of 2.5 m (8.2 ft) in length and weighing over 70 kg (150 lb); it is the second largest shark in its family, Lamnidae, after the great white shark.

== Fossil history and evolution ==
Although fossil teeth of Isurus have been reported from as early as the Late Cretaceous, they are likely to be of a shark with a similar dentition, Cretoxyrhina; since at one point they were considered to be the same (now defunct) genus Oxyrhina, and modern referrals to Isurus in the Cretaceous are scant. The earliest appearance of Isurus proper seems to be during the Oligocene with Isurus desori.

There has been much debate and speculation about the evolutionary origin and relationships between Isurus and its closest relatives, including the extant great white shark (Carcharodon carcharias). Molecular clock analyses place the last common ancestor of Isurus and Carcharodon between 43–60 million years ago during the Late Paleocene-Early Eocene. This insight should guide efforts to better resolve the fossil ancestry of both lineages, by providing a window of time in which to search for ancestor candidates.

Many fossil species of Lamnids have historically been placed under Isurus, which are now largely considered separate genera. These include species of Carcharodon (Cosmopolitodus) like C. hastalis, C. planus, species of Macrorhizodus, Isurolamna, and others.

== Description ==
The two living species are the shortfin mako shark (I. oxyrinchus) and the longfin mako shark (I. paucus). They range in length from 2.5 to 4.5 m (8.2 to 14.8 ft), and have an approximate maximum weight of 680 kg (1,500 lb). They both have a distinctive blue-gray color scheme common among mackerel sharks.

== Species ==
The genus contains these species:

- Isurus oxyrinchus (Rafinesque, 1810) (shortfin mako shark)
- Isurus paucus (Guitart-Manday, 1966) (longfin mako shark)
- †Isurus desori (Agassiz, 1843)
- †Isurus retroflexus (Agassiz, 1843)
- †Isurus planus? (Agassiz, 1843)(questionable)

== See also ==
- Shortfin mako shark
- Longfin mako shark
- White sharks
- List of prehistoric cartilaginous fish
- Shark meat
