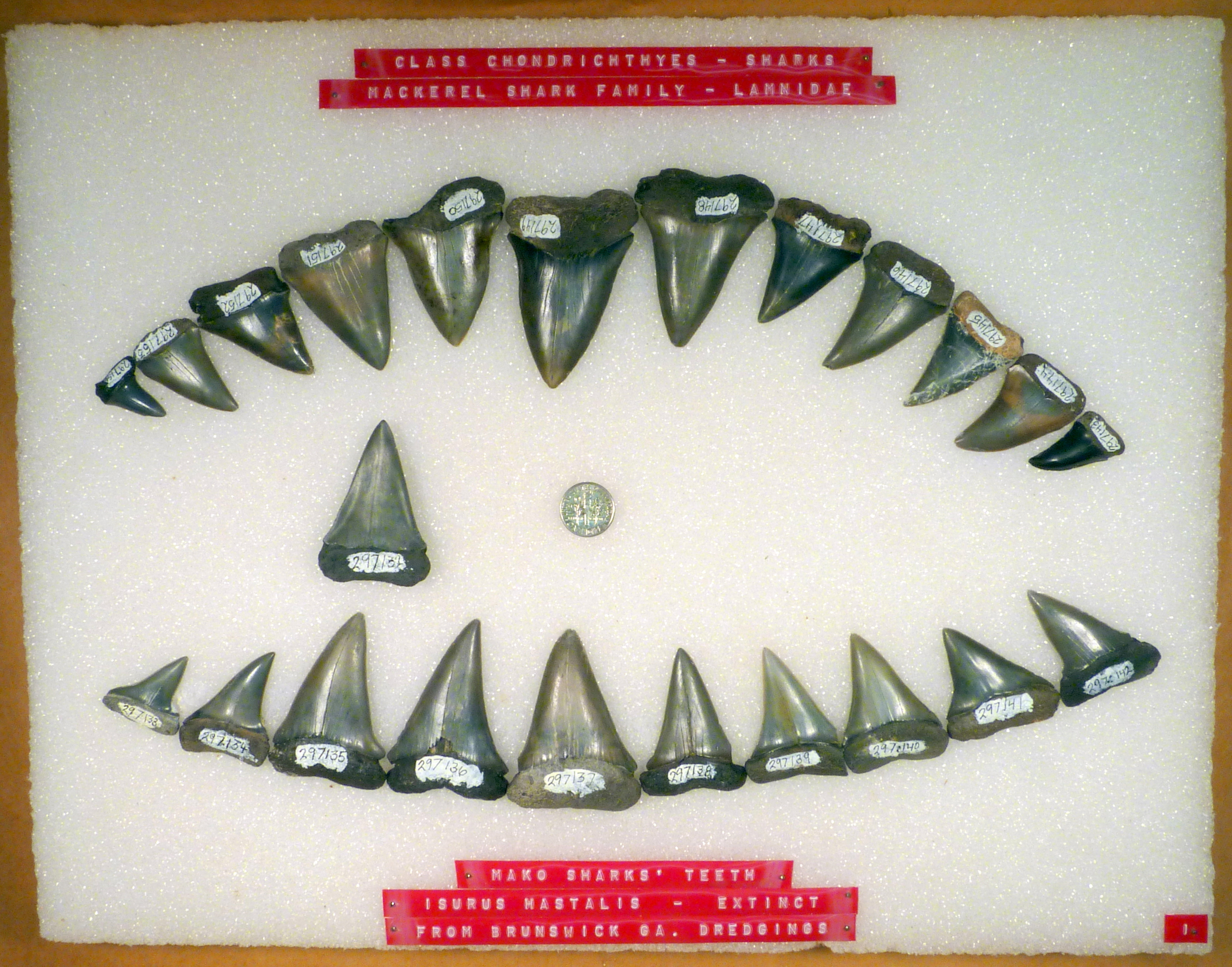
- Tooth series of Carcharodon hastalis

Scientific classification
- Kingdom: Animalia
- Phylum: Chordata
- Class: Chondrichthyes
- Subclass: Elasmobranchii
- Division: Selachii
- Order: Lamniformes
- Family: Lamnidae
- Genus: Carcharodon
- Species: †C. hastalis

Binomial name
- †Carcharodon hastalis Agassiz, 1843

Synonyms
- Cosmopolitodus hastalis (Agassiz, 1843); Cosmopolitodus xiphodon? (Agassiz, 1838); Cosmopolitodus plicatilis? (Agassiz, 1843); Isurus hastalis (Agassiz, 1843); Isurus xiphodon? (Agassiz, 1843); Lamna xiphodon? (Agassiz, 1838); Carcharodon plicatilis? (Agassiz, 1843); Oxyrhina hastalis (Agassiz, 1843); Oxyrhina xiphodon? (Agassiz, 1843)

= Carcharodon hastalis =

Carcharodon hastalis Temporal range: Late Oligocene-Early Pleistocene, 30–1.07 Ma

Extinct species of mackerel shark

Carcharodon hastalis is an extinct species of mackerel shark that lived between thirty and one million years ago during the late Oligocene to the Early Pleistocene epochs. The maximum adult length is estimated between 5–7 m (16–23 ft) or 8.22 m (27.0 ft).

Its teeth can reach lengths up 7.5 centimeters (3.0 in) and are found worldwide. It is believed to be an ancestor to the modern day great white shark, an argument supported by the transitional species Carcharodon hubbelli.

== Taxonomy ==
A study on the phylogenetic relationship between Carcharodon hastalis and Carcharodon carcharias concluded that there is indeed a putative sister species of C. carcharias distinct from C. hastalis and proposed the taxon Carcharodon plicatilis for it, resolving the paraphyly issue.

== Description ==
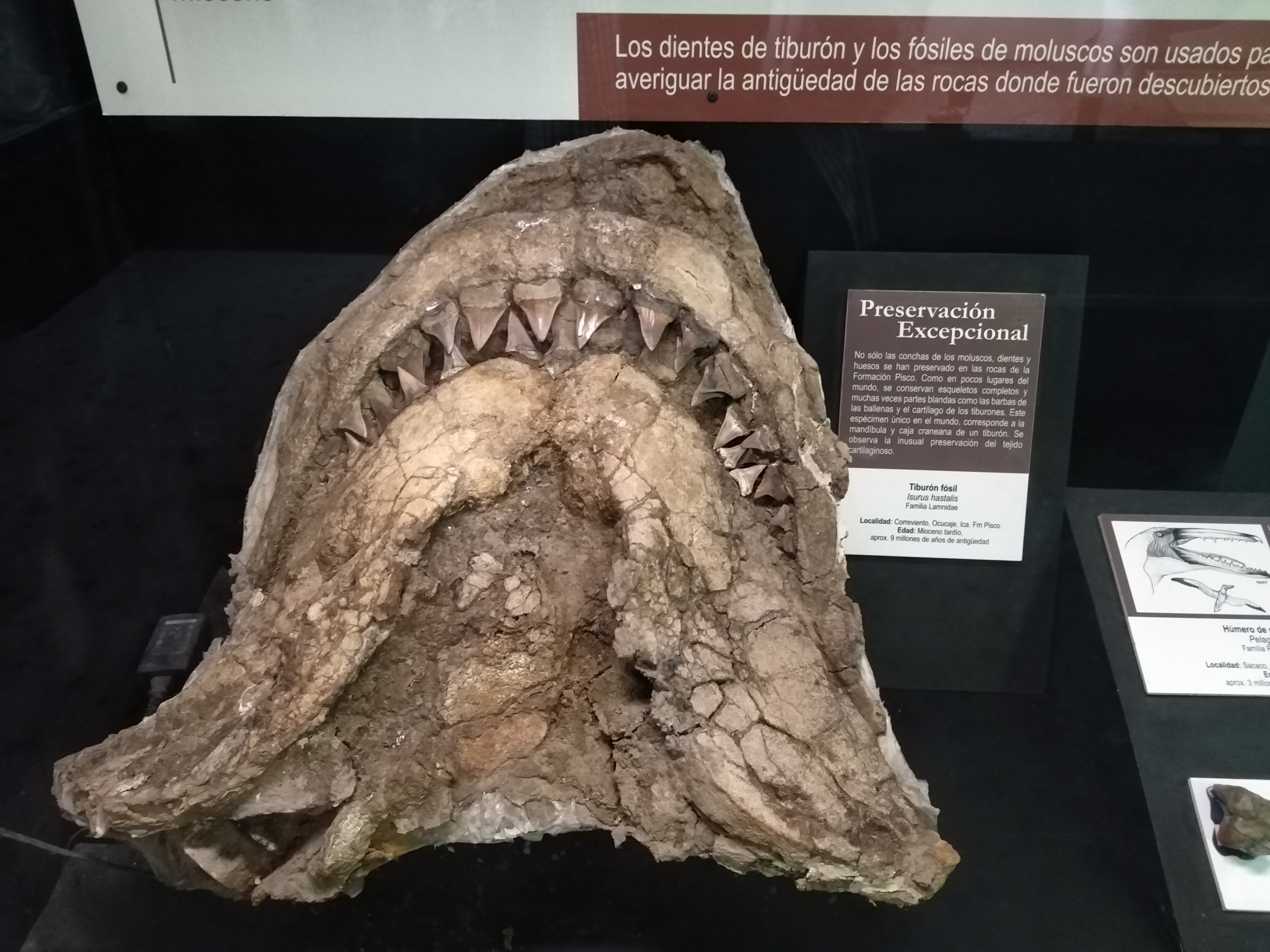
Carcharodon hastalis jaws

Carcharodon hastalis teeth can grow up to 7.5 cm (3.0 in) in length, suggesting a large shark. It was a very sharp and powerful cutting shape without a side saw blade. Its body was probably similar to that of modern great whites. It is also believed to have a cosmopolitan distribution, with C. hastalis teeth being found worldwide.

=== size ===
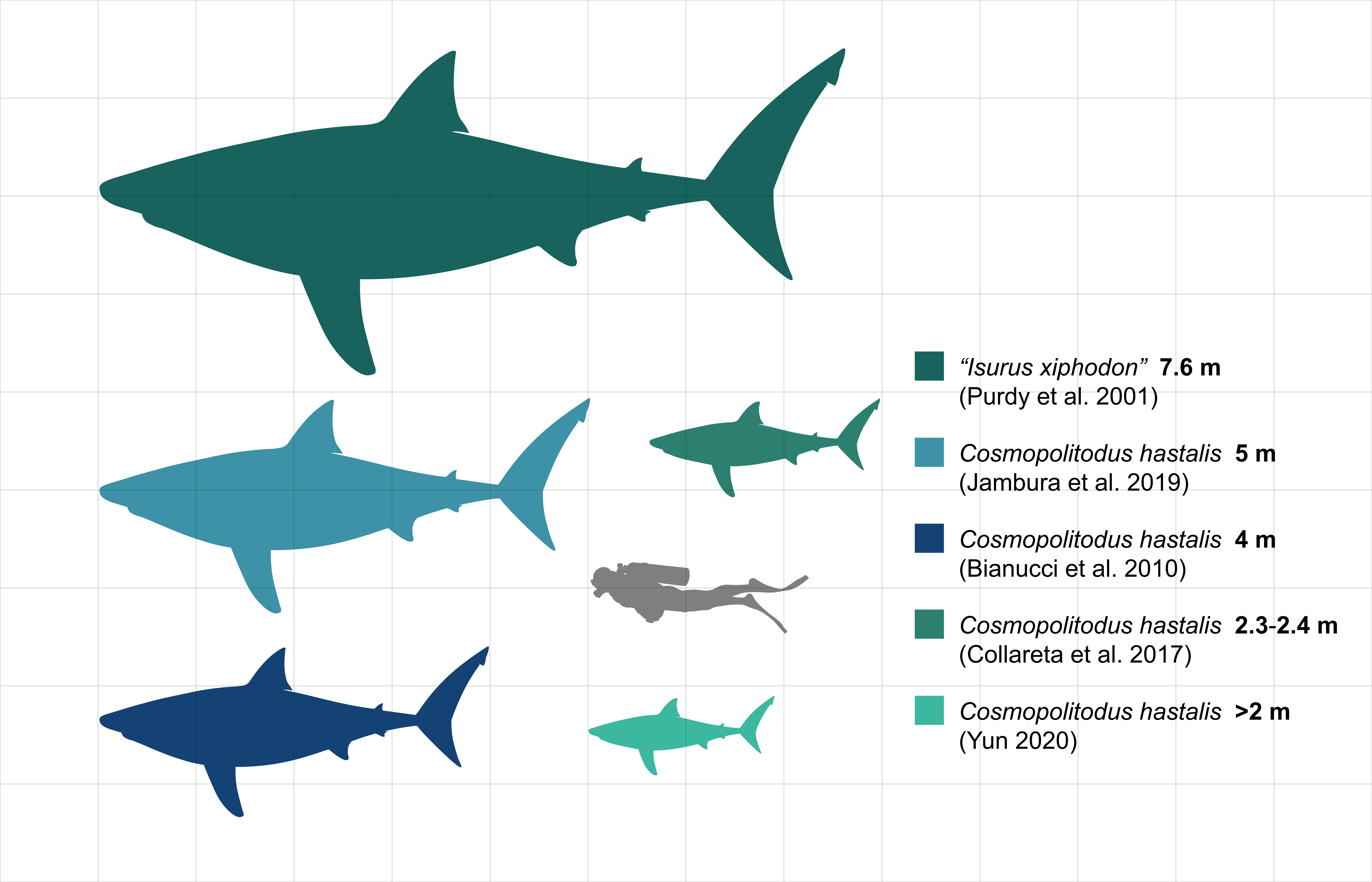
Top Carcharodon plicatilis, followed by adult maximum, average length and smallest individual length comparison (Carcharodon hastalis is labeled as Cosmopolitodus)

The maximum adult length is estimated between about 5–7 m (16–23 ft). Smaller individuals were about 1.8–4.6 m (5.9–15.1 ft) long.

A 2025 study of fossil lamnid sharks from Chile estimated adult Carcharodon hastalis to have generally reached approximately 4–7 m (13–23 ft) in total length, with the largest individual examined estimated at about 8.22 m (27.0 ft). The average for adults was 5.38 m (17.7 ft).

==== Broad-form ====
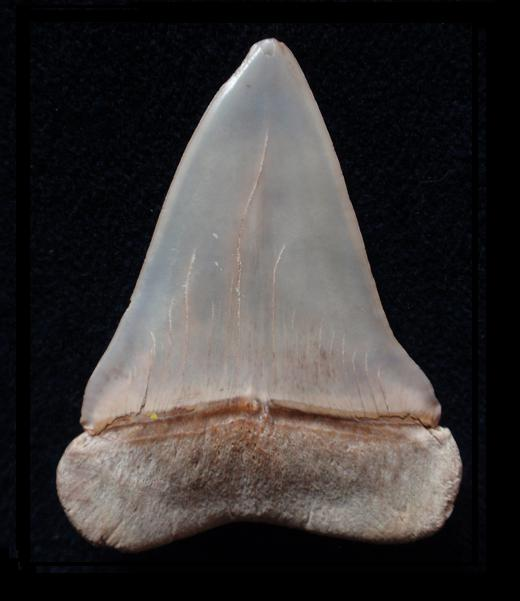
A broad form C. hastalis tooth

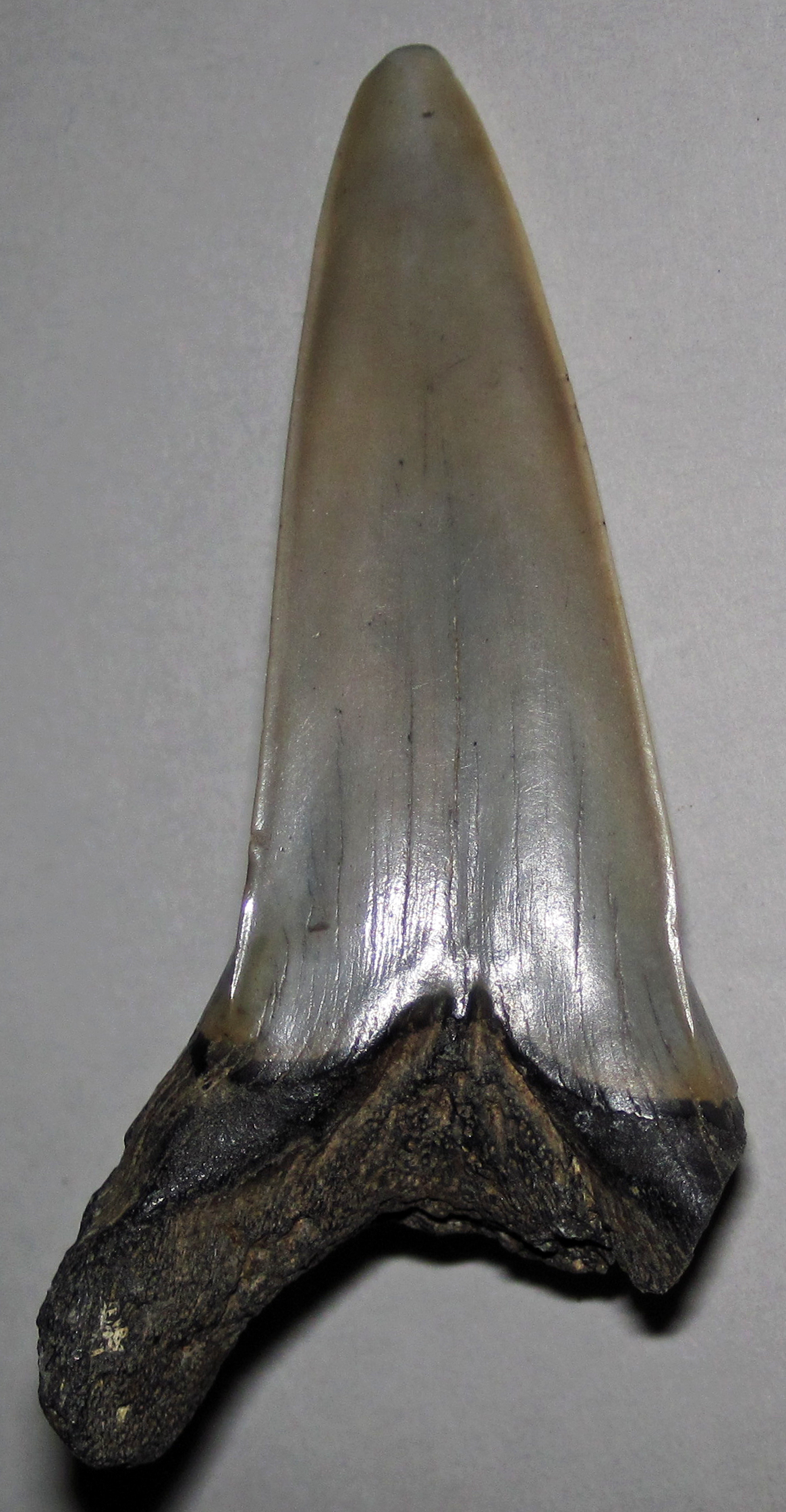
A narrow form C. hastalis tooth

The broad form is characterized by broad-shaped teeth often described as being identical to that of modern great whites besides the lack of serrations. Fossil evidence shows that the broad-form is the direct ancestor of the species Carcharodon carcharias, and from the Pisco Formation in Peru show an evolutionary mosaic between them. Some discussions classify the broad form as Carcharodon plicatilis.

== Paleobiology ==
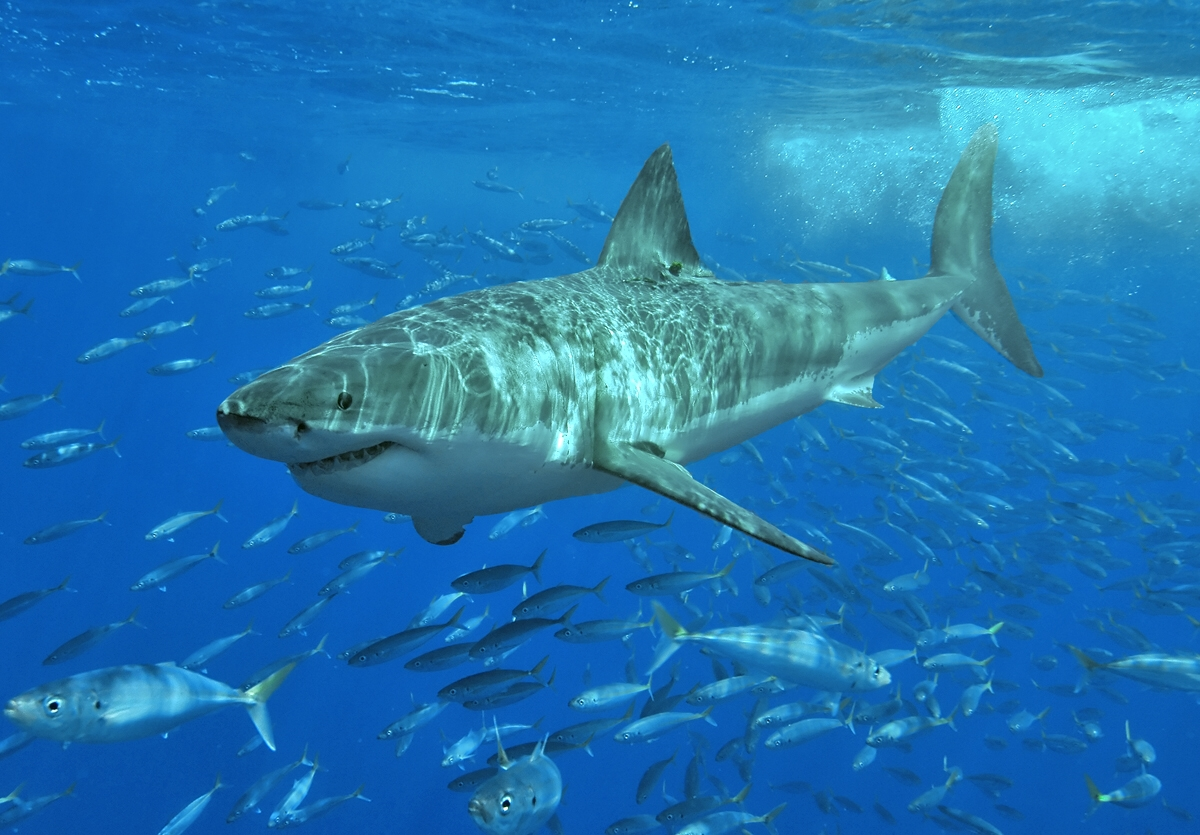
C. hastalis occupied a niche similar to the modern-day (Carcharodon carcharias)

Its large size, fossil record, and Reaching 7.5 centimeters (3.0 in) large sharp hunting teeth suggest that Carcharodon hastalis was a active predator. According to the fossil record it probably ate small whales, dolphins, tuna, and other fast pelagic fish, as well as seals. This is a predatory diet similar to that of the modern great white shark, and C. hastalis included more fish in its diet than modern great white shark.The trophic level of C. hastalis was lower than or similar to that of the great white shark..

=== Hunting behavior ===
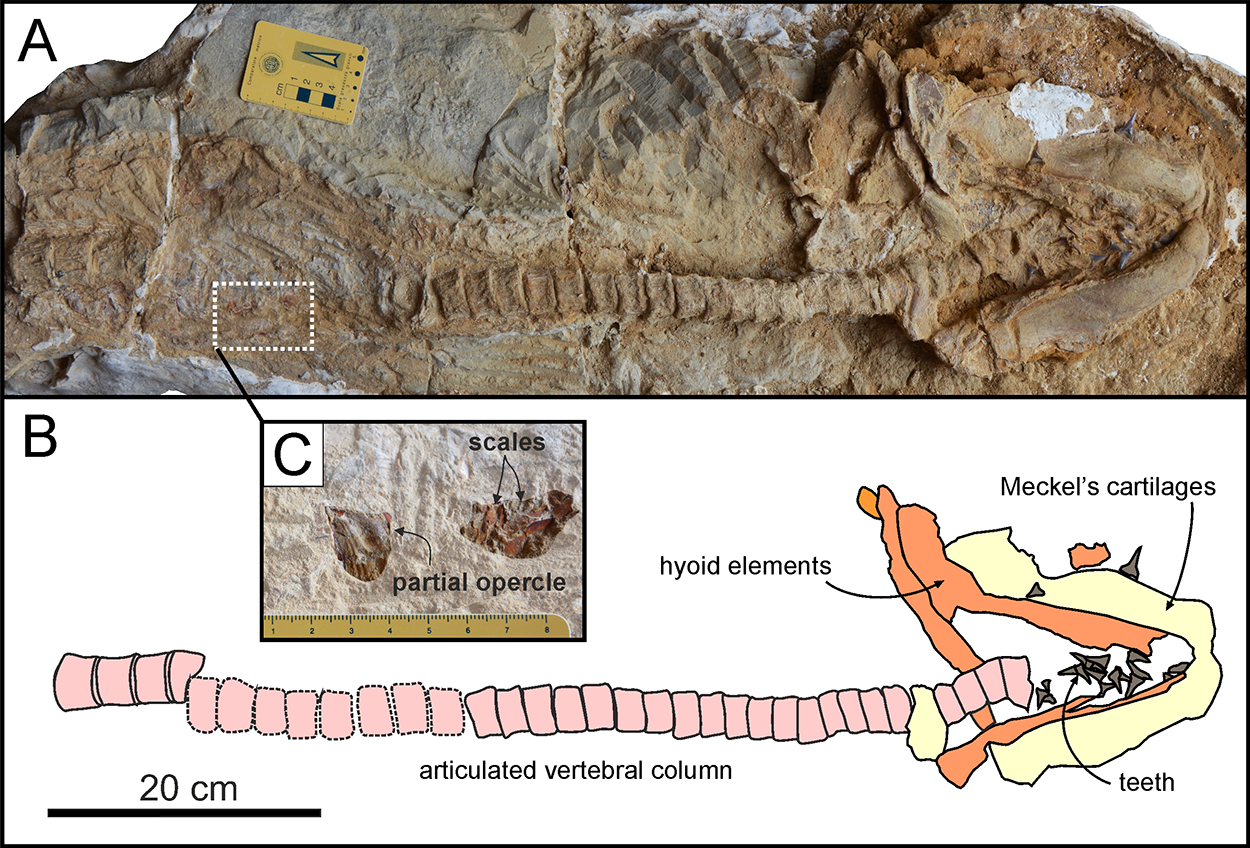
Specimen CPI-7899, featuring aggregate of skeletal and dermal fish remains

C. hastalis was a confirmed hunter of marine mammals. It most likely would have been one of the major predators in its ecosystem, preying upon small whales and other mammals. Trace fossils in the form of tooth marks on the bones of a Pliocene dolphin of the species Astadelphis gastaldii reveal that C. hastalis attacked its prey from below and behind, much like the modern great white shark does. The deepest bite marks on the dolphin's ribs indicate the shark aimed for the abdomen of its prey to inflict a fatal bite quickly and incapacitate its prey, and that when the dolphin was attacked a second time, it was bitten near the dorsal fin, suggesting that the dolphin rolled over while injured. The size of the bites indicates further that the shark responsible was estimated to be 4 m (13 ft) long.

A well-preserved skeleton of a juvenile C. hastalis from Peru described in 2017 showcases that the shark also included fish in its diet. Stomach contents preserved with the fossil show this shark also fed on pilchards such as ancient sardines (genus Sardinops), suggesting bony fish featured prominently in the shark's diet while it was young.

=== competing hypotheses ===
Primitive great white sharks such as C. hasalis preferred different habitats from Otodus megalodon and unilaterally is avoided them. This suggests that Otodus megalodon competitively excluded great white shark, including C. hasalis.
