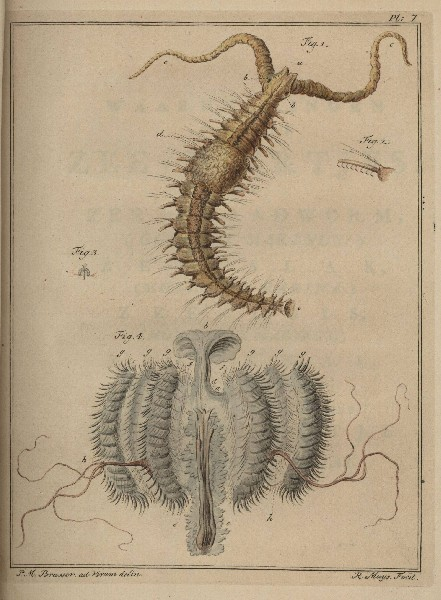
- P. ciliata (above)

Scientific classification
- Domain: Eukaryota
- Kingdom: Animalia
- Phylum: Annelida
- Clade: Pleistoannelida
- Clade: Sedentaria
- Order: Spionida
- Family: Spionidae
- Genus: Polydora
- Species: P. ciliata

Binomial name
- Polydora ciliata (Johnston, 1838)

Synonyms
- Leucodore audax Quatrefages, 1866; Leucodore ciliatus Johnston, 1838; Leucodore ciliatus minuta Grube, 1855; Leucodore dubius Quatrefages, 1866; Leucodore fabricii Quatrefages, 1866; Leucodore nasutus Quatrefages, 1866; Metadasydytes quadrimaculatus Roszczak, 1971; Polydora agassizii Claparède, 1869; Polydora audax Quatrefages, 1866

= Polydora ciliata =

Species of annelid

Polydora ciliata is a species of annelid worm in the family Spionidae, commonly known as a bristleworm. It is a burrowing worm and is found in the northeastern Atlantic Ocean and some other parts of the world.

== Taxonomy ==
Polydora ciliata was first described in 1838 by the Scottish physician and naturalist George Johnston as Leucodore ciliatus, but was later placed in the genus Polydora. A planktonic organism was described as Metadasydytes quadrimaculatus in 1971 by Roch Roszczak, who placed it in the phylum Gastrotricha; it was later established that the animal he was describing was in fact the larval stage of a spionid worm, probably Polydora ciliata.

== Description ==
The species can grow to a length of about 30 mm (1.2 in) with around 180 segments. The front of the prostomium (head) has no eyes or antennae, but the hind part has a pair of long palps and up to four eyes. The multi-segmented body is broadest fairly near the front and then tapers gradually to the pygidium (terminal segment) which bears a funnel. Each segment bears parapodia (outgrowths) and chaetae (bristles), the ventral branches of the parapodia being triangular or finger-like, and these structures reducing in size towards the rear of the animal. On segment five, the bristles are specially modified for burrowing. Gills are present on all the segments beyond 7 except for the last 10 to 20 segments.

== Distribution and habitat ==
P. ciliata has a widespread distribution round the coasts of northwestern Europe. As a burrowing species, it tunnels into limestone; chalk and clay, calcareous algae, the holdfasts of seaweeds, wood, muddy sediment and mollusc shells, including those of oysters, mussels and periwinkles. It is also known from the Mediterranean Sea, the Red Sea, the Black Sea, the Indo-Pacific and Antarctica.

== Ecology ==
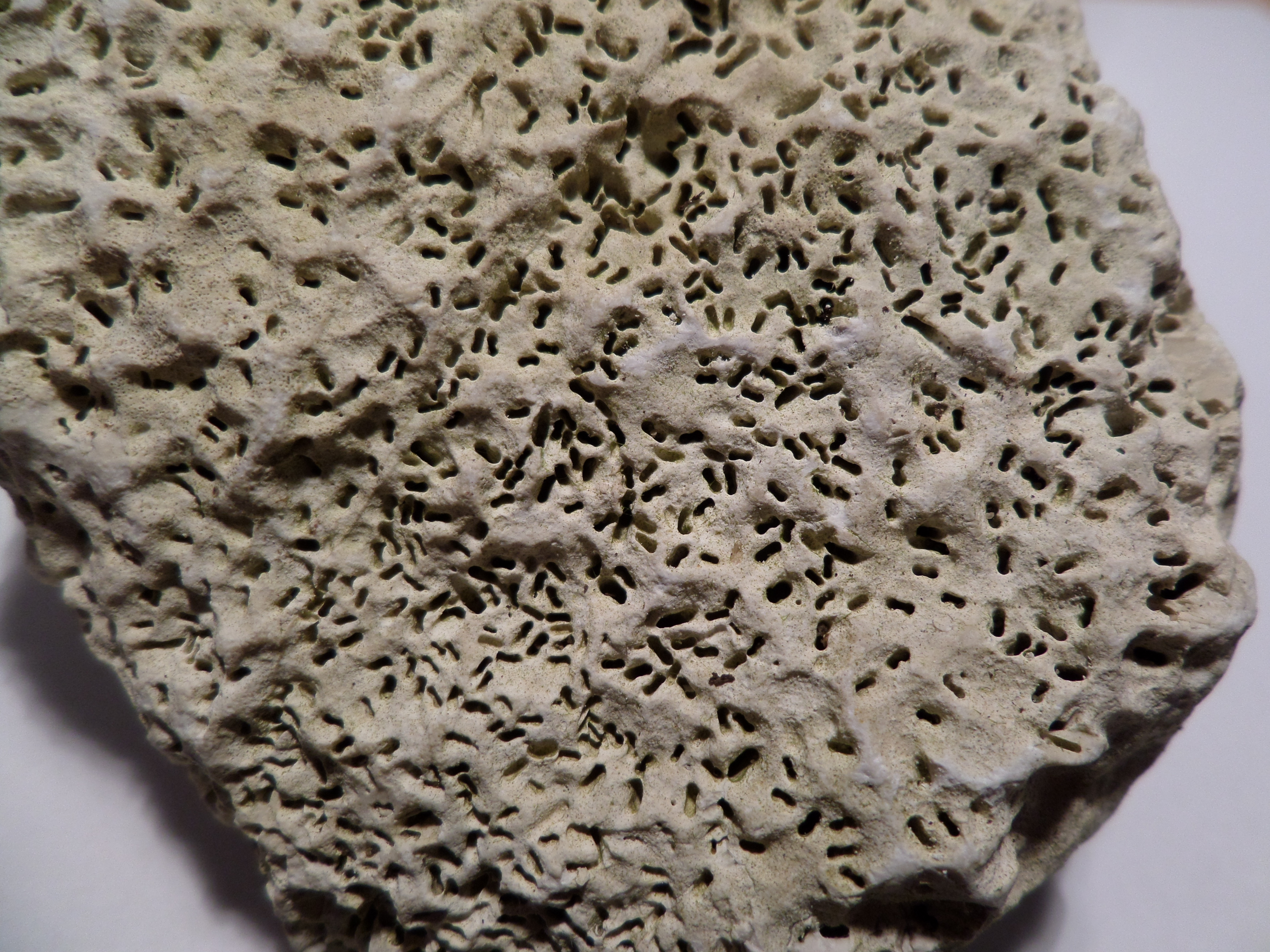
Characteristic double holes left by P. ciliata burrowing into rock.

The burrow of P. ciliata is U-shaped, and the presence of these worms can be recognised by the sets of small, double perforations they make. The worm is believed to burrow by abrading the substrate with its bristly chaetae, but there may also be some chemical action involved in burrowing. The tube is lined with mucus and fine grains of sediment and extends slightly above the surrounding material. When feeding, the worm extends its head out of the tube and uses its two long palps to feed on detritus. It has been observed feeding on dead barnacles and other small dead invertebrates, and can also filter plankton from the water.

The worms are either male or female; sperm is liberated into the water column and drawn into the burrow of the female by means of the respiratory current. Up to 60 eggs are enclosed in a capsule, and several capsules are suspended by threads inside the female's tube. The eggs hatch in about one week and are planktonic for up to six weeks before settling. When the worms bore into the shells of oysters, mussels and periwinkles, they do not feed on the mollusc's soft parts, but they weaken the shell and make the mollusc more vulnerable to attack by crabs and other predators.
