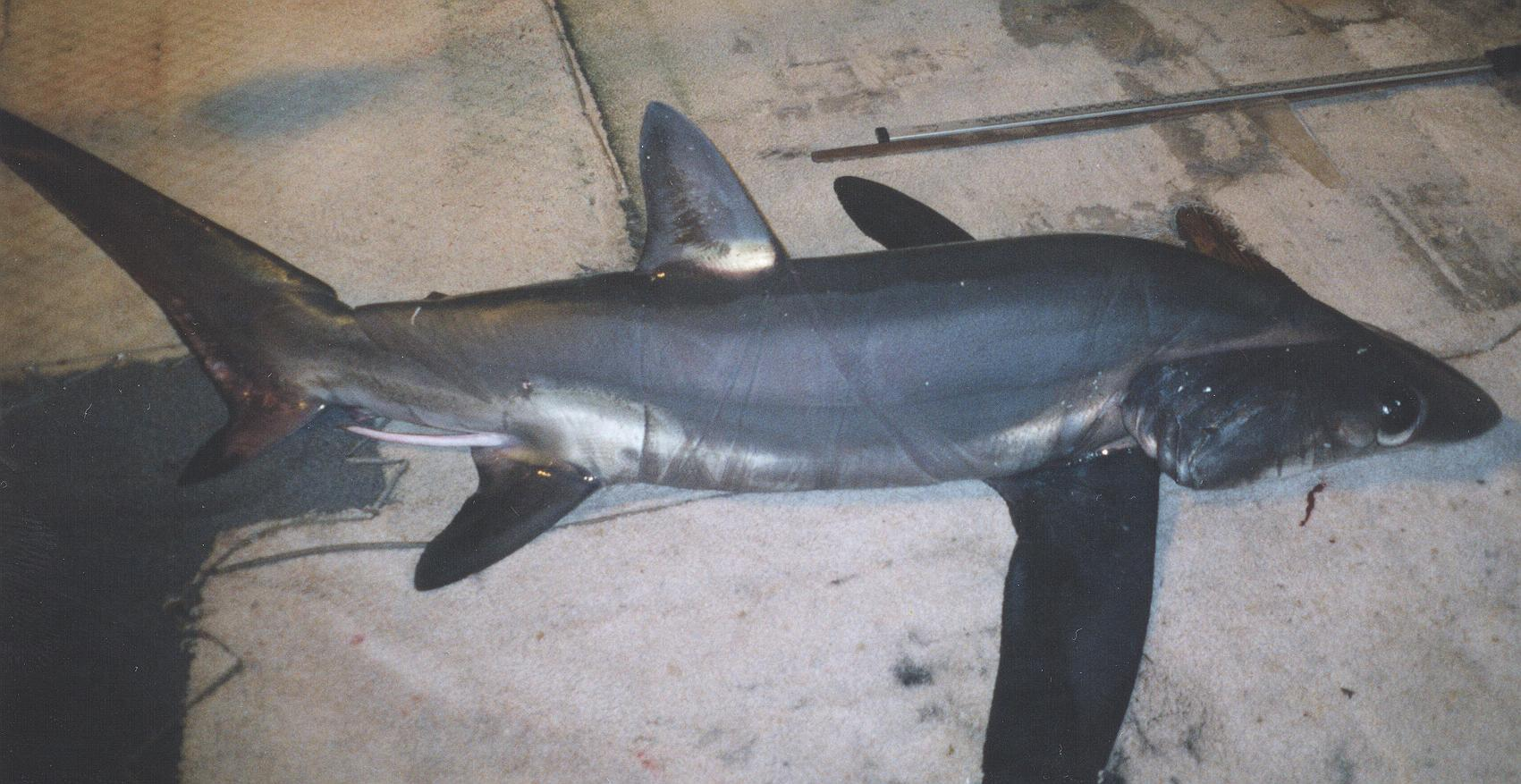

Conservation status
- Vulnerable (IUCN 3.1)
- CITES Appendix II

Scientific classification
- Kingdom: Animalia
- Phylum: Chordata
- Class: Chondrichthyes
- Subclass: Elasmobranchii
- Division: Selachii
- Order: Lamniformes
- Family: Alopiidae
- Genus: Alopias
- Species: A. superciliosus

Binomial name
- Alopias superciliosus (R. T. Lowe, 1840)
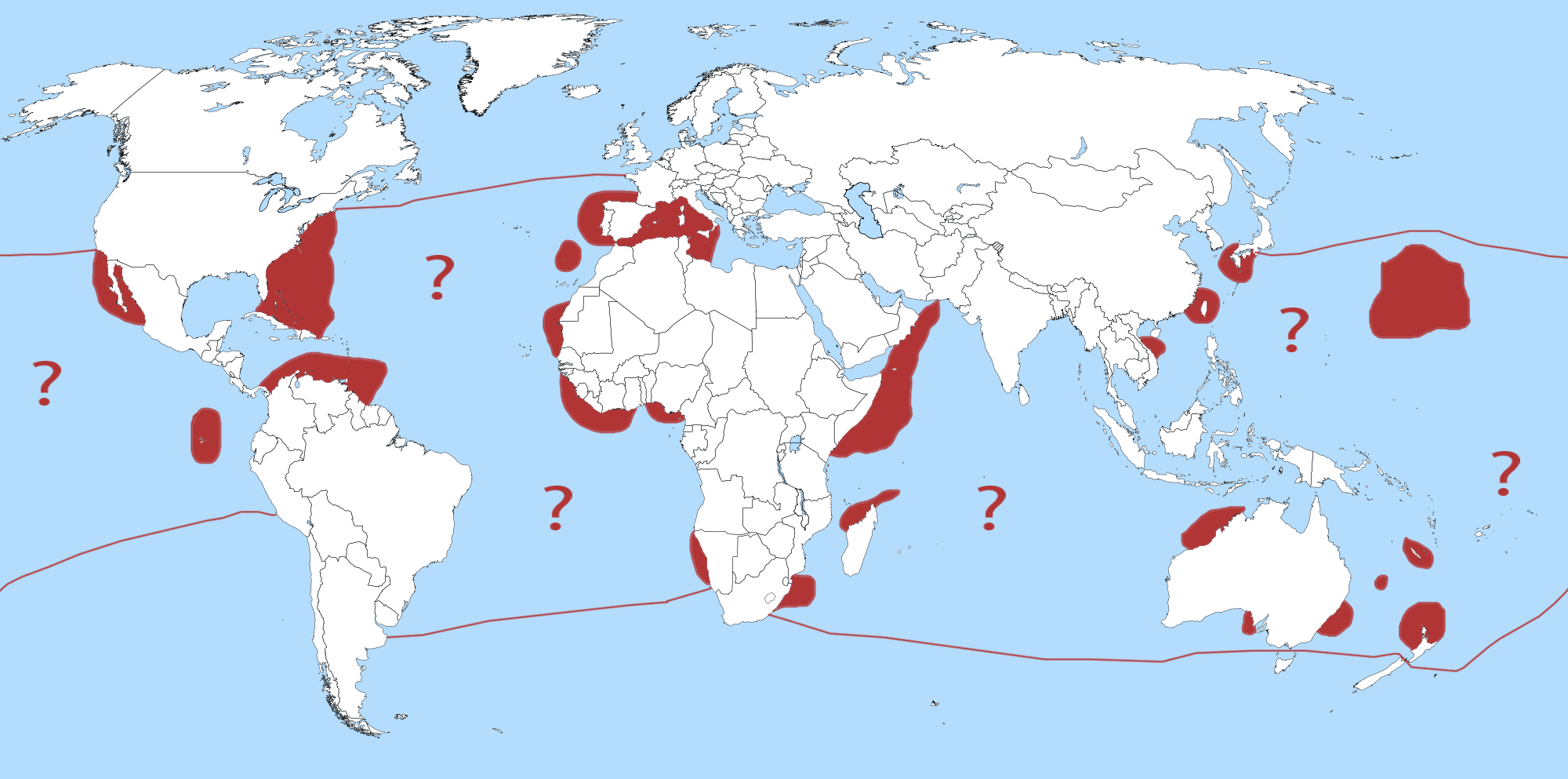
- Range of the bigeye thresher

Synonyms
- Alopecias superciliosus R. T. Lowe, 1840; Alopias profundus Nakamura, 1935

= Bigeye thresher =

Bigeye thresher Temporal range: 16–0 Ma Middle Miocene to Present

Species of shark

The bigeye thresher (Alopias superciliosus) is a species of thresher shark, family Alopiidae, found in temperate and tropical oceans worldwide. Like the other thresher sharks, nearly half its total length consists of the elongated upper lobe of the tail fin. Its common name comes from its enormous eyes, which are placed in keyhole-shaped sockets that allow them to be rotated upward. This species can also be distinguished by a pair of deep grooves on the top of its head, from which its scientific name is derived.

The large eyes of the bigeye thresher are adapted for hunting in low light conditions. It is one of the few sharks that conduct a diel vertical migration, staying in deep water during the day and moving into surface waters at night to feed. To protect its sensitive brain and eyes from the temperature changes accompanying these movements, the bigeye thresher has a vascular exchange system called the rete mirabile around those organs. This species feeds mainly on fish and squid, which are stunned via whip-like strikes of the long tail. Bigeye threshers are ovoviviparous, usually bearing litters of two pups. The embryos are oophagous and feed on ova produced by the mother while inside the uterus. This shark is caught by commercial fisheries across its range; the meat is not highly regarded but the skin, fins, and liver oil are valued. It has been assessed as Vulnerable by the International Union for Conservation of Nature (IUCN).

== Taxonomy and phylogeny ==
British biologist Richard Thomas Lowe was the first to scientifically describe the bigeye thresher, in papers published in Proceedings of the Royal Society of London (1840) and Transactions of the Zoological Society of London (1849, sometimes given as 1839). He based his description on a specimen caught off Madeira in the eastern Atlantic Ocean. However, Lowe's description was subsequently overlooked by researchers and this species was known by different names until the 1940s, when new specimens from Cuba and Florida prompted its original scientific name to be resurrected. The specific epithet superciliosus is from the Latin super meaning "above", and ciliosus meaning "eyebrow", referring to the distinct lateral grooves above the eyes.

An allozyme analysis conducted by Blaise Eitner in 1995 showed that the closest relative of the bigeye thresher is the pelagic thresher (A. pelagicus), with which it forms a clade. Fossil remains of the bigeye thresher dating to the Middle Miocene (16.0–11.6 Ma) have been found in the Hokuriku region of Japan.

== Distribution and habitat ==
The bigeye thresher has a virtually circumtropical distribution. In the western Atlantic Ocean, it has been reported from New York to Florida, the Caribbean, Venezuela, Tobago and southern Brazil. In the eastern Atlantic, it is known from Portugal, Madeira, Senegal, Guinea to Sierra Leone, Angola, and the Mediterranean Sea. In the western Indian Ocean, it occurs off South Africa, Madagascar, and the Arabian Sea. In the Pacific Ocean, it is known from southern Japan, Taiwan, New Caledonia, northwestern Australia, and New Zealand, and eastward to Hawaii, southern California, the Gulf of California, and west of the Galapagos Islands. Analysis of mitochondrial DNA has shown that Atlantic and Indo-Pacific populations are somewhat genetically divergent from each other.

Bigeye threshers are usually found over the continental shelf and in the open sea, though they are occasionally encountered in shallow coastal waters. They occur in surface temperatures of 16–25 °C (61–77 °F), but have been tracked as far down as 723 m (2,372 ft), where the temperature is only 5 °C (41 °F). Little is known of their geographical movements; one individual has been documented moving from New York to the Gulf of Mexico, a straight-line distance of 2,767 km (1,719 mi).

== Description ==
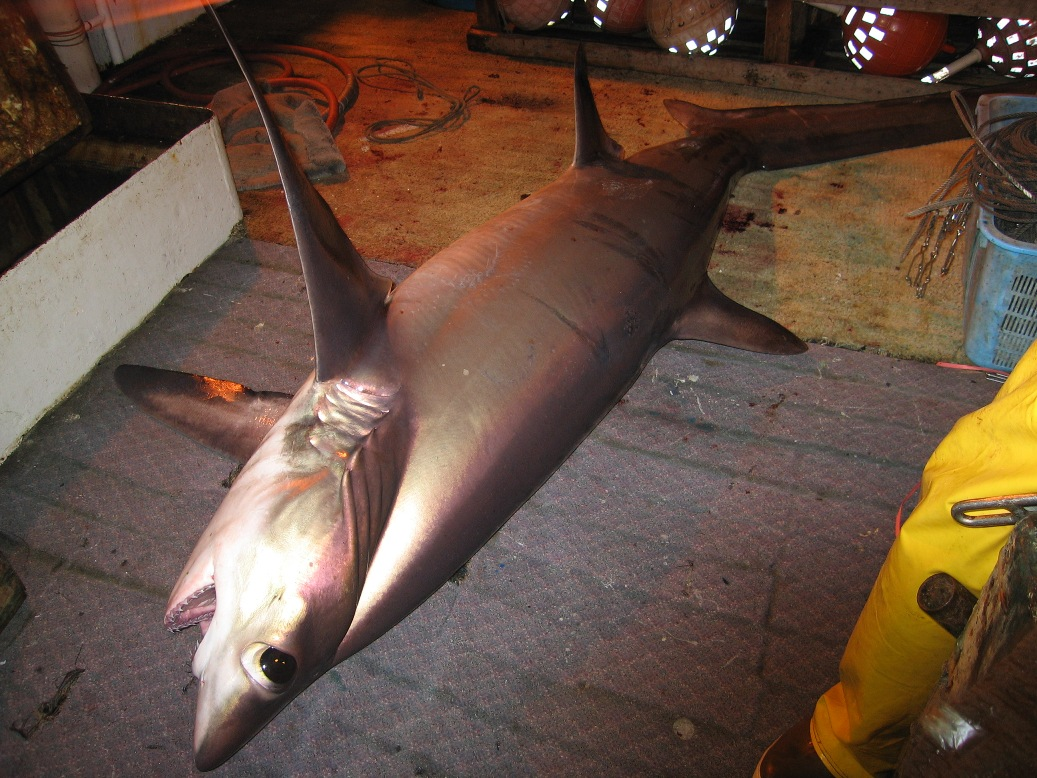
Freshly landed bigeye thresher

The eyes of the bigeye thresher can measure up to 10 cm (3.9 in) across in adults. Each eye is taller than wide, with a bulbous upper portion. The orbits extend onto the dorsal surface of the head, allowing the eyes to orient upwards. There are also a pair of distinctive lateral grooves that extend from above the eyes to over the gill slits, giving it a "helmet"-like appearance. The snout is moderately long and bulbous, and there are no labial furrows at the corners of the mouth. The teeth are moderately large with a single, narrow cusp. There are 19–24 teeth in the upper jaw and 20–24 teeth in the lower jaw; their shapes are similar in both jaws. There are large and small dermal denticles, with the smaller ones more numerous and interspersed amongst the larger ones. The smaller denticles taper to a point.

Up to half the body length is taken up by the long upper lobe of the caudal fin, which is broader than in other threshers. The large pectoral fins have a curved anterior margin and broad tips. The first dorsal fin is placed further back than in the other thresher sharks, with the free rear tip located above or just before the pelvic fins. Its coloration is a deep, metallic violet to purplish brown above and creamy white below. This color rapidly fades to a dull gray after death. Most bigeye threshers are 3.3–4.0 m (10.8–13.1 ft) long and weigh 160 kg (350 lb). The largest known bigeye thresher measured 4.9 m (16 ft) long and weighed 364 kg (802 lb), and was caught near Tutukaka, New Zealand, in February 1981.

== Biology and ecology ==
The size and upward orientation of the bigeye thresher's eyes are adapted to search for the silhouettes of prey in dim light. This species is one of a handful of shark species that conducts a diel vertical migration, spending daytime in deeper water between 300–500 m (980–1,640 ft), beneath the thermocline where the temperature ranges from 6 to 12 °C (43 to 54 °F), and ascending above it to water less than 100 m (330 ft) deep during nighttime. This migration likely relates to finding prey at night and avoiding predators during the day. The sharks' daytime swimming patterns are usually steady, while at night they have a pattern of slow ascents and rapid descents.

Bigeye threshers are likely preyed upon by larger sharks and marine mammals. Known parasites of the bigeye thresher include the copepod Pagina tunica, and the tapeworm Litobothrium janovyi. Sea lampreys (Petromyzon marinus) have been seen attached near the cloaca of this shark. The bigeye thresher appears to be an ecological competitor of the blue shark (Prionace glauca), and the numbers of the two species are negatively correlated such as that only one of two occurs in any given location.

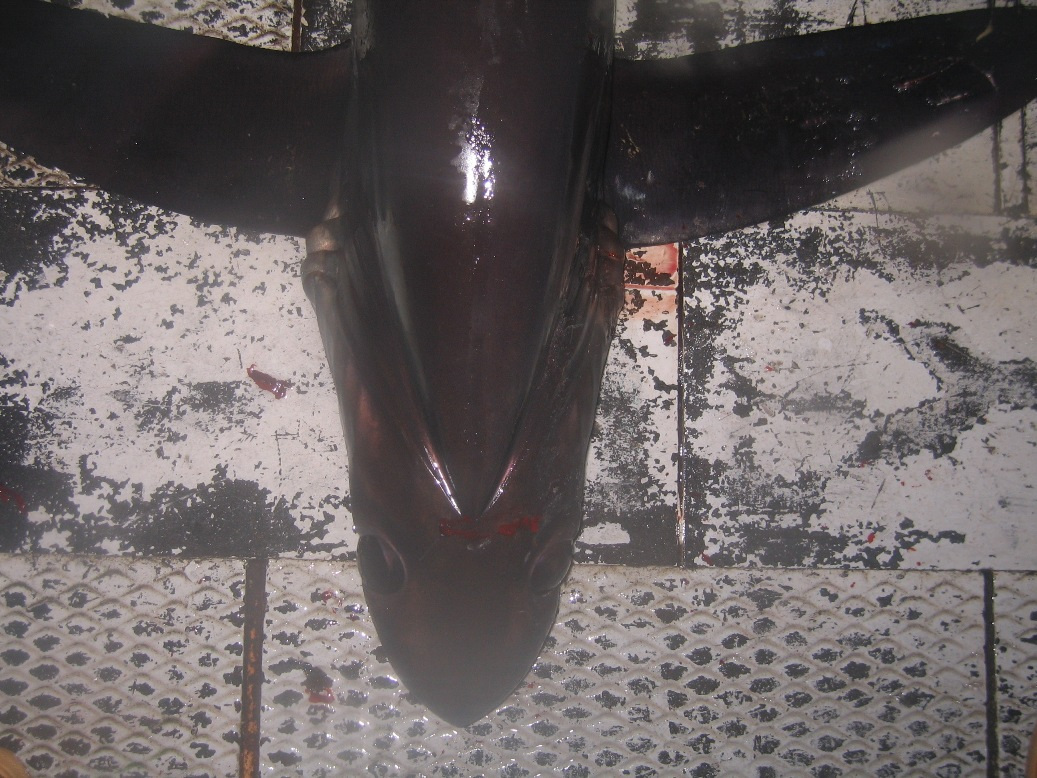
Dorsal view of a bigeye thresher, showing upward-facing eyes and prominent lateral grooves.

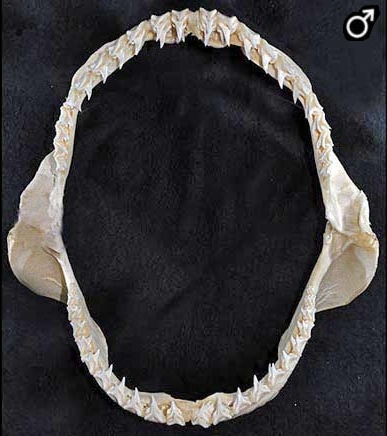
Teeth, male

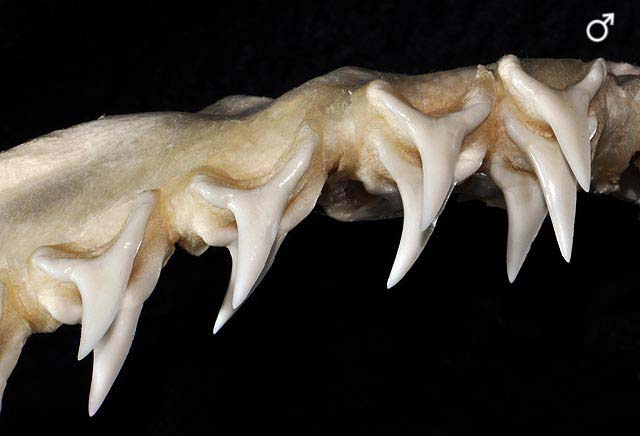
Teeth, male

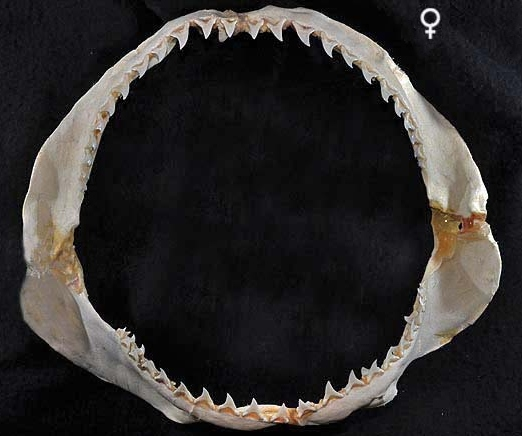
Teeth, female

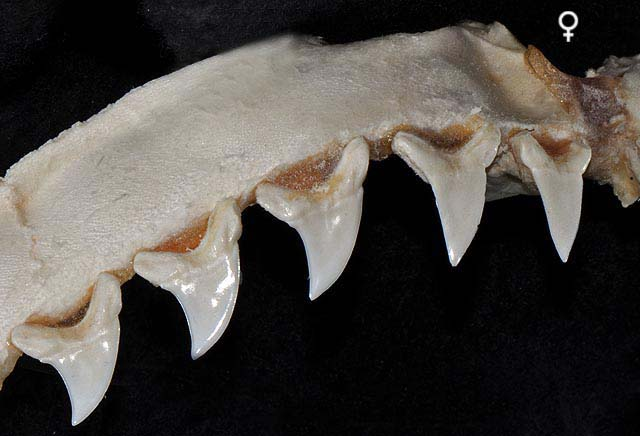
Teeth, female

=== Feeding ===
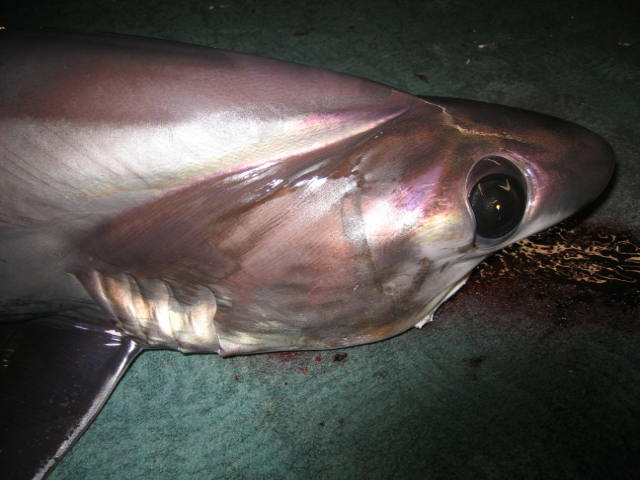
The enormous eyes of the bigeye thresher allow them to hunt in dim light.

The bigeye thresher has larger teeth than other threshers and feeds on a wider variety of prey. Known food items include schooling forage fish such as mackerel and herring, benthic fishes such as hake and whiting, larger pelagic fishes such as lancetfish and small billfish, squid such as lycoteuthids and ommastrephids, and possibly crab megalopae. They likely use their long tails to stun their prey prior to capture, as they are often found hooked by their tails on longlines and with the bait fish in their stomachs. The shape of their eye sockets give them binocular vision in an upward direction to better aim their strikes. In the Mediterranean, they are strongly associated with schools of frigate mackerel (Auxis rochei), suggesting that these sharks follow concentrations of their prey from place to place. It is said that the bigeye thresher uses its long tail to smack down birds.

=== Life history ===
Like other mackerel sharks, bigeye threshers are ovoviviparous and bear litters of two pups, one in each uterus. Very rarely, the litter size may be one, three, or four. There is no defined breeding season and most adult females are pregnant throughout the year without any apparent lag time between pregnancies. The gestation period is unknown. The developing fetuses are initially nourished by a yolk sac, and later on exhibit oophagy, in which they consume infertile eggs produced by their mother (and possibly also uterine fluid). There is no evidence of sibling cannibalism as in the sand tiger shark (Carcharias taurus). Unborn embryos are similar in appearance to adults, with proportionally larger heads and eyes. They are covered with a thin layer of epithelium that prevents the uterine wall from being abraded by the embryo's sharp dermal denticles; this has not been observed in the young of other thresher sharks. The young measure 1.35–1.4 m (4.4–4.6 ft) long at birth. Males mature at a length around 2.7–2.9 m (8.9–9.5 ft) and at an age of 9–10 years, while females mature at a length around 3.3–3.6 m (11–12 ft) and at an age of 12–14 years. The maximum lifespan of this species is believed to be 19 years for a male and 20 years for a female. A female bigeye thresher is estimated to produce only 20 young over her entire life.

=== Thermoregulation ===
There is conflicting evidence on whether the bigeye thresher is warm-bodied like the common thresher (A. vulpinus). In a 1971 study, Carey et al. probed the swimming muscles of two bigeye threshers with a thermistor needle and reported finding a temperature elevation of 1.8 and 4.3 °C (35.2 and 39.7 °F) compared to the ambient environment. However, an anatomical examination conducted by Sepulveda et al. in 2005 found that though the bigeye thresher possesses the aerobic red muscles responsible for generating heat in the common thresher, these muscles are arranged in two strips along the flanks just beneath the skin, as opposed to near the core of the body. There is also no blood vessel countercurrent exchange system (the rete mirabile) in the trunk to limit the loss of metabolic heat to the water. Based on these differences, the authors questioned earlier measurements and concluded it was unlikely that the bigeye thresher maintains an elevated body temperature. The bigeye thresher does possess a highly developed rete system around its brain and eyes. This is thought to function in buffering those sensitive organs against temperature changes during the shark's daily migrations up and down the water column, which can be as much as 15–16 °C (59–61 °F).

== Human interactions ==
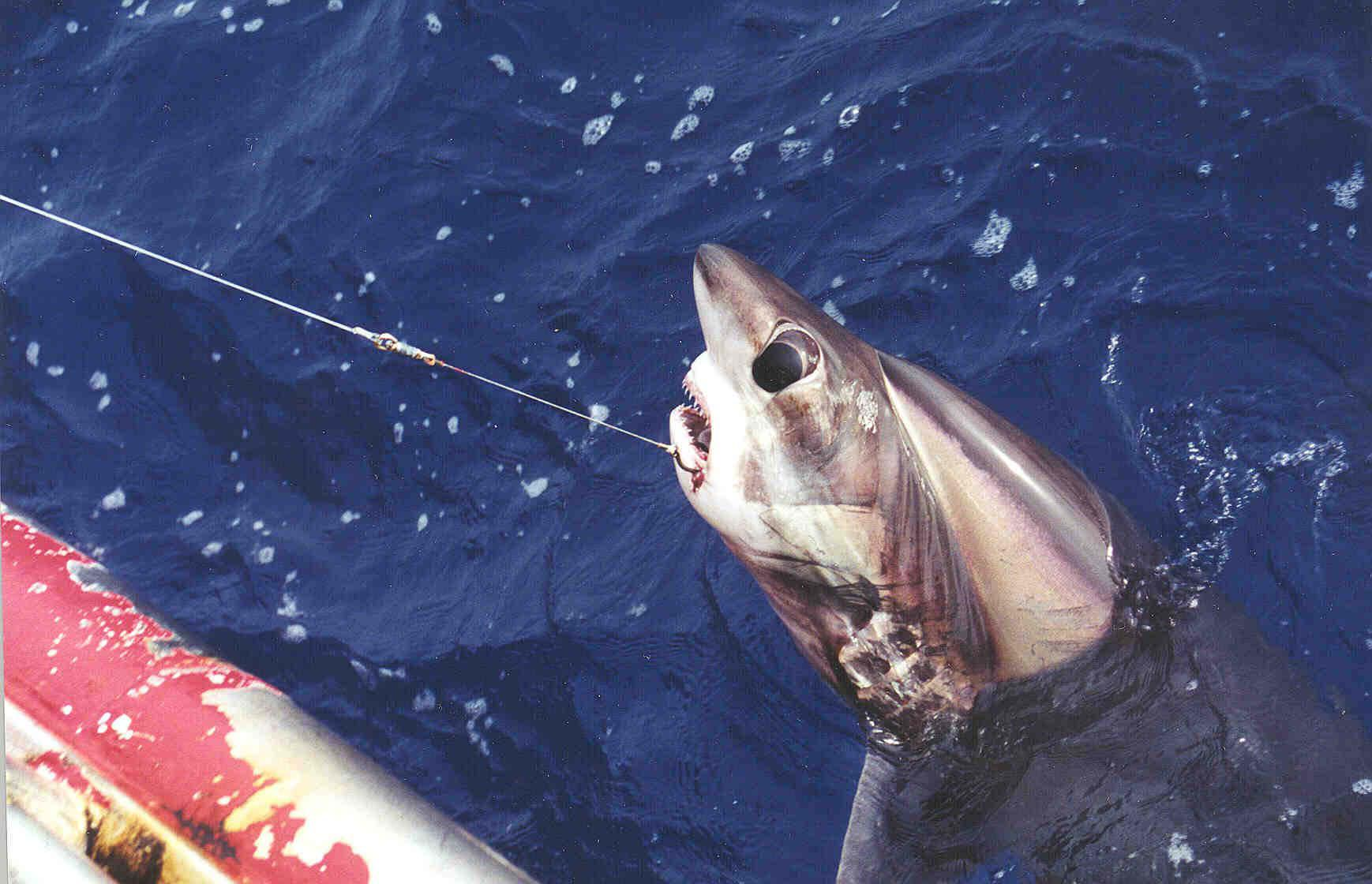
Bigeye threshers are often caught on longlines.

The bigeye thresher shark is rarely encountered by divers underwater and poses no danger. This species is or was taken by longline fisheries operated by many countries, including the United States, Japan, Spain, Brazil, Uruguay, and Mexico, and constitutes about 10% of the pelagic shark catch. The bigeye thresher comprises 20% of the longline catch off Cuba, where it is attracted at night using cyalume sticks (chemical lights). It is also significant to Taiwanese fisheries, which land about 220 metric tons annually. The meat is marketed fresh, smoked, or dried and salted, though it is not highly regarded due to its mushy texture. The skin is used to make leather products, the liver oil for vitamins, and the fins for shark fin soup.

In the waters of the United States, this species is considered a nuisance bycatch of longlines, gillnets, and trawls. It is also occasionally caught in shark nets around beaches in South Africa. Along with the other thresher species, the bigeye thresher is listed as a game fish by the International Game Fish Association (IGFA), and is pursued by recreational anglers off the United States, South Africa, and New Zealand. The bigeye thresher is highly susceptible to over-exploitation due to its low lifetime fecundity. All three thresher shark species were assessed as Vulnerable by the International Union for Conservation of Nature (IUCN) in 2007. In New Zealand, the Department of Conservation has classified the bigeye thresher shark as "Not Threatened" under the New Zealand Threat Classification System.
