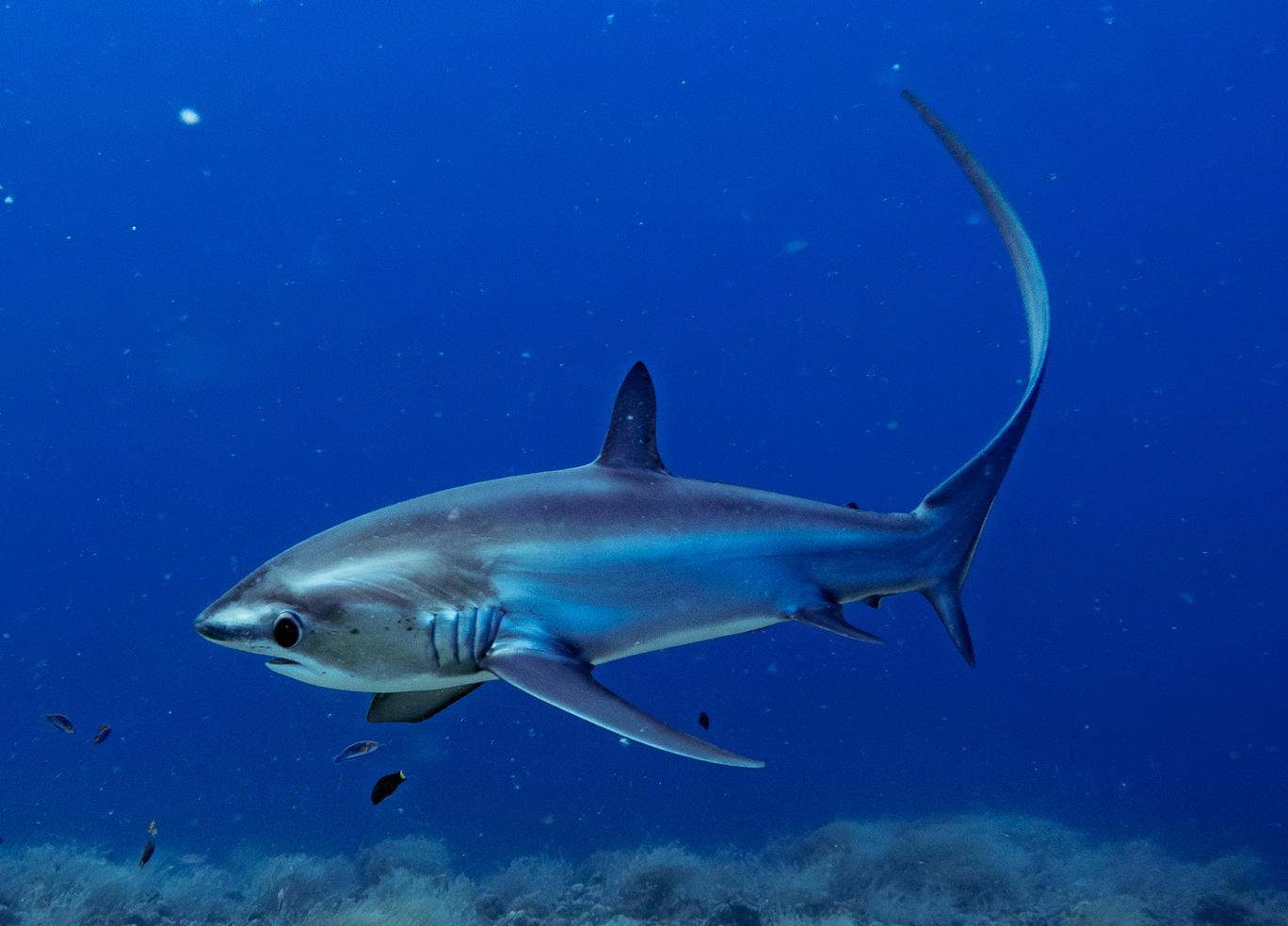
- Pelagic thresher off Tabango, Philippines.

Conservation status
- Endangered (IUCN 3.1)
- CITES Appendix II

Scientific classification
- Kingdom: Animalia
- Phylum: Chordata
- Class: Chondrichthyes
- Subclass: Elasmobranchii
- Division: Selachii
- Order: Lamniformes
- Family: Alopiidae
- Genus: Alopias
- Species: A. pelagicus

Binomial name
- Alopias pelagicus H. Nakamura, 1935
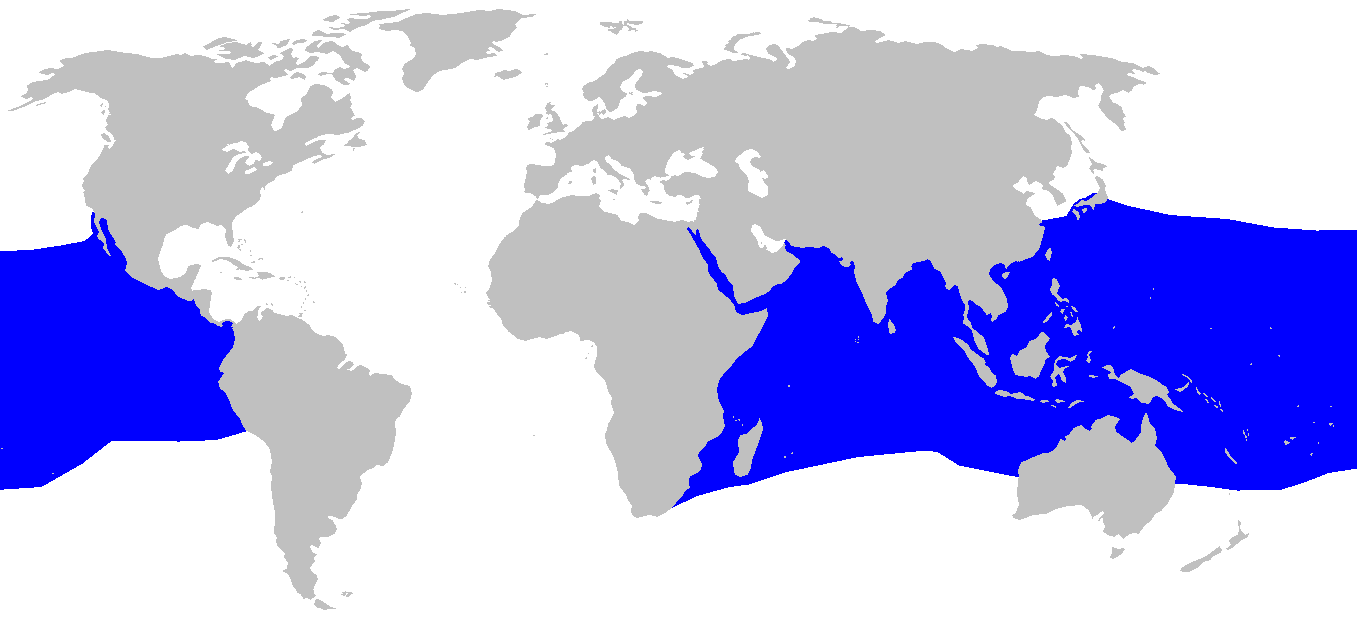
- Geographic range (blue)

= Pelagic thresher =

Species of shark

The pelagic thresher (Alopias pelagicus) is a species of thresher shark, family Alopiidae; this group of sharks is characterized by the greatly elongated upper lobes of their caudal fins. The pelagic thresher occurs in the tropical and subtropical waters of the Indian Ocean and Pacific Ocean, usually far from shore, although they do occasionally enter coastal habitats. Palagic thresher sharks are often confused with the common thresher (A. vulpinus), even in professional publications, but they can be taxonomically distinguished by the dark, rather than white, color over the bases of their pectoral fins. The smallest of the three thresher species, the pelagic thresher typically measures 3 m (9.8 ft) long.

The diet of the pelagic thresher consists mainly of small midwater fishes, which are stunned with whip-like strikes of the palagic thresher's tail. Along with all other mackerel sharks, the pelagic thresher exhibits ovoviviparity and usually gives birth to litters of two. The developing embryos are oophagous, feeding on unfertilized eggs produced by the mother. The young are born unusually large, up to 43% the length of the mother. Pelagic threshers are valued by commercial fisheries for their meat, skin, liver oil, and fins, and are also pursued by sport fishers. The International Union for Conservation of Nature assessed this species as endangered species in 2019.

== Taxonomy and phylogeny ==
The pelagic thresher was originally described by Japanese ichthyologist Hiroshi Nakamura on the basis of three large specimens, none of which was designated a holotype. He illustrated one of the three specimens in his paper, "On the two species of the thresher shark from Formosan waters", published in August 1935. Nakamura also separately illustrated and described a fetus, that Leonard Compagno later concluded was probably of a common thresher. Several authors, including Gohar and Mazhar (1964, Red Sea), Kato, Springer and Wagner (1967, Eastern Pacific), Fourmanoir and Laboute (1976, New Caledonia), Johnson (1978, Tahiti), and Faughnan (1980, Hawaiian Islands) have published illustrations of "common threshers" that were in fact pelagic threshers. The specific epithet pelagicus is from the Greek pelagios, meaning "of the sea". Another common name is the smalltooth thresher.

An allozyme analysis conducted by Blaise Eitner in 1995 showed that the closest relative of the pelagic thresher is the bigeye thresher (A. superciliosus), with which it forms a clade.

== Distribution and habitat ==
Due to confusion with the common thresher, the distribution of the pelagic thresher may be wider than is currently known. It ranges extensively in the Indo-Pacific, with scattered records from South Africa, the Red Sea, and the Arabian Sea (off Somalia, between Oman and India, and off Pakistan), to China, southeastern Japan, northwestern Australia, New Caledonia, and Tahiti, to the Hawaiian Islands, California, and the Galapagos Islands. The North Pacific population shifts northward during warm El Nino years. Analysis of mitochondrial DNA has shown extensive gene flow within the eastern and western Pacific pelagic thresher populations, but little flow between them.

The pelagic thresher primarily inhabits the open ocean, occurring from the surface to a depth of at least 150 m (490 ft). However, it occasionally comes close to shore in regions with a narrow continental shelf, and has been observed near coral reef dropoffs or seamounts in the Red Sea and the Gulf of California, and off Indonesia and Micronesia. It has also been known to enter large lagoons in the Tuamotu Islands.

== Description ==
The pelagic thresher is the smallest of the thresher sharks, typically 3 m (10 ft) in length and 69.5 kg (153.2 lb) in weight, and usually not exceeding 3.3 m (11 ft) and 88.4 kg (195 lb). Males and females attain known maximum lengths of 3.5 m (11 ft) and 3.8 m (12 ft), respectively. A record of 5 m (16 ft) is dubious and may have resulted from confusion with other thresher species. This species has a fusiform body (wide in the middle and tapered at the ends) and a very slender upper caudal fin lobe nearly as long as the rest of the shark. The pectoral fins are long and straight with broad, rounded tips. The first dorsal fin is placed halfway between the pectoral and pelvic fins, and is of comparable size to the pelvic fins. The second dorsal and anal fins are tiny.

The head is narrow with a short, conical snout and a distinctive "pinched" profile when viewed from below. The eyes are very large in juveniles and decrease in relative size with age. No furrows occur at the corners of the mouth. The teeth are very small, numbering 21–22 rows on each side with a symphysial (central) row in the upper jaw and 21 on each side without a symphysial row in the lower jaw. Five to 11 rows of posterior teeth are present. The teeth are smooth-edged, with oblique cusps and lateral cusplets on the outside margins. The body is covered with very small, smooth dermal denticles with flat crowns and cusps with parallel ridges. The coloration is an intense dark blue above and white below; the white does not extend to above the pectoral fins. The color rapidly fades to gray after death. The dark pigment above the pectoral fins, the rounded pectoral fin tips, and the absence of labial furrows separate this shark from the common thresher.

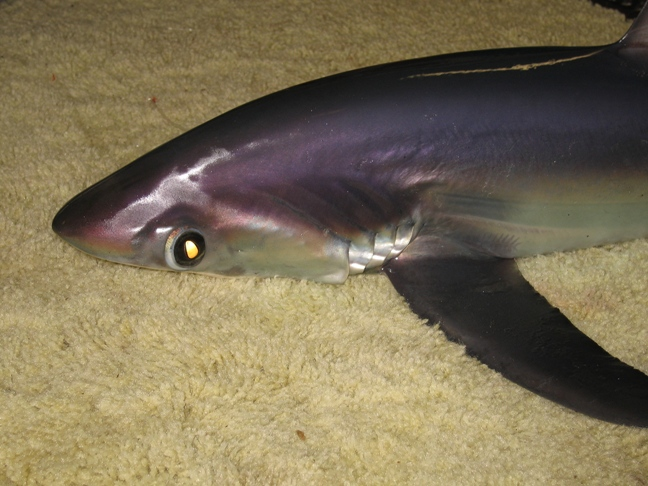
Pelagic threshers can be identified by the color above their pectoral fins

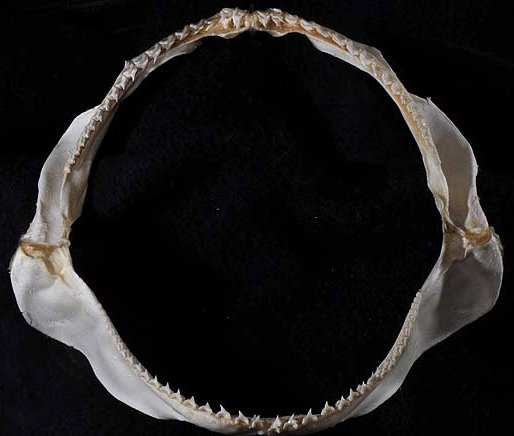
Jaws

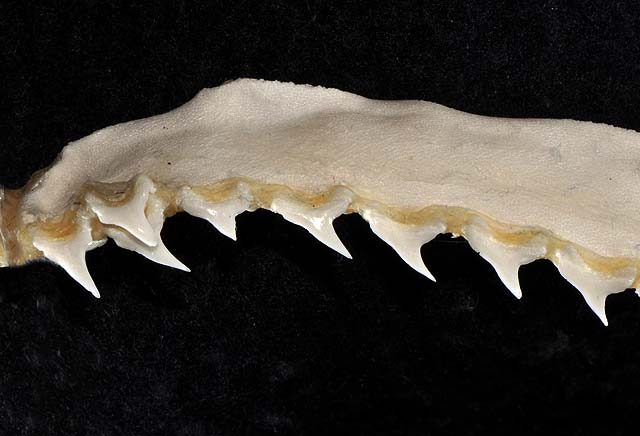
Teeth

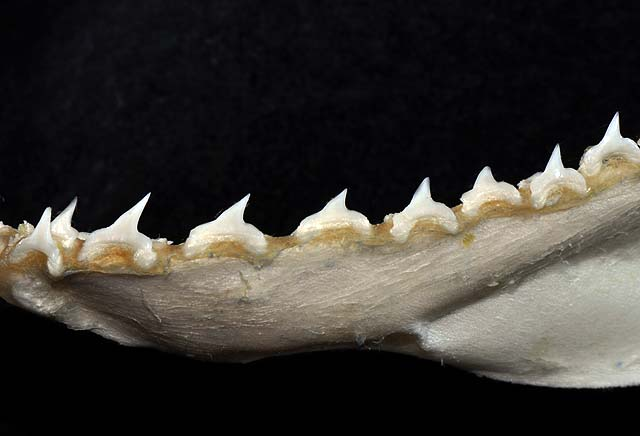
Teeth

== Biology and ecology ==
A male pelagic thresher being attended by cleaner fish

A pelagic thresher using tail slaps to hunt sardines

The pelagic thresher is an active, strong swimmer and has been known to leap clear of the water (five times in a row on one documented occasion). Predators of the pelagic thresher include larger fishes (including other sharks) and toothed whales. Known parasites of this species include the tapeworms Litobothrium amplifica, L. daileyi, and L. nickoli, which inhabit the shark's spiral valve intestine, copepods of the genus Echthrogaleus, which infest the skin, and digeneans of the genus Paronatrema which are found in the cloacal region. At Malapascua Island in the Philippines, pelagic threshers have been observed regularly visiting cleaning stations occupied by cleaner wrasses (Labroides dimidiatus and Thalassoma lunare), during which they exhibit characteristic behaviours to facilitate the cleaning interaction such as slow circular swimming close to the sea-floor. These visits occur more frequently early in the morning, and may be why these normally oceanic sharks are sometimes encountered in shallow water. Cleaner fish feed most frequently in the pelvic and caudal fin (tail) regions of the visiting sharks, potentially due to the parasitic digeneans present in the cloaca, and the damage to the skin of the caudal fin caused by their tail-slap hunting strategy.

=== Feeding ===
Little information is available on the feeding ecology of the pelagic thresher. Its very slender tail and fine dentition suggest an exclusive diet of small, pelagic prey. Analysis of stomach contents reveals that pelagic threshers feed mainly on barracudinas, lightfishes, and escolars, all inhabitants of the mesopelagic zone. Therefore, little competition occurs between the pelagic thresher and other large oceanic piscivores such as billfishes, tunas, and dolphinfishes, which tend to feed near the surface. Pelagic threshers have been shown to stun their prey by striking them sharply with the upper lobe of their caudal fins allowing them to consume more than one prey item at one time. Because of this behaviour, pelagic threshers are often hooked on longlines by their tails.

=== Life history ===
Like the rest of the mackerel sharks, the pelagic thresher is ovoviviparous. It gives birth to two pups at a time (rarely just one), one per uterus. With no defined breeding season, most adult females are pregnant throughout the year; the gestation period is uncertain, but has been suggested to be less than one year as in the common thresher. The developing embryos are sustained by a yolk sac until they are 12 cm (4.7 in) long, after which they are oophagous and feed on egg capsules produced by the mother. Each capsule measures about 55 mm (2.2 in) long and 12 mm (0.47 in) across, and contains 20–30 ova. Early-stage embryos have specialized teeth for opening the capsules, while later-stage embryos have their teeth hidden and swallow the capsules whole, their teeth not becoming functional again until just after birth. No evidence of sibling cannibalism has been found as in the sand tiger shark (Carcharias taurus). Young pelagic threshers are born unusually large, up to 1.6 m (5 ft 3 in) long or 43% the length of the mother, which likely reduces predation on the newborns.

The growth rate of pelagic threshers slows with age:

- 9 cm (3.5 in)/year for ages 0–1,
- 8 cm (3.1 in)/year for ages 2–3,
- 6 cm (2.4 in)/year for ages 5–6,
- 4 cm (1.6 in)/year for ages 7–10,
- 3 cm (1.2 in)/year for ages 10–12,
- and 2 cm (0.79 in)/year for ages 13 and greater.

Females reach maturity at 2.8–2.9 m (9 ft 2 in – 9 ft 6 in) long and eight to nine years old, while males mature at 2.7–2.8 m (8 ft 10 in – 9 ft 2 in) long and seven to eight years old. The oldest confirmed ages for females and males are 16 and 14 years, respectively. Extrapolating the growth curves to the largest known individuals suggests that females may have a lifespan exceeding 28 years, and males 17 years. A single female produces about 40 young over her entire life.

=== Thermoregulation ===
Anatomical examination indicates that the pelagic thresher is unlikely to be warm-bodied like the common thresher; it lacks a rete mirabile, a blood vessel countercurrent exchange system that prevents metabolic heat from being dissipated into the water, inside its trunk. Furthermore, its aerobic red muscles, responsible for generating heat in the common thresher, are positioned in two lateral strips just beneath the skin rather than at the core of the body. A rete system is present around the pelagic thresher's brain and eyes, albeit less developed than in the bigeye thresher, which may serve to buffer those organs against temperature changes.

== Relation to humans ==
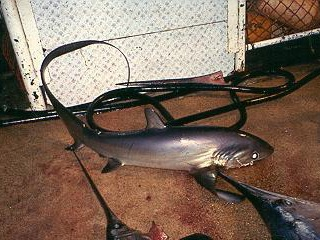
Pelagic threshers are often caught as bycatch on longlines.

The pelagic thresher has never been implicated in an attack on humans; it has small jaws and teeth for its size and tends to flee from divers. This shark is taken by commercial fisheries in the central Pacific and western Indian Oceans, as well as off California and Mexico. Abundant off northeastern Taiwan, it comprises over 12% (about 3,100 sharks, 220 metric tons) of the annual Taiwanese shark landings. The meat is sold for human consumption, the skin is made into leather, and the fins are used for shark fin soup in Asia. The liver oil of the pelagic thresher can comprise 10% of its weight, and is used in the manufacture of cosmetics, health foods, and high-grade machine oil.

Though rarely caught, pelagic threshers are also valued by sport fishers and are listed as game fish by the International Game Fish Association. The largest overall records are from New Zealand, while the light tackle records are from California. Pelagic threshers are frequently taken as bycatch on longlines and in driftnets meant for other species such as tuna, and also rarely in gillnets and antishark nets.
