= Polydora glycymerica =

Scientific classification
- Domain: Eukaryota
- Kingdom: Animalia
- Phylum: Annelida
- Clade: Pleistoannelida
- Clade: Sedentaria
- Order: Spionida
- Family: Spionidae
- Genus: Polydora
- Species: P. glycymerica

Binomial name
- Polydora glycymerica Radashevsky, 1993

Species of annelid worm

Polydora glycymerica is a species of annelid worm in the family Spionidae, native to the northwestern Pacific Ocean, where it lives commensally in association with a bivalve mollusc, usually Glycymeris yessoensis but occasionally with another species of clam. The worm intercepts food particles being drawn into the mollusc by its feeding current.

== Taxonomy ==
This species was first described in 1993 by the Russian marine biologist Vasily I. Radashevsky, who placed it in the genus Polydora and gave it the specific epithet "glycymerica" because of its commensal relationship with the bivalve Glycymeris yessoensis. The new species resembled Polydora vulgaris, a worm from the South China Sea that is also associated with bivalve molluscs, although in this instance, Pinctada margaritifera and Hyotissa hyotis are the hosts. Researchers used starch gel electrophoresis to compare the number of isozyme loci and the allozymic variation present in both species, and the results suggest that the two are valid, separate species.

== Description ==
This worm grows to a length of about 60 mm (2.4 in) for a 250 segment worm, and is a greenish-brown colour. The prostomium has an incision that is bent down at the front, but no eyes are present in adult worms. The fifth body segment is larger than its neighbours and the seventh has a pair of white, glandular spots ventrally. There are palps on the first eight segments.

== Distribution and habitat ==
Polydora glycymerica is found in the Sea of Japan where it lives commensally on the seabed, boring into the shells of bivalve molluscs such as Glycymeris yessoensis.

== Ecology ==
Polydora glycymerica is an obligate commensal of a bivalve mollusc, boring into its shell. It is nearly always associated with Glycymeris yessoensis, but has also been found living in association with the ark clam Anadara broughtonii. Sometimes several worms occupy one host, with up to six per valve, and a maximum of eight per mollusc. The burrows made by the worms are U-shaped and are located near the posterior end of the mollusc shell, close to the siphons. The worm extends its anterior end from the burrow, intercepting food particles in the feeding current created by the mollusc. The boring activities of the worm may weaken the mollusc shell, perhaps making it more vulnerable to damage or predation. However the worm may also be of benefit to the mollusc as it may be able to handle particles that are too large for the mollusc to deal with, thus preventing the inflow siphon of the mollusc from getting clogged.
