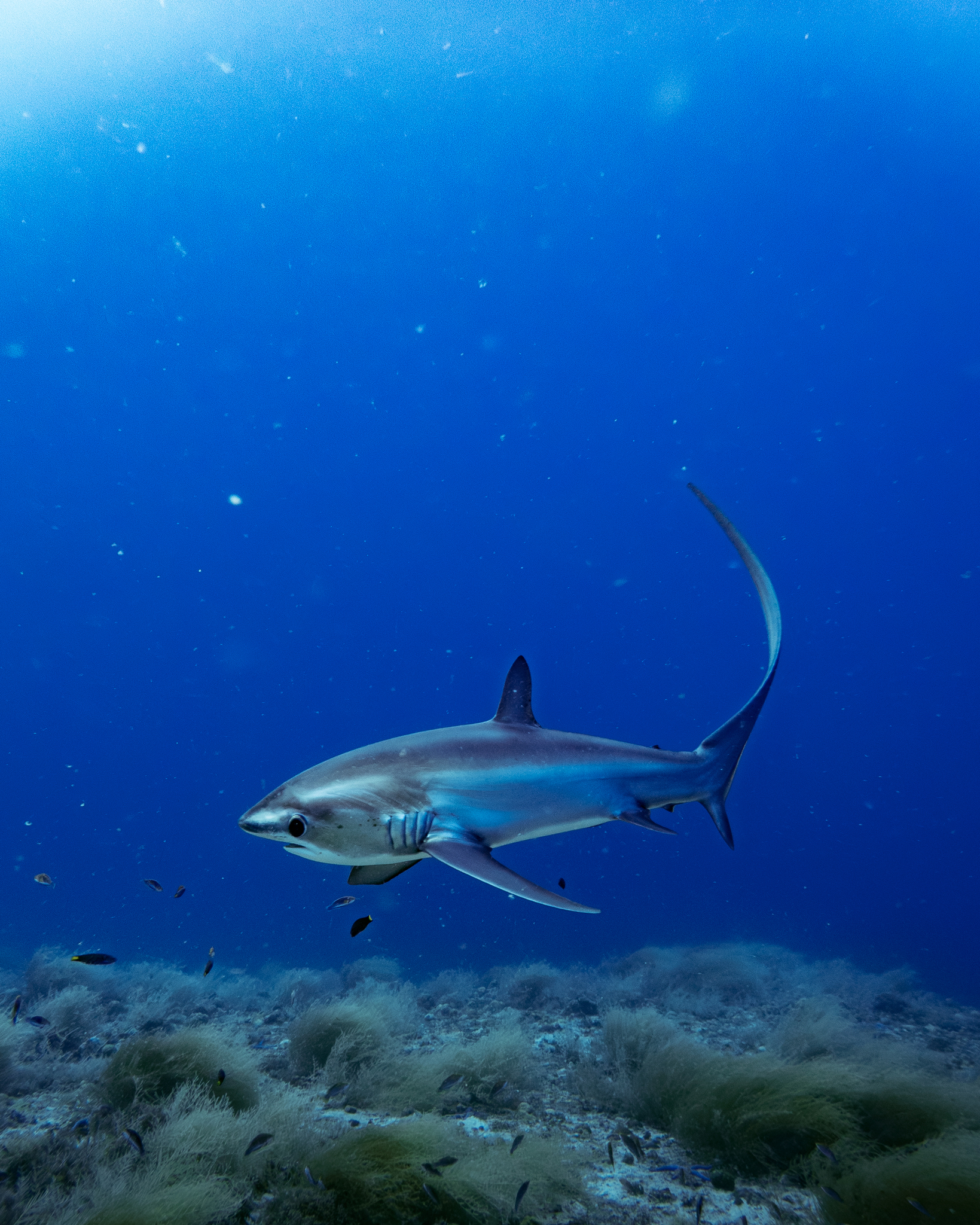
- Pelagic thresher (A. pelagicus)

Scientific classification
- Kingdom: Animalia
- Phylum: Chordata
- Class: Chondrichthyes
- Subclass: Elasmobranchii
- Division: Selachii
- Order: Lamniformes
- Family: Alopiidae
- Genus: Alopias; Rafinesque, 1810

Type species
- Squalus vulpinus Bonnaterre, 1788

Synonyms
- Alopecias Müller and Henle, 1837; Alopius Swainson, 1838; Vulpecula Jarocki, 1822

= Thresher shark =

Thresher shark Temporal range: 49–0 Ma Lutetian to Recent

Genus of fishes (Alopias, family Alopiidae)

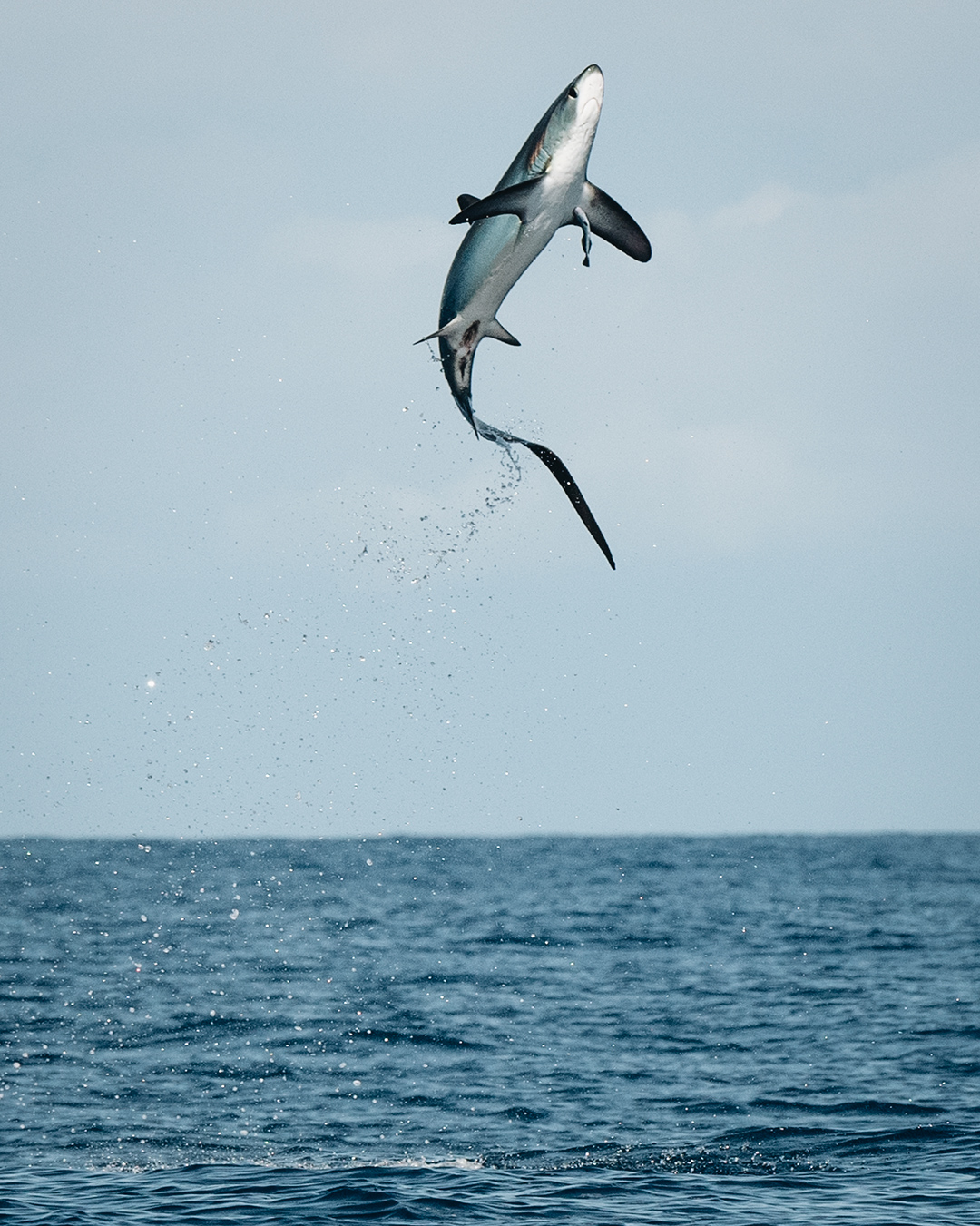
Pelagic thresher (A. pelagicus) jumping in Costa Rica

Thresher sharks are large mackerel sharks of the family Alopiidae found in all temperate and tropical oceans of the world; the Alopiidae family contains three species, all within the genus Alopias.

All three thresher shark species have been listed as vulnerable species by the World Conservation Union since 2007 (IUCN). All three are popular big-game fishing sport fish, and additionally they are hunted by commercial fishers for their shark meat, livers (for shark liver oil), rawhide (shark skin) (for shagreen) and shark fins (for use in delicacies such as shark-fin soup).

Despite being active predatory fish, thresher sharks do not appear to be a threat to humans.

== Taxonomy ==
The genus and family name derive from the Greek word ἀλώπηξ, alṓpēx, meaning fox. As a result, the long-tailed or common thresher shark, Alopias vulpinus, is also known as the fox shark. The common name is derived from a distinctive, scythe-like tail or caudal fin which can be as long as the body of the shark itself.

=== Species ===
The three extant thresher shark species are all in the genus Alopias. The possible existence of a hitherto unrecognized fourth species was revealed during the course of a 1995 allozyme analysis by Blaise Eitner. This species is apparently found in the eastern Pacific off Baja California, and has previously been misidentified as the bigeye thresher. So far, it is only known from muscle samples from one specimen, and no aspect of its morphology has been documented.

- Alopias pelagicus H. Nakamura, 1935 (pelagic thresher)
- Alopias superciliosus R. T. Lowe, 1841 (bigeye thresher)
- Alopias vulpinus Bonnaterre, 1788 (common thresher)
- †Alopias acutidens Casier, 1958
- †Alopias alabamensis White, 1956
- †Alopias carolinensis White, 1956
- †Alopias crochardi Ward, 1978
- †Alopias denticulatus Cappetta, 1981
- †Alopias exigua Probst, 1879
- †Alopias hassei Noetling, 1885
- †Alopias hermani Kozlov, 1999
- †Alopias latidens Leriche, 1909
- †Alopias leeensis Ward, 1978
- †Alopias grandis Leriche, 1942 (giant thresher)
- †Alopias palatasi Kent & Ward, 2018 (serrated giant thresher)
- †Alopias subexigua Dartevelle & Casier, 1959

== Phylogeny and evolution ==
- - Megachasmidae
  - - Alopiidae
      - A. vulpinus
      - - undescribed Alopias sp.
        - - A. superciliosus
          - A. pelagicus
    - - Cetorhinidae
      - Lamnidae

Phylogeny of Alopiidae

Based on cytochrome b genes, Martin and Naylor (1997) concluded the thresher sharks form a monophyletic sister group to the clade containing the families Cetorhinidae (basking shark) and Lamnidae (mackerel sharks). The megamouth shark (Megachasma pelagios) was placed as the next-closest relative to these taxa, though the phylogenetic position of that species has yet to be resolved with confidence. Cladistic analyses by Compagno (1991) based on morphological characters, and Shimada (2005) based on dentition, have both corroborated this interpretation.

Within the family, an analysis of allozyme variation by Eitner (1995) found the common thresher is the most basal member, with a sister relationship to a group containing the unrecognized fourth Alopias species and a clade comprising the bigeye and pelagic threshers. However, the position of the undescribed fourth species was only based on a single synapomorphy (derived group-defining character) in one specimen, so some uncertainty in its placement remains.

== Distribution and habitat ==
Although occasionally sighted in shallow, inshore waters, thresher sharks are primarily pelagic; they prefer the open ocean, characteristically preferring water 550 metres (1,800 ft) and less. Common threshers tend to be more prevalent in coastal waters over continental shelves. Common thresher sharks are found along the continental shelves of North America and Asia of the North Pacific, but are rare in the Central and Western Pacific. In the warmer waters of the Central and Western Pacific, bigeye and pelagic thresher sharks are more common. A thresher shark was seen on the live video feed from one of the ROVs monitoring BP's Macondo oil well blowout in the Gulf of Mexico. This is significantly deeper than the 500 m (1,600 ft) previously thought to be their limit. A bigeye has also been found in the western Mediterranean, and so distribution may be wider than previously believed, or environmental factors may be forcing sharks to search for new territories.

== Anatomy and appearance ==
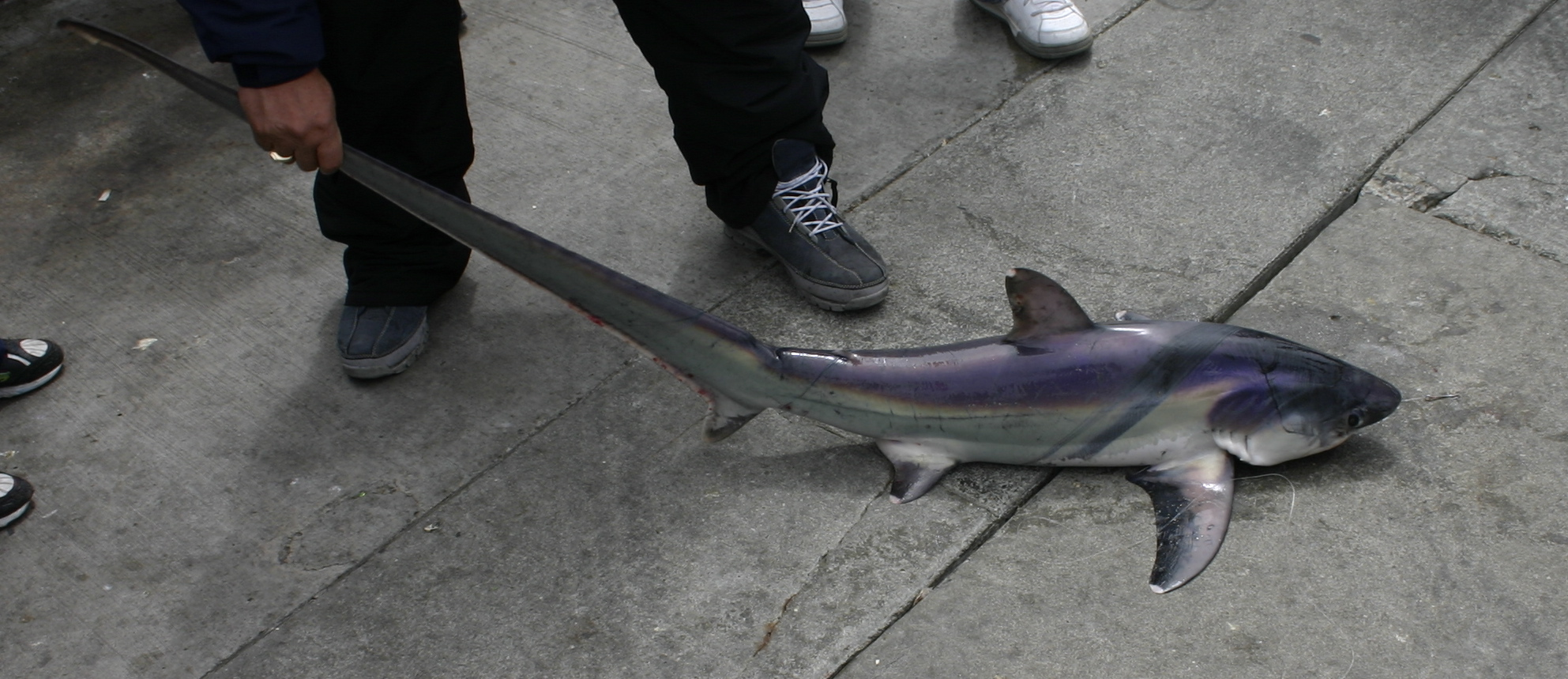
Small common thresher (A. vulpinus) caught at Pacifica Pier, California

Named for their exceptionally long, thresher-like heterocercal tail or caudal fins (which can be as long as two thirds of the total body length), thresher sharks are active predators; the tail is used as a weapon to stun prey. The thresher shark has a short head and a cone-shaped nose. The mouth is generally small, and the teeth range in size from small to large. By far the largest of the three species is the common thresher, Alopias vulpinus, which may reach a length of 6.1 metres (20 ft) and a mass of over 500 kilograms (1,100 lb). The bigeye thresher, A. superciliosus, is next in size, reaching a length of 4.9 m (16 ft); at just 3 m (10 ft), the pelagic thresher, A. pelagicus, is the smallest.

Thresher sharks are fairly slender, with small dorsal fins and large, recurved pectoral fins. With the exception of the bigeye thresher, these sharks have relatively small eyes positioned to the forward of the head. Coloration ranges from brownish, bluish or purplish gray dorsally with lighter shades ventrally. The three species can be roughly distinguished by the primary color of the dorsal surface of the body. Common threshers are dark green, bigeye threshers are brown and pelagic threshers are generally blue. Lighting conditions and water clarity can affect how any one shark appears to an observer, but the color test is generally supported when other features are examined.

== Diet ==
The thresher shark mainly feeds on schooling pelagic fish such as bluefish, juvenile tuna and mackerel, which they are known to follow into shallow waters, as well as squid and cuttlefish. Crustaceans and occasionally seabirds are also eaten. The thresher shark stuns its prey by using its elongated tail as a whipping weapon.

== Behavior ==
External videos
- Stunning tail: Thresher sharks evolved to slap and kill their prey – NBC News
- Thresher Shark Stun Prey With Tail-Slap – Live Science

Thresher sharks are solitary creatures that keep to themselves. It is known that thresher populations of the Indian Ocean are separated by depth and space according to sex. Some species however do occasionally hunt in a group of two or three contrary to their solitary nature. All species are noted for their highly migratory and oceanodromous habits. When hunting schooling fish, thresher sharks are known to "whip" the water. The elongated tail is used to swat smaller fish, stunning them before feeding. Thresher sharks are one of the few shark species known to jump fully out of the water, using their elongated tail to propel them out of the water, making turns like dolphins; this behavior is called breaching.

== Endothermy ==
Two species of the thresher have been identified as having a modified circulatory system that acts as a counter-current heat exchanger, which allows them to retain metabolic heat. Mackerel sharks (family Lamnidae) have a similar homologous structure to this which is more extensively developed. This structure is a strip of red muscle along each of its flanks, which has a tight network of blood vessels that transfer metabolic heat inward towards the core of the shark, allowing it to maintain and regulate its body heat.

== Reproduction ==
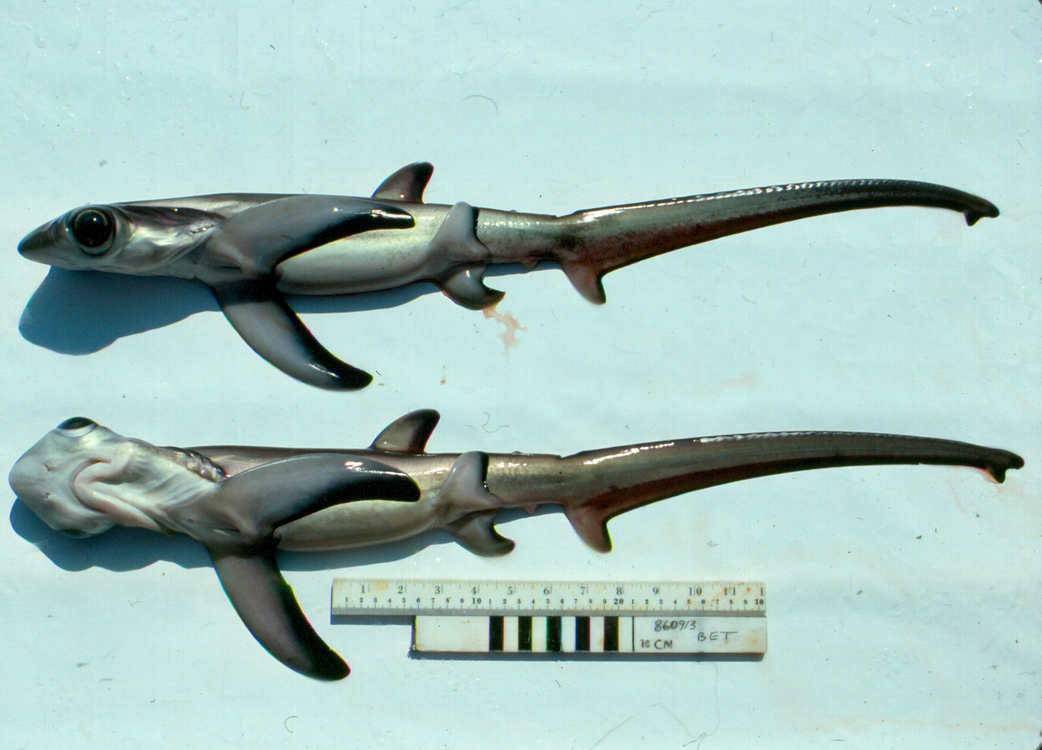
Bigeye thresher (A. superciliosus) embryos

No distinct breeding season is observed by thresher sharks. Fertilization and embryonic development occur internally; this ovoviviparous or live-bearing mode of reproduction results in a small litter (usually two to four) of large well-developed pups, up to 150 cm (59 in) at birth in thintail threshers. The young fish exhaust their yolk sacs while still inside the mother, at which time they begin feasting on the mother's unfertilized eggs; this is known as oophagy.

Thresher sharks are slow to mature; males reach sexual maturity between seven and thirteen years of age and females between eight and fourteen years in bigeye threshers. They may live for 20 years or more.

In October 2013, the first picture of a thresher shark giving birth was taken off the coast of the Philippines.

== Fisheries ==
Thresher sharks are classified as a popular game fish in the United States and South Africa. Common thresher sharks are the target of a popular recreational fishery off Baja, Mexico.

== Status ==
Because of their low fecundity, thresher sharks are highly vulnerable to overfishing. All three thresher shark species have been listed as vulnerable to extinction by the World Conservation Union since 2007 (IUCN).

== See also ==
- Shark meat
