= List of parasites of the common thresher =

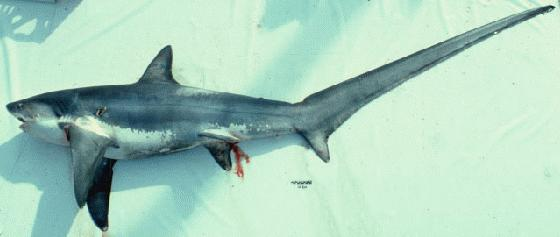
Common thresher shark

The common thresher (Alopias vulpinus) can harbor a number of internal and external parasites:

Type	Species
Protozoans	Giardia intestinalis
Monogeneans	Cathariotrema selachii
Flukes	Campula oblonga (not usual host); Paronatrema vaginicola
Tapeworms	Acanthobothrium coronatum; Anthobothrium laciniatum; Crossobothrium angustum; Floriceps uncinatus; Hepatoxylon trichiuri; Lacistorhynchus tenuis; Marsupiobothrium alopias; Molicola uncinatus; Monorygma megacotyla; Paraorygmatobothrium exiguum; Paraorygmatobothrium filiforme; Sphyriocephalus tergetinus; Sphyriocephalus viridis
Copepods	Dinemoura discrepans; Dinemoura producta; Echthrogaleus denticulatus; Gangliopus pyriformis; Kroeyerina benzorum; Nemesis aggregatus; Nemesis lamna; Nemesis robusta; Nemesis tiburo; Nesippus orientalis; Pandarus smithii; Pandarus cranchii
