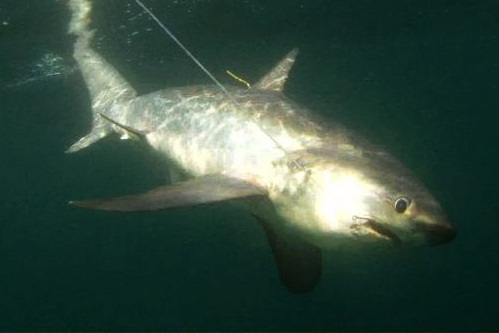

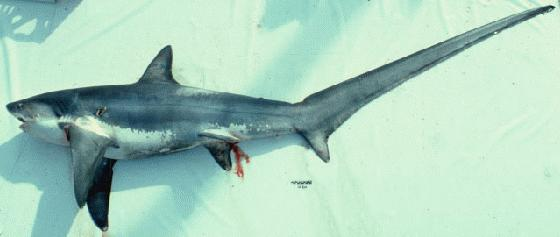

Conservation status
- Vulnerable (IUCN 3.1)
- CITES Appendix II

Scientific classification
- Kingdom: Animalia
- Phylum: Chordata
- Class: Chondrichthyes
- Subclass: Elasmobranchii
- Division: Selachii
- Order: Lamniformes
- Family: Alopiidae
- Genus: Alopias
- Species: A. vulpinus

Binomial name
- Alopias vulpinus (Bonnaterre, 1788)
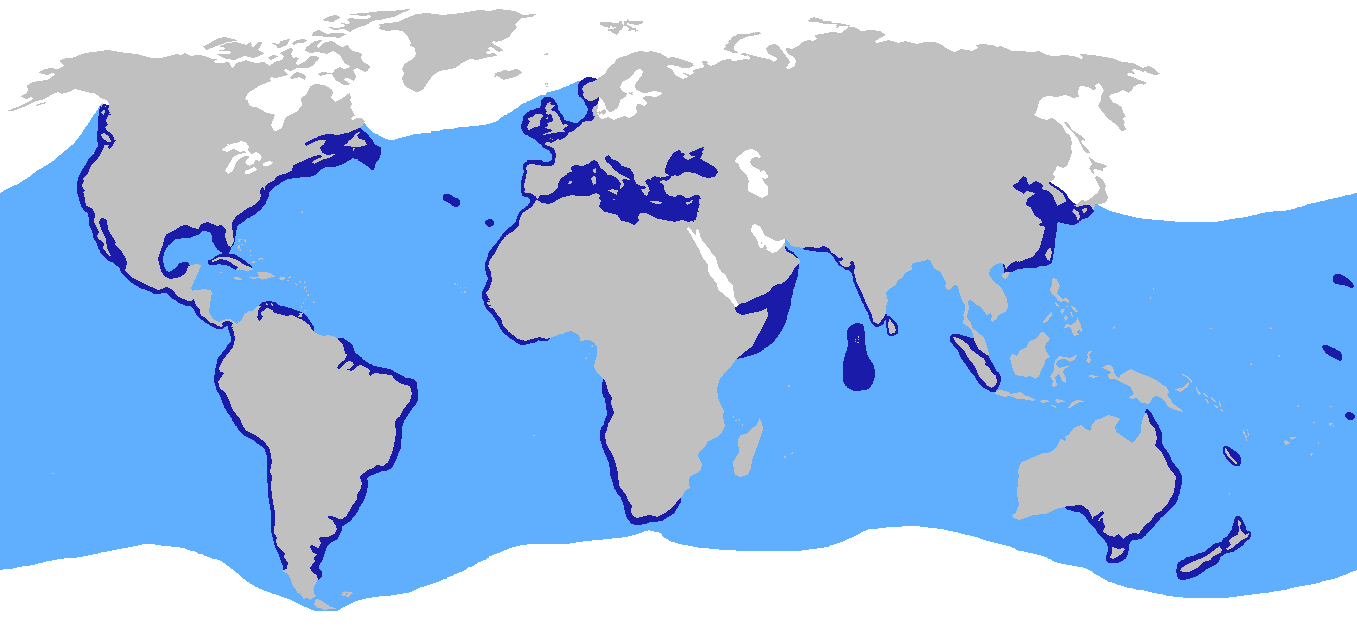
- Confirmed (dark blue) and suspected (light blue) range of the common thresher

Synonyms
- List: Squalus vulpinus Bonnaterre, 1788; Squalus vulpes Bonnaterre, 1788; Squalus vulpes Gmelin, 1789; Alopecias vulpes (Gmelin, 1789); Alopias vulpes (Gmelin, 1789); Carcharias vulpes (Gmelin, 1789); Galeus vulpecula Rafinesque, 1810; Alopias macrourus Rafinesque, 1810; Squalus alopecias Gronow, 1854; Alopecias barrae Perez Canto, 1886; Alopecias longimana Philippi, 1902; Alopecias chilensis Philippi, 1902; Vulpecula marina Garman, 1913; Alopias caudatus Phillipps, 1932; Alopias greyi Whitley, 1937; Alopias superciliosus (non Lowe, 1841) misapplied; Alopias pelagicus (non Nakamura, 1935) misapplied

= Common thresher =

Species of shark

The common thresher (Alopias vulpinus), also known as Atlantic thresher, is the largest species of thresher shark, family Alopiidae, reaching 6 m (20 ft) in length. About half of its length consists of the elongated upper lobe of its caudal fin. With a streamlined body, short pointed snout, and modestly sized eyes, the common thresher resembles the pelagic thresher (A. pelagicus). It can be distinguished from the latter species by the white of its belly extending in a band over the bases of its pectoral fins. The common thresher is distributed worldwide in tropical and temperate waters, though it prefers cooler temperatures. It can be found both close to shore and in the open ocean, from the surface to a depth of 550 m (1,800 ft). It is seasonally migratory and spends summers at lower latitudes.

The long tail of the common thresher, the source of many fanciful tales through history, is used in a whip-like fashion to deliver incapacitating blows to its prey. This species feeds mainly on small schooling forage fishes such as herrings and anchovies. It is a fast, strong swimmer that has been known to leap clear of the water, and possesses physiological adaptations that allow it to maintain an internal body temperature warmer than that of the surrounding sea water. The common thresher has an aplacental viviparous mode of reproduction, with oophagous embryos that feed on undeveloped eggs ovulated by their mother. Females typically give birth to four pups at a time, following a gestation period of nine months.

Despite its size, the common thresher is minimally dangerous to humans due to its relatively small teeth and timid disposition. It is highly valued by commercial fishers for its meat, fins, hide, and liver oil; large numbers are taken by longline and gillnet fisheries throughout its range. This shark is also esteemed by recreational anglers for the exceptional fight it offers on hook-and-line. The common thresher has a low rate of reproduction and cannot withstand heavy fishing pressure for long, a case in point being the rapid collapse of the thresher shark fishery off California in the 1980s. With commercial exploitation increasing in many parts of the world, the International Union for Conservation of Nature has assessed this species as vulnerable.

== Taxonomy and phylogeny ==
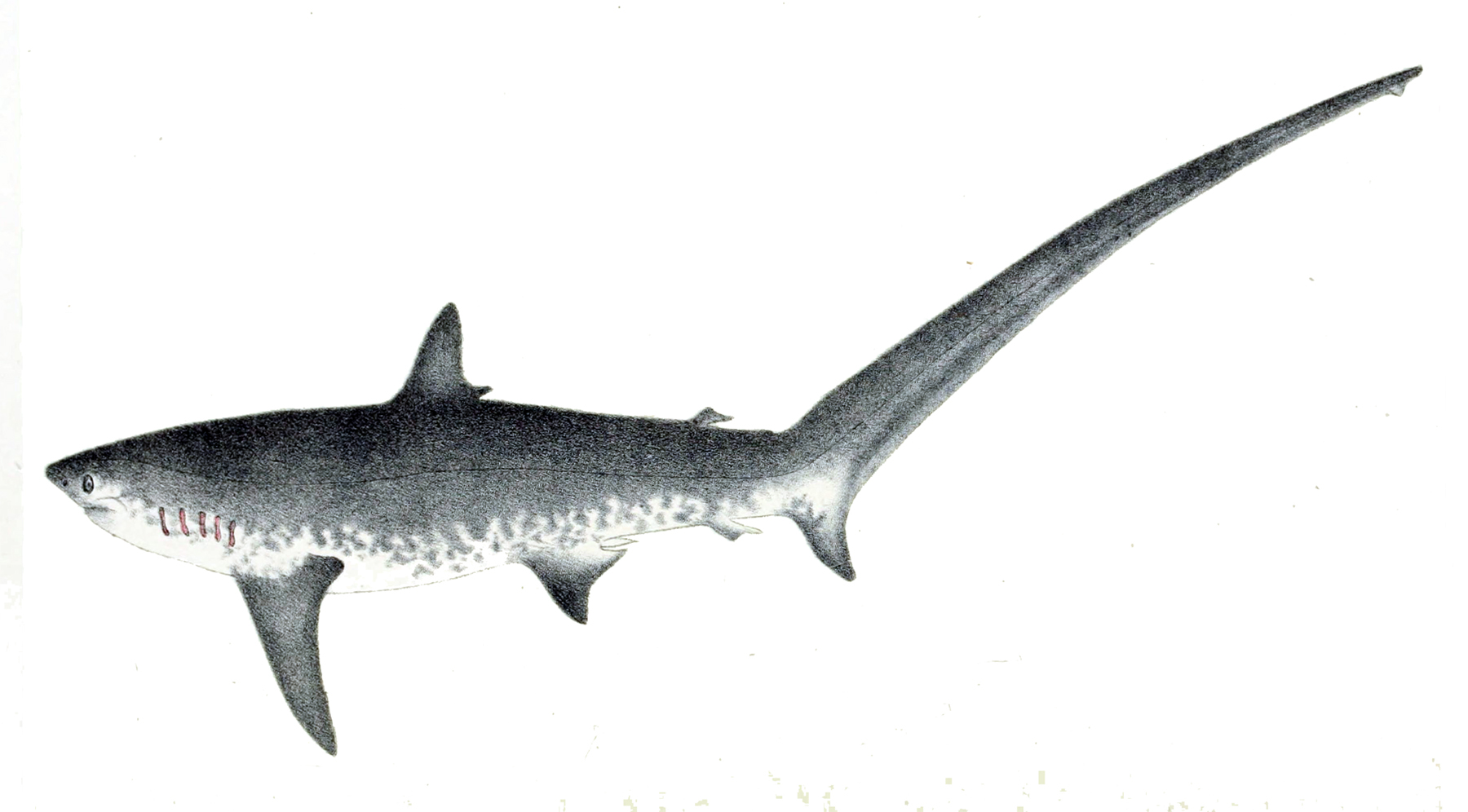
Early illustration of a common thresher from Natural History of Victoria (1881)

The first scientific description of the common thresher, as Squalus vulpinus, was written by French naturalist Pierre Joseph Bonnaterre in the 1788 Tableau encyclopédique et méthodique des trois règnes de la nature. In 1810, Constantine Samuel Rafinesque described Alopias macrourus from a thresher shark caught off Sicily. Later authors recognized the genus Alopias as valid, while synonymizing A. macrourus with S. vulpinus, thus the common thresher's scientific name became Alopias vulpinus.

The specific epithet vulpinus is derived from the Latin vulpes meaning "fox", and in some older literature the species name was given incorrectly as Alopias vulpes. "Fox shark" is the earliest known English name for this species and is rooted in classical antiquity, from a belief that it was especially cunning. In the mid-19th century, the name "fox" was mostly superseded by "thresher", referencing the shark's flail-like use of its tail. This species is often known simply as thresher shark or thresher; Henry Bigelow and William Schroeder introduced the name "common thresher" in 1945 to differentiate it from the bigeye thresher (A. superciliosus). It is also known by many other common names, including Atlantic thresher, grayfish, green thresher, long-tailed shark, sea ape, sea fox, slasher, swiveltail, thintail thresher, thrasher shark, and whiptail shark.

Morphological and allozyme analyses have agreed that the common thresher is basal to the clade formed by the bigeye thresher and the pelagic thresher (A. pelagicus). The closest relative of this species within the family may be a fourth, unrecognized thresher shark species off Baja California, reported from allozyme evidence by Blaise Eitner in 1995. However, the existence of this fourth species has yet to be confirmed by other sources.

== Description ==
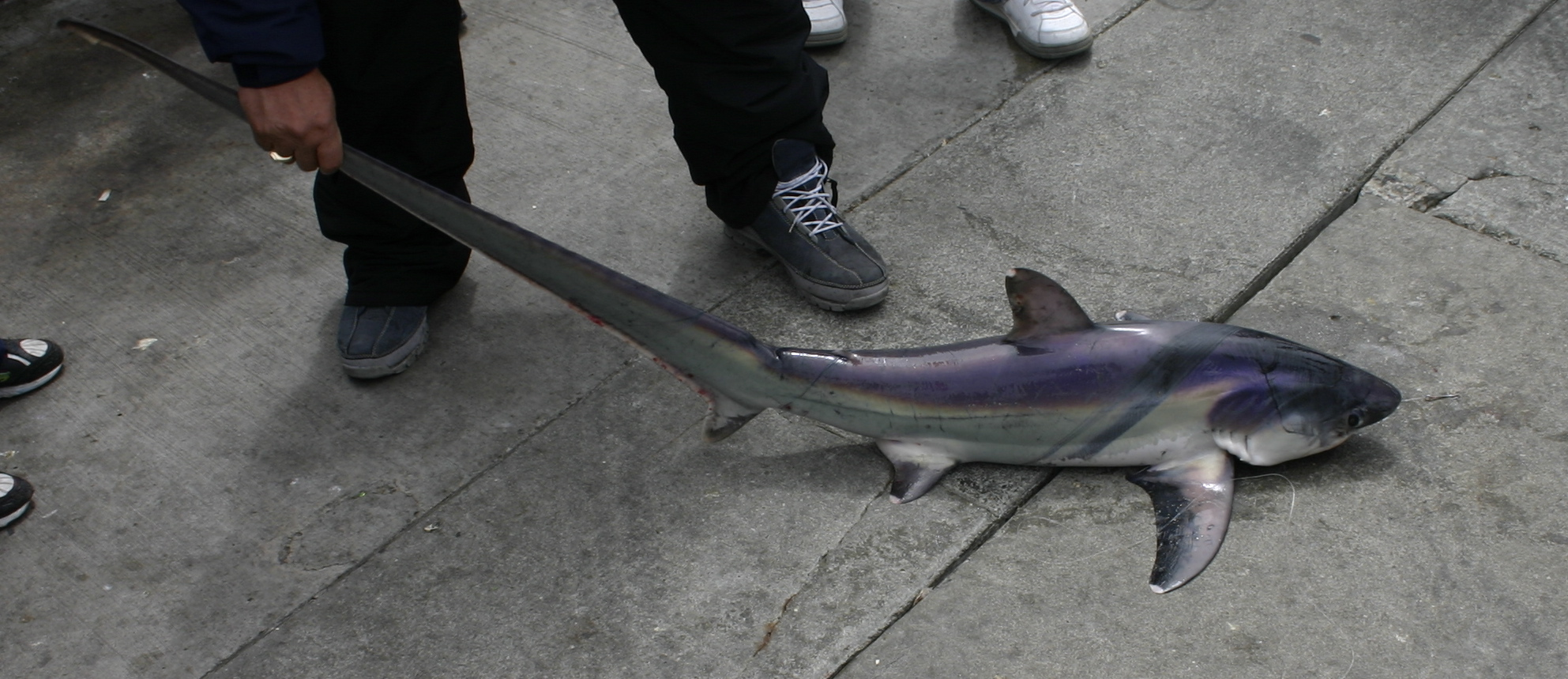
The common thresher can be distinguished from other thresher sharks by the appearance of its head and the coloration above its pectoral fins.

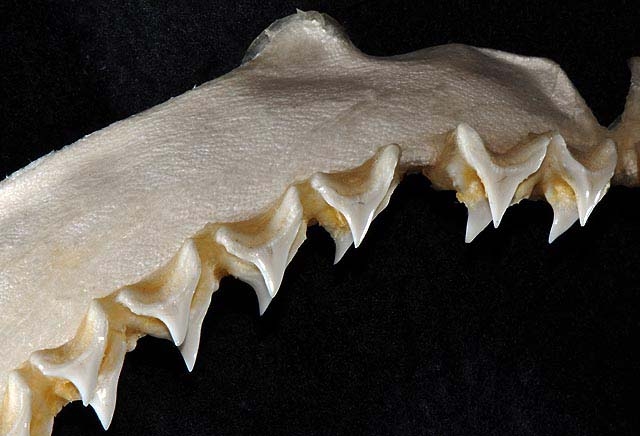
Teeth

The common thresher is a fairly robust shark with a torpedo-shaped trunk and a short, broad head. The dorsal profile of the head curves evenly down to the pointed, conical snout. The eyes are moderately large and lack nictitating membranes. The small mouth is arched and, unlike in other thresher sharks, has furrows at the corners. The species has 32–53 upper and 25–50 lower tooth rows; the teeth are small, triangular, and smooth-edged, lacking lateral cusplets. The five pairs of gill slits are short, with the fourth and fifth pairs located over the pectoral fin bases.

The long, falcate (sickle-shaped) pectoral fins taper to narrowly pointed tips. The first dorsal fin is tall and positioned slightly closer to the pectoral fins than the pelvic fins. The pelvic fins are almost as large as the first dorsal fin and bear long, thin claspers in males. The second dorsal and anal fins are tiny, with the former positioned ahead of the latter. Crescent-shaped notches occur on the caudal peduncle at the upper and lower origins of the caudal fin. The upper caudal fin lobe is enormously elongated as is characteristic of threshers, measuring about as long as the rest of the shark; the thin, gently curving lobe is held at a steep upward angle and has a notch in the trailing margin near the tip.

The skin is covered by small, overlapping dermal denticles, each with three horizontal ridges and three to five marginal teeth. This species is metallic purplish brown to gray above, becoming more bluish on the flanks. The underside is white, which extends over the pectoral and pelvic fin bases; this pattern is in contrast to the pelagic thresher, which is solidly colored over these fins. The meeting line between the dorsal and ventral coloration is often irregular. A white spot may be seen at the tips of the pectoral fins. The common thresher is the largest thresher shark species, commonly reaching 5 m (16 ft) long and 230 kg (510 lb) in weight. The confirmed length record for this shark is 5.7 m (19 ft), while the maximum possible length may be 6.1–6.5 m (20–21 ft). The heaviest individual on record is a 4.8 m (16 ft) female that weighed 510 kg (1,120 lb). Exceptional specimens may possibly weigh up to 900 kg (2,000 lb), though such claims are not verified yet.

== Distribution ==
The range of the common thresher encompasses tropical and cold-temperate waters worldwide. In the western Atlantic, it is found from Newfoundland to the Gulf of Mexico, though it is rare north of New England, and from Venezuela to Argentina. In the eastern Atlantic, it has been reported from the North Sea and the British Isles to Ghana (including Madeira, the Azores, and the Mediterranean and Black Seas), as well as from Angola to South Africa. In the Indo-Pacific, this species is known from Tanzania to India and the Maldives, Japan, and Korea to southeastern China, Sumatra, eastern Australia, and New Zealand; it also occurs around a number of Pacific islands including New Caledonia, the Society Islands, Tabuaeran, and the Hawaiian Islands. In the eastern Pacific, it has been recorded from British Columbia to Chile, including the Gulf of California.

The common thresher is migratory, moving to higher latitudes following warm-water masses. In the eastern Pacific, males travel further than females, reaching as far as Vancouver Island in the late summer and early fall. Juveniles tend to remain in warm nursery areas. In New Zealand waters juveniles can be found over the inner shelf around the North Island and around the upper South Island. Separate populations with different life history characteristics apparently exist in the eastern Pacific and western Indian Ocean and possibly elsewhere; this species is not known to make transoceanic movements. In the northwestern Indian Ocean, males and females segregate by location and depth during the pupping season from January to May. Analysis of mitochondrial DNA has revealed substantial regional genetic variation within common threshers in all three oceans. This could support the idea that sharks from different areas, despite being highly mobile, rarely interbreed.

== Habitat ==
Common threshers are inhabitants of both continental waters and the open ocean. They tend to be most abundant in proximity to land, particularly the juveniles, which frequent near-coastal habitats such as bays. The species has been described as "coastal–oceanic", mostly occurring within 30 km (20 mi) of the coast with considerably lower populations beyond this limit. Most individuals are encountered near the surface, but this species has been recorded to at least a depth of 550 m (1,800 ft). Among eight individuals tagged and tracked for 22–49 hours off southern California, all spent the majority of their time within 40 m (130 ft) of the water surface, but periodically dived much deeper, in five individuals to depths of around 100 m (330 ft) or more. A study from the tropical Marshall Islands indicated that common threshers mainly spend the day at depths of about 160–240 m (520–790 ft) where the temperature is 18–20 °C (64–68 °F). Common threshers appear to prefer water temperatures between 16 and 21 °C (61 and 70 °F), but at least occasionally occur down to around 9 °C (48 °F).

== Biology and ecology ==
Common threshers are active, strong swimmers, with infrequent reports of them leaping completely out of the water. Like the fast-swimming sharks of the family Lamnidae, the common thresher has a strip of aerobic red muscle along its flank that is able to contract powerfully and efficiently for long periods of time. In addition, they have slow-oxidative muscles centrally located within their bodies and a blood vessel countercurrent exchange system called the rete mirabile ("wonderful net"), allowing them to generate and retain body heat. The temperature inside the red muscles of a common thresher averages 2 °C (3.6 °F) above that of the ambient seawater, though significant individual variation is seen. Unlike the pelagic and bigeye threshers, the common thresher lacks an orbital rete mirabile to protect its eyes and brain from temperature changes.

Immature common threshers fall prey to larger sharks. Aside from observations of killer whales feeding on common threshers off New Zealand, adults have no known natural predators. Parasites documented from the common thresher include the protozoan Giardia intestinalis, the trematodes Campula oblonga (not usual host) and Paronatrema vaginicola, the tapeworms Acanthobothrium coronatum, Anthobothrium laciniatum, Crossobothrium angustum, Hepatoxylon trichiuri, Molicola uncinatus, Paraorygmatobothrium exiguum, P. filiforme, and Sphyriocephalus tergetinus, and the copepods Dinemoura discrepans, Echthrogaleus denticulatus, Gangliopus pyriformis, Kroeyerina benzorum, Nemesis aggregatus, N. robusta, N. tiburo, Nesippus orientalis, and Pandarus smithii.

=== Feeding ===
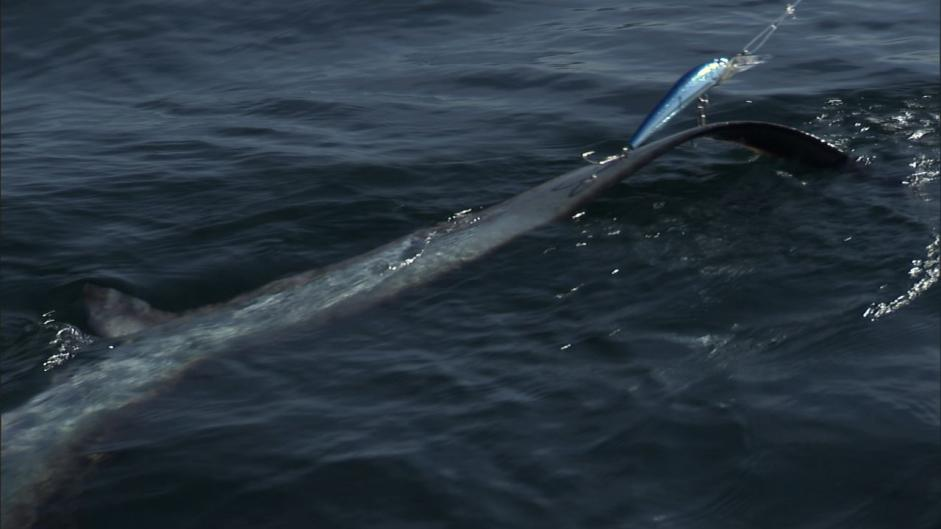
The common thresher is often hooked by the tail, because it uses its long caudal fin to attack prey.

The long upper tailfin lobe of the common thresher is used to strike and incapacitate prey.

Some 97% of the common thresher's diet is composed of bony fishes, mostly small schooling forage fish such as sardine, anchovy, mackerel, hake, bluefish, herring, needlefish, and lanternfish. Before striking, the sharks compact schools of prey by swimming around them and splashing the water with their tails, often in pairs or small groups. Threshers are also known to take large, solitary fishes such as lancetfish, as well as squid and other pelagic invertebrates. Off California, common threshers feed mostly on the northern anchovy (Engraulis mordax), with Pacific hake (Merluccius productus), Pacific sardine (Sardinops sagax), Pacific mackerel (Scomber japonicus), market squid (Loligo opalescens), and pelagic red crab (Pleuroncodes planipes) also being important food items. The sharks concentrate on a few prey species during cold-water years, but become less discriminating during less productive, warmer El Niño periods.

Numerous accounts have been given of common threshers using the long upper lobes of their tail fins to stun prey, and they are often snagged on longlines by their tails after presumably striking at the bait. In July 1914, shark-watcher Russell J. Coles reported seeing a thresher shark use its tail to flip prey fish into its mouth, and that one fish that missed was thrown a "considerable distance". On April 14, 1923, noted oceanographer W.E. Allen observed a 2 m (6.6 ft) thresher shark pursuing a California smelt (Atherinopsis californiensis) off a pier at the Scripps Institution of Oceanography. The shark overtook the small fish and swung its tail above the water like a "coachwhip" with "confusing speed", severely injuring its target. In the winter of 1865, Irish ichthyologist Harry Blake-Knox claimed to have seen a thresher shark in Dublin Bay use its tail to strike a wounded loon (probably a great northern diver, Gavia immer), which it then swallowed. Blake-Knox's account was subsequently disputed by other authorities, who asserted that the thresher's tail is not rigid or muscular enough to effect such a blow.

=== Life history ===
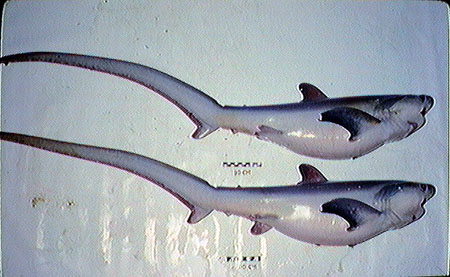
Embryos of the common thresher are nourished by eggs during development.

Like other mackerel sharks, common threshers are aplacental viviparous. They give birth to litters of two to four (rarely six) pups in the eastern Pacific, and three to seven pups in the eastern Atlantic. They are believed to reproduce throughout their range; one known nursery area is the Southern California Bight. Breeding occurs in the summer, usually July or August, and parturition occurs from March to June following a gestation period of nine months. The developing embryos are oophagous, feeding on eggs ovulated by the mother. The teeth of small embryos are peg-like and nonfunctional, being covered by a sheath of soft tissues. As the embryos mature, their series of teeth become progressively more like those of adults in shape, though they remain depressed and hidden until shortly before birth.

Newborn pups usually measure 114–160 cm (3.74–5.25 ft) long and weigh 5–6 kg (11–13 lb), depending on the size of the mother. The juveniles grow about 50 cm (1.6 ft) a year, while adults grow about 10 cm (0.33 ft) a year. The size at maturation appears to vary between populations. In the eastern North Pacific, males mature at 3.3 m (11 ft) and five years old, and females around 2.6–4.5 m (8.5–14.8 ft) and seven years old. They are known to live to at least 15 years and their maximum lifespan has been estimated to be 45–50 years.

== Relationship with humans ==
The common thresher poses less danger to humans than sharks of similar size. Most divers report that they are shy and difficult to approach under water. The International Shark Attack File lists a single provoked attack by the thresher shark and four attacks on boats, which were probably incidental from individuals fighting capture.

=== Commercial fishing ===
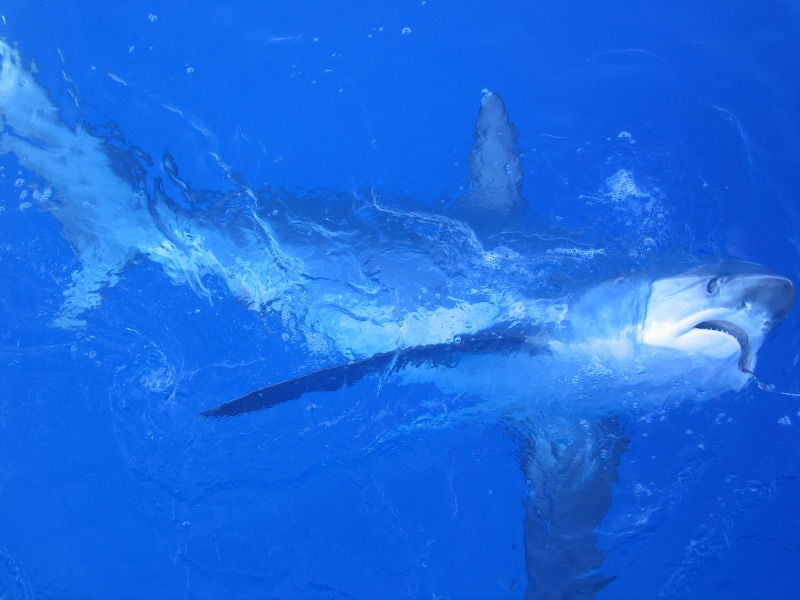
The thresher shark is taken commercially by many countries. Here a common thresher is hooked on a longline

The common thresher is widely caught by offshore longline and pelagic gillnet fisheries, especially in the northwestern Indian Ocean, the western, central, and eastern Pacific, and the North Atlantic. Participating countries include the former USSR, Japan, Taiwan, Spain, the United States, Brazil, Uruguay, and Mexico. The meat is highly prized for human consumption cooked, dried and salted, or smoked. In addition, their skin is made into leather, their liver oil is processed for vitamins, and their fins are used for shark fin soup. The United Nations Food and Agriculture Organization reported a worldwide common thresher take of 411 metric tons in 2006.

In the United States, a drift gillnet fishery for the common thresher developed in southern California in 1977, beginning with 10 vessels experimenting with a larger-sized mesh. Within two years, the fleet had increased to 40 vessels, and the fishery peaked in 1982 when 228 vessels landed 1,091 metric tons. The common thresher population rapidly collapsed from overfishing, with landings decreasing to less than 300 metric tons a year by the late 1980s and larger size classes disappearing from the population. Common threshers are still taken commercially in the United States, with about 85% coming from the Pacific and 15% from the Atlantic. The largest catches remain from the California-Oregon gillnet fishery, which had shifted its focus to the more valuable swordfish (Xiphias gladius), but still takes threshers as bycatch. Small numbers of Pacific threshers are also taken by harpoons, small-mesh driftnets, and longlines. In the Atlantic, threshers are primarily taken on longlines meant for swordfish and tuna.

=== Recreational fishing ===
Common threshers are well regarded by sports fishers as one of the strongest fighting sharks alongside the shortfin mako shark (Isurus oxyrhinchus), and are ranked as game fish by the International Game Fish Association. They are pursued by anglers using rod and reel off California, South Africa, and elsewhere. Frank Mundus has called thresher sharks "exceedingly stubborn" and "pound for pound, a harder fish to whip" than the mako. Fishing for the common thresher is similar to that for the mako; the recommended equipment is a 24 kg (53 lb) rod and a big-game reel holding at least 365 m (400 yd) of 24 kg (53 lb) line. The ideal method is trolling with baitfish, either deep or allowing it to drift.

=== Conservation ===
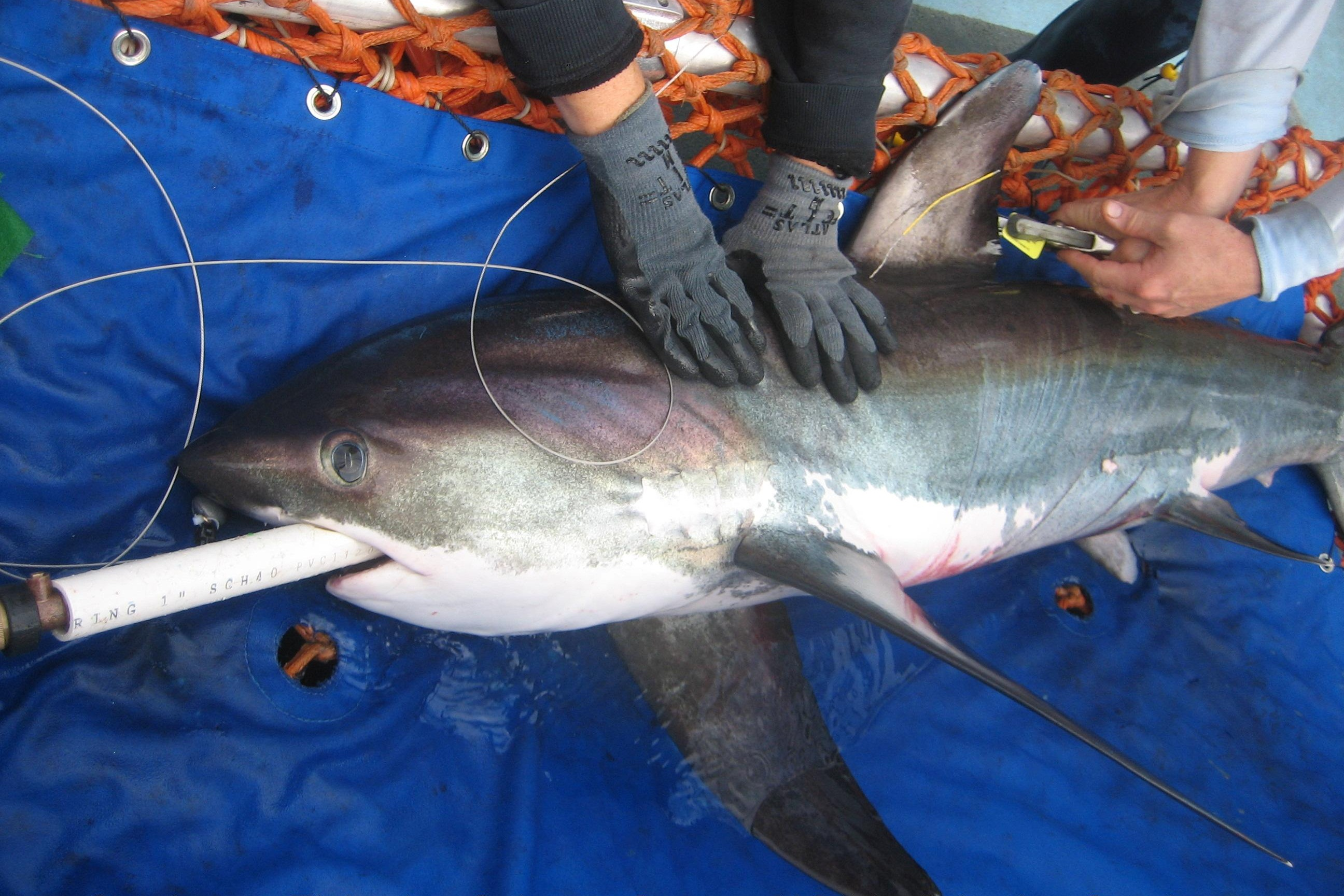
NOAA researchers tagging a common thresher - such efforts are critical for developing conservation measures.

All three thresher shark species were reassessed from Data Deficient to Vulnerable by the International Union for Conservation of Nature in 2007. The rapid collapse of the Californian subpopulation (over 50% within three generations) prompted concerns regarding the species' susceptibility to overfishing in other areas, where fishery data are seldom reported and aspects of life history and population structure are little known. In addition to continued fishing pressure, common threshers are also taken as bycatch in other gear such as bottom trawls and fish traps, and are considered a nuisance by mackerel fishers, as they become entangled in the nets.

The United States manages common thresher fisheries by regulations such as commercial quotas and trip limits, and recreational minimum sizes and retention limits. Shark finning is illegal under U.S. federal law. The Atlantic common thresher fishery is regulated by the National Marine Fisheries Service Highly Migratory Species Management Division through the 2006 Consolidated Atlantic Highly Migratory Species Fishery Management Plan (FMP), and the Pacific common thresher fishery is regulated by the Pacific Fishery Management Council through the FMP for U.S. West Coast Fisheries for Highly Migratory Species. In the 1990s, after the depletion of common thresher stocks by the California gillnet fishery, the fleet was limited to 70 boats and restrictions were placed on season, operation range, and landings. Some evidence shows the California subpopulation is recovering, and the potential population growth rate has been estimated to be 4–7% per year.

In New Zealand, the Department of Conservation has classified the common thresher shark as "Not Threatened" under the New Zealand Threat Classification System.

== Historical perceptions ==
The Greek philosopher Aristotle (384–322 BCE) wrote some of the earliest observations about the common thresher. In his Historia Animalia, he claimed that hooked threshers had a propensity for freeing themselves by biting through fishing lines, and that they protected their young by swallowing them. These "clever" behaviors, which have not been borne out by science, led the ancient Greeks to call it alopex (meaning "fox"), on which its modern scientific name is based.

An oft-repeated myth about the common thresher is that they cooperate with swordfish to attack whales. In one version of events, the thresher shark circles the whale and distracts it by beating the sea to a froth with its tail, thereby allowing the swordfish to impale it in a vulnerable spot with its rostrum. In an alternate account, the swordfish positions itself beneath the whale, while the thresher leaps out of the water and lands on top of the whale, hammering it onto the swordfish's rostrum. Yet other authors describe the thresher "cutting huge gashes" in the side of the whale with its tail. Neither threshers nor swordfish, however, are known to feed on whales or indeed possess the dentition to do so. The story may have arisen from mariners mistaking the tall dorsal fins of killer whales, which do attack large cetaceans, for thresher shark tails. Swordfish bills have also been found embedded in blue and fin whales (likely accidents due to the fast-moving fish's inertia), and thresher sharks do exhibit some of the aforementioned behaviors independent of whales.
