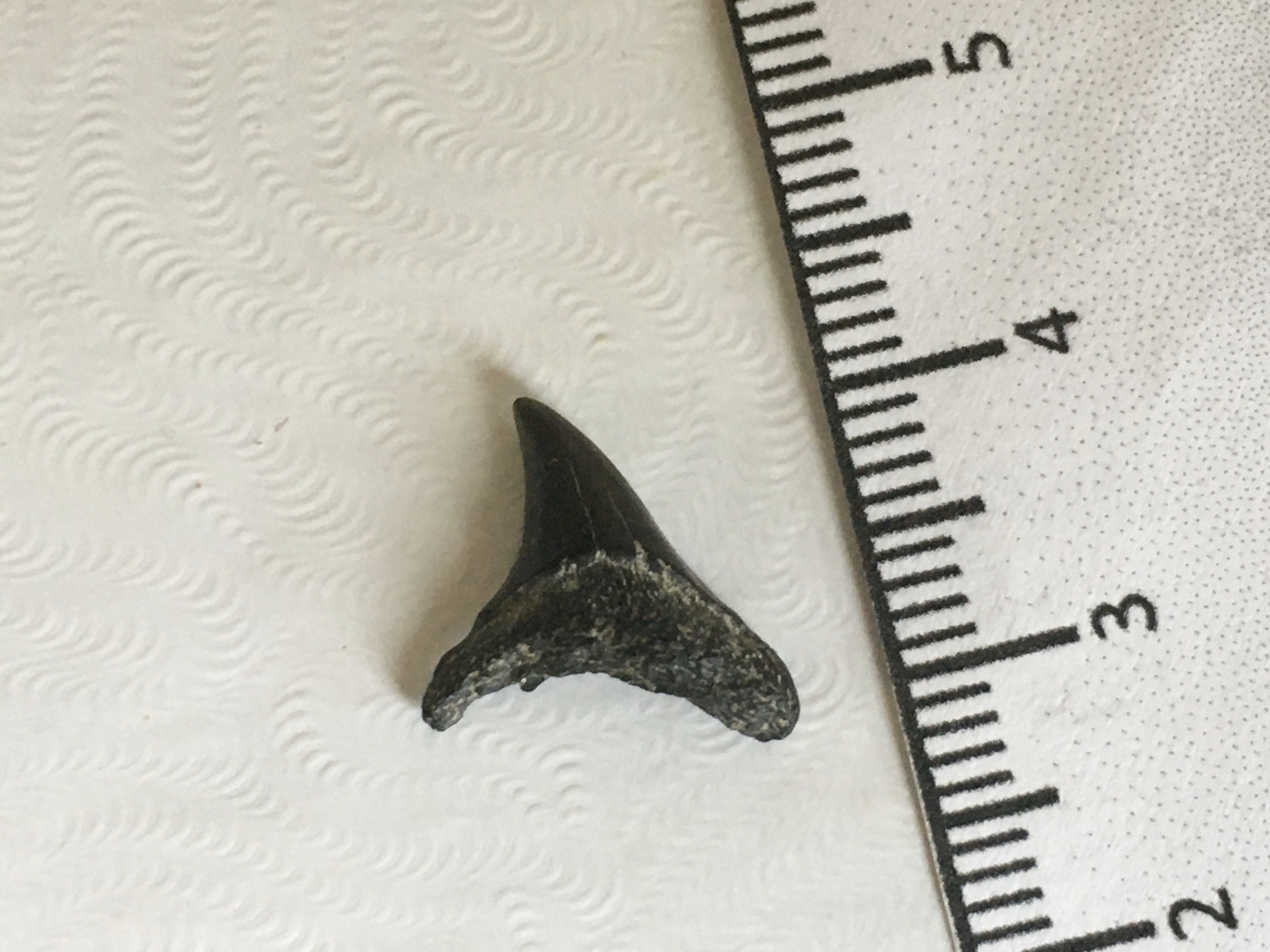
- Tooth of A. latidens, found in Calvert Formation.

Scientific classification
- Kingdom: Animalia
- Phylum: Chordata
- Class: Chondrichthyes
- Subclass: Elasmobranchii
- Division: Selachii
- Order: Lamniformes
- Family: Alopiidae
- Genus: Alopias
- Species: †A. latidens

Binomial name
- †Alopias latidens (Leriche, 1909)

Synonyms
- Alopecias latidens; Vulpecula latidens

= Alopias latidens =

Alopias latidens Temporal range: Early Miocene

Extinct species of shark

Alopias latidens is an extinct species of thresher shark, that lived in the Early Miocene, known from only teeth found in North America, Europe, Asia, and Australia.
