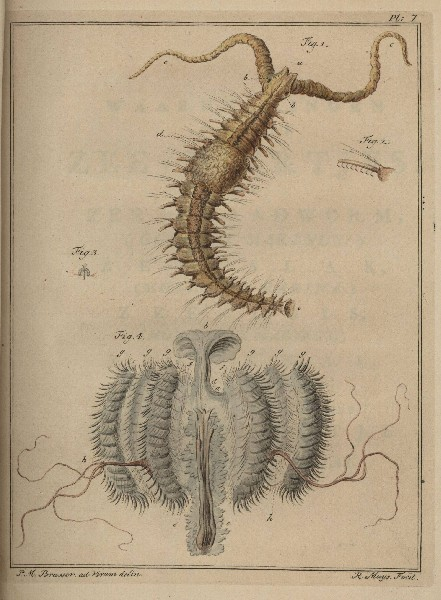
- Polydora ciliata (above)

Scientific classification
- Kingdom: Animalia
- Phylum: Annelida
- Clade: Pleistoannelida
- Clade: Sedentaria
- Order: Spionida
- Family: Spionidae
- Subfamily: Spioninae
- Genus: Polydora; Bosc d'Antic, 1802

Species
- See text

= Polydora (annelid) =

Genus of annelids

Polydora is a genus of annelid worms. It contains marine polychaete species that live in mud, holes bored in rocks, and holes bored in the shells of shellfish.

Some shell- and rock-boring polydora worms leave a characteristic double hole in the rock and shells in which they burrow.

== Etymology ==
From the Ancient Greek Πολυδωρη, from Polydora, daughter of Tethys and Ocean in Greek mythology.

== Economic effects ==
Polydora species are a major economic issue for parts of the shellfish industry. Some species cause "mudblister" on oysters, living inside the oyster shell and roughening its interior surface. Although this makes the oyster grow much more slowly, and makes the shell ugly and harder to sell, the meat of the oyster is still fit to eat.

Due to the accidental introduction of the mud worm Polydora websteri in 1888 to 1898, which was introduced with Saccostrea glomerata spat from New Zealand, the Native flat or mud oyster Ostrea angasi experienced local extinction in the estuaries on the East Coast north of the Clyde River, Australia.

== List of Polydora species ==
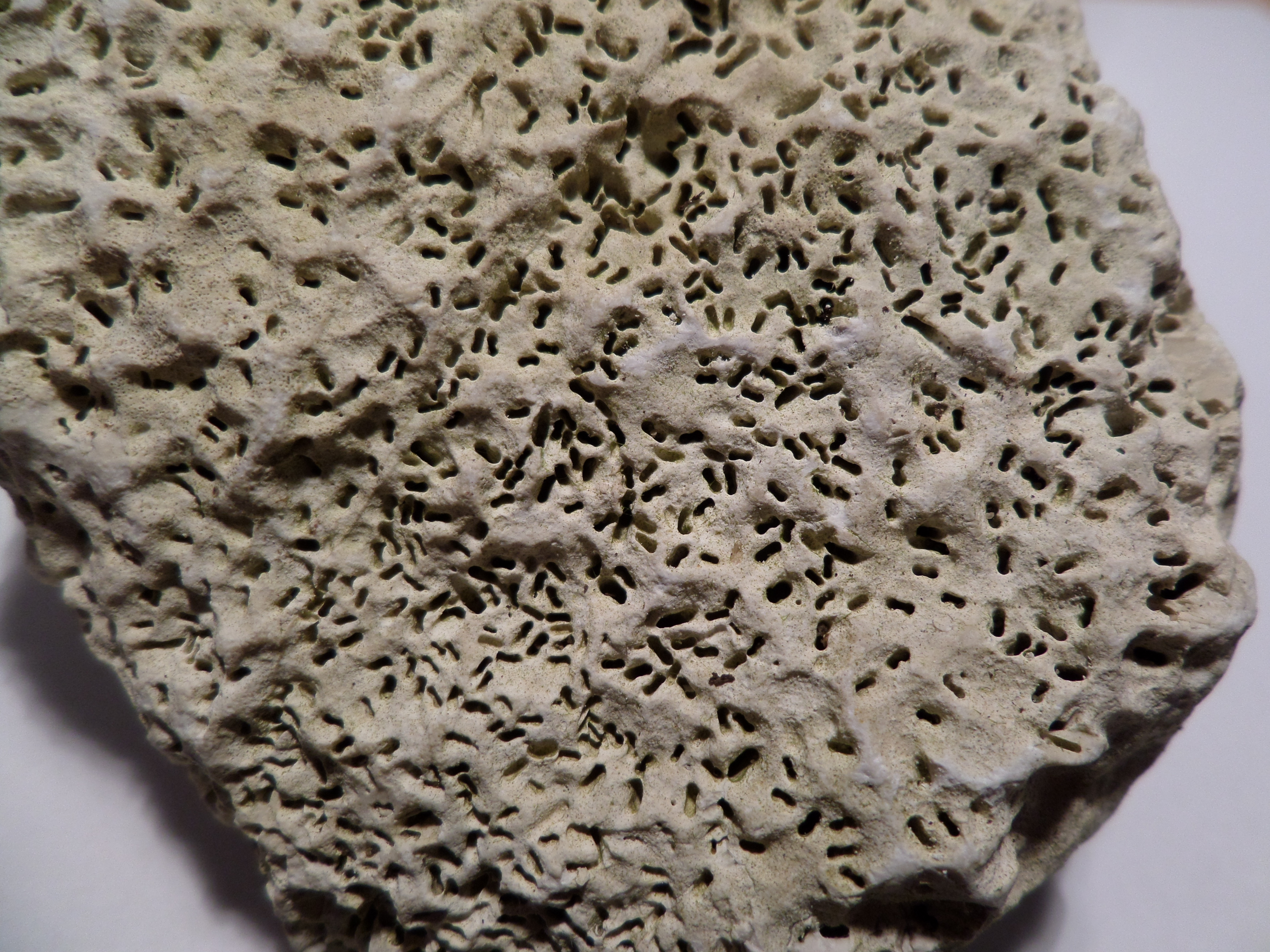
Characteristic double "sunglasses" holes left by Polydora ciliata burrowing in rock.

- Polydora aciculata
- Polydora aggregata
- Polydora anoculata
- Polydora armata Langerhans, 1880
- Polydora barbilla
- Polydora bioccipitalis
- Polydora blakei
- Polydora brachycephala
- Polydora caeca
- Polydora cardalia
- Polydora caulleryi
- Polydora ciliata
- Polydora cirrosa
- Polydora colonia Moore
- Polydora commensalis Andrews
- Polydora concharum
- Polydora convexa
- Polydora cornuta Bosc, 1802
- Polydora elegantissima
- Polydora flava Claparede, 1870
- Polydora giardi
- Polydora glycymerica Radashevsky, 1993
- Polydora gracilis
- Polydora hartmanae
- Polydora haswelli
- Polydora hermaphroditica Hannerz, 1956
- Polydora heterochaeta
- Polydora hoplura Claparede, 1870
- Polydora kaneohe Ward, 1981
- Polydora latispinosa
- Polydora ligni Webster
- Polydora limicola
- Polydora magna
- Polydora narica
- Polydora neocardalia
- Polydora notialis
- Polydora nuchalis
- Polydora pilikia Ward, 1981
- Polydora pilocollaris
- Polydora posthamata Jones, 1962
- Polydora protuberata
- Polydora pygidialis
- Polydora quadrilobata Jacobi
- Polydora socialis (Schmarda)
- Polydora spongicola
- Polydora tentaculata
- Polydora tetrabranchia
- Polydora tridenticulata Woodwick, 1964
- Polydora websteri Hartman, 1943
- Polydora woodwicki
