= Alopias subexigua =

Alopias subexigua Temporal range: Eocene–Miocene

Scientific classification
- Kingdom: Animalia
- Phylum: Chordata
- Class: Chondrichthyes
- Subclass: Elasmobranchii
- Division: Selachii
- Order: Lamniformes
- Family: Alopiidae
- Genus: Alopias
- Species: A. subexigua

Binomial name
- Alopias subexigua Darteville & Casier, 1959

Extinct species of shark

Alopias subexigua is an extinct species of thresher shark, that lived in the Eocene to Miocene. It is known only from teeth. Alopias subexigua was discovered in North America, in California, Asia, Portugal, and Africa.

== Classification ==
The classification of A. subexigua is in debate, as is the case of most sharks. A. subexigua is a related species to the also extinct Small or Modest Thresher shark (Alopias exigua), whose fossils are very similar to genus Isurus. A. subexigua is placed in the family Alopiidae.
