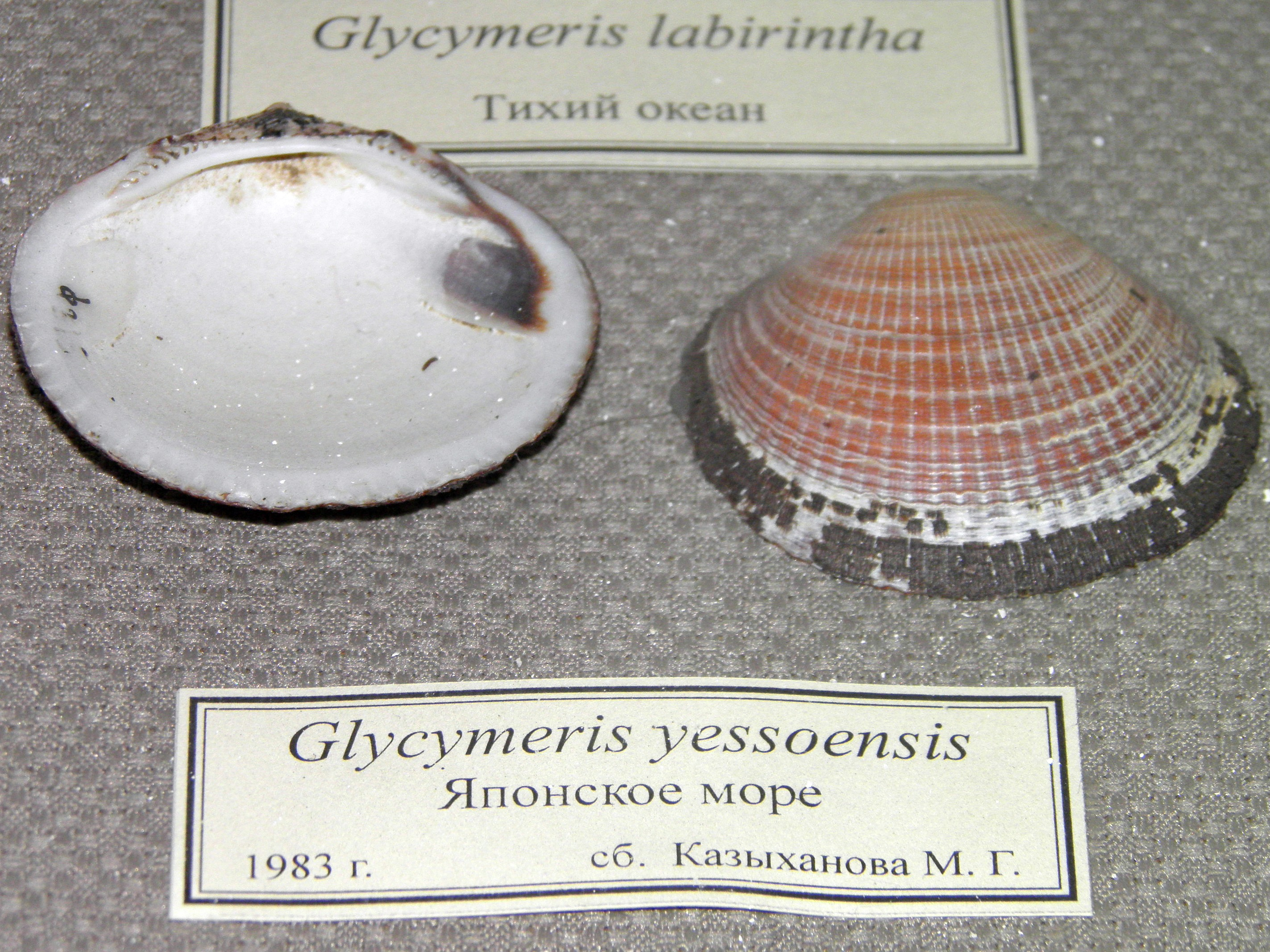
- Interior and exterior of shell

Scientific classification
- Kingdom: Animalia
- Phylum: Mollusca
- Class: Bivalvia
- Order: Arcida
- Family: Glycymerididae
- Genus: Glycymeris
- Species: G. yessoensis

Binomial name
- Glycymeris yessoensis (Sowerby III, 1889)

= Glycymeris yessoensis =

Species of bivalve

Glycymeris yessoensis is a species of bivalve mollusc in the family Glycymerididae. It can be found burrowing in soft sediment in shallow water in the Pacific Ocean around the coasts of China and Japan. It is often associated with a polychaete worm with which it forms a commensal relationship.

== Taxonomy and evolution ==
This species was first described by the British malacologist George Brettingham Sowerby III in 1889 (or 1888). It has a long fossil record, having been found in formations in southwestern Sakhalin dating back to the lower middle Miocene, with numerous occurrences in the Neogene and Quaternary periods in northern Japan. In the fossils it is possible to observe changing patterns of drilling predation over the aeons, with the sites of drill holes varying with time, perhaps due to a change in the principle predators, from Glossaulax to Cryptonatica. Almost unispecific beds of fossils of Glycymeris yessoensis are found in the Onma Formation in central Japan.

== Distribution and habitat ==
Glycymeris yessoensis is native to the north central Pacific Ocean where it occurs in the Yellow Sea and the Sea of Japan, its range extending as far north as the Kamchatka Peninsula. It is found burrowing in sand at depths ranging between the intertidal zone and 60 m (200 ft).

== Ecology ==
Glycymeris yessoensis can live for 45 years. It is a filter feeder, drawing water in through one siphon and expelling it through another. It often acts as a commensal host to the boring polychaete worm Polydora glycymerica. This worm burrows into the bivalve's shell creating a U-shaped burrow near the mollusc's siphon, intercepting some of the food particles from the feeding current created by the mollusc.
