= Roch Roszczak =

Polish zoologist

Roch Roszczak (4 August 1906 - 8 May 1986) was a Polish zoologist. Roszczak worked in Zakład Morfologii Zwierzat at Adam Mickiewicz University in Poznań.
