= Alloenzyme =

Variant form of an enzyme

Alloenzymes (or also called allozymes) are variant forms of an enzyme which differ structurally but not functionally from other allozymes coded for by different alleles at the same locus. These are opposed to isozymes, which are enzymes that perform the same function, but which are coded by genes located at different loci.

Alloenzymes are common biological enzymes that exhibit high levels of functional evolutionary conservation throughout specific phyla and kingdoms. They are used by phylogeneticists as molecular markers to gauge evolutionary histories and relationships between different species. This can be done because allozymes do not have the same structure. They can be separated by capillary electrophoresis. However, some species are monomorphic for many of their allozymes which would make it difficult for phylogeneticists to assess the evolutionary histories of these species. In these instances, phylogeneticists would have to use another method to determine the evolutionary history of a species.

These enzymes generally perform very basic functions found commonly throughout all lifeforms, such as DNA polymerase, the enzyme that repairs and copies DNA. Significant changes in this enzyme reflect significant events in evolutionary history of organisms. As expected DNA polymerase shows relatively small differences in its amino acid sequence between phyla and even kingdoms.

The key to choosing which alloenzyme to use in a comparison between multiple species is to choose one that is as variable as possible while still being present in all the organisms. By comparing the amino acid sequence of the enzyme in the species, more amino acid similarities should be seen in species that are more closely related, and fewer between those that are more distantly related. The less well conserved the enzyme is, the more amino acid differences will be present in even closely related species.

== See also ==
- Comparative genomics
- Phylogenetics
- Molecular phylogeny
- Molecular evolution
- Homology (biology)
