= Beaverdam Formation (Delmarva) =

Geologic formation in Delaware and Maryland, United States

- Stratigraphic range: late Pliocene, ~3.6–2.58 Ma
- Type: Formation
- Unit of: Columbia Group
- Underlies: Walston silt (unconformably), Omar Formation (unconformably)
- Overlies: Bethany Formation (possibly unconformably), Manokin Formation (unconformably), St. Mary's Formation (unconformably)
- Thickness: 75-100 feet

Location
- Region: Delmarva Peninsula
- Country: United States

Type section
- Named for: Beaverdam Creek
- Named by: W.C. Rasmussen and T.H. Slaughter
- Year defined: 1955
- Country: United States

The Beaverdam Formation is an upper Pliocene geologic formation on the Delmarva Peninsula in southern Delaware and eastern Maryland. It is the largest major surficial layer on the Delmarva Peninsula and has a lower stream-deposited unit and an upper estuarine unit. These units may represent a cycle of regression and transgression. The Beaverdam Formation is heterogeneous and ranges from very coarse sand with pebbles to silty clay. It unconformably overlies the Manokin or St. Mary's formations and it is up to 75-100 feet thick.

The extent of the Beaverdam Formation is recognized from Delmar to the west and to Milford and Georgetown to the northeast.

== History ==
The Beaverdam Formation was originally named the Beaverdam Sand when it was recognized in Wicomico County, Maryland in 1955 by William C. Rasmussen and Turbit H. Slaughter. The name comes from Beaverdam Creek, the east branch of the Wicomico River. The Beaverdam Sand was renamed the Beaverdam Formation and given an expanded lithologic definition by Kelvin W. Ramsey and William S. Schenck in 1990.

== Microflora ==
The lower Beaverdam Formation is characterized by a Quercus-Carya pollen assemblage, very few non-arboreal pollen, and the exotic constituents Pterocarya and Sciadopitys. The upper Beaverdam has a very high non-arboreal pollen concentration, and the sole exotic constituent is Pterocarya. Other significant taxa include Cupuliferoidaepollenites fallax, Tricolporopollenites edmundii, and Tsuga diversifolia-type. The pollen assemblage of the lower Beaverdam is similar to that of the Bethany Formation in Delaware, the Brandywine Formation in Maryland, and the Eastover Formation in Virginia; and the pollen assemblage of the upper Beaverdam is similar to that of the Bacons Castle Formation in Virginia.

Group	Formation
Columbia Group	Omar Formation
Columbia Group	Beaverdam Formation
Chesapeake Group	Bethany Formation
Chesapeake Group	Manokin Formation
Chesapeake Group	St. Mary's Formation
Chesapeake Group	Choptank Formation
Chesapeake Group	Calvert Formation
Lithostratigraphic units of the Chesapeake and Columbia groups in southeastern Sussex County, Delaware.

== See also ==
- Geology of Delaware
- Geology of Maryland
- Atlantic coastal plain
