= Choptank Formation =

Fossiliferous geologic formation in Virginia and Maryland, U.S.

- Stratigraphic range: Middle Miocene (Langhian to Tortonian)
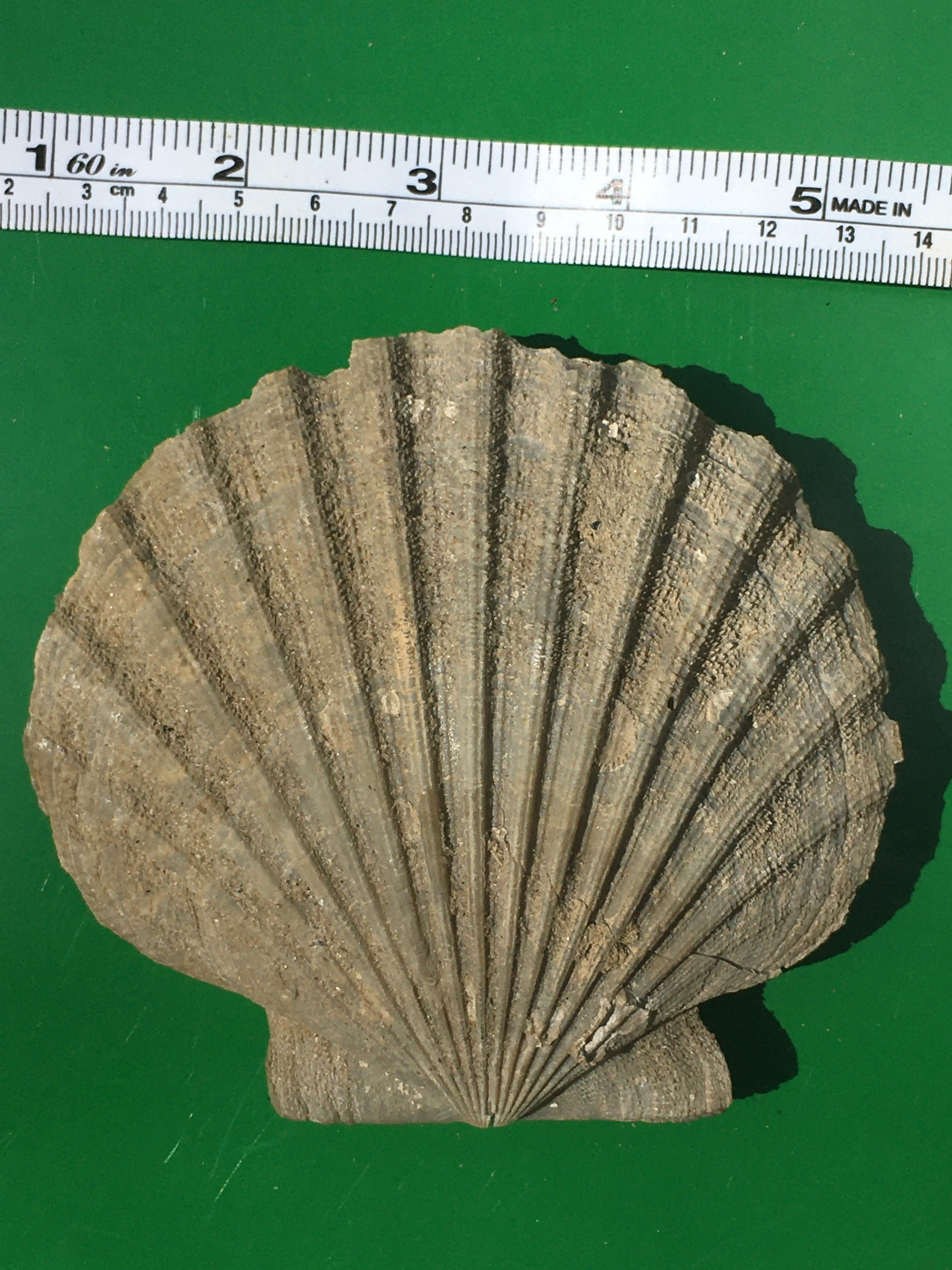
- Chesapecten nefrens, Choptank Formation
- Type: Formation
- Unit of: Chesapeake Group
- Underlies: St. Marys Formation
- Overlies: Calvert Formation

Location
- Region: Virginia, Maryland
- Country: United States

Type section
- Named for: Choptank River

The Choptank Formation is a geologic formation in Virginia and Maryland. It preserves fossils dating from the mid-late Miocene of the Neogene period, from the latest Langhian to the early Tortonian (13.9 to 11 million years ago).

== Fossils ==
The Choptank Formation is extremely fossiliferous. Some of the fossil species represented include the following:

=== Sharks ===
- Otodus megalodon
- Carcharodon hastalis
- Isurus oxyrhincus
- Carcharomodus escheri
- Physogaleus contortus
- Galeocerdo aduncus
- Carcharhinus
- Hemipristis serra
- Squatina sp.
- Notorhyncus cepedianus
- Carcharias
- Isurus retroflexus
- Parotodus benedeni
- Alopias vulpinus
- Alopias grandis
- Cetorhinus
- Negaprion brevirostris
- Rhizoprionodon
- Sphryna laevissima

=== Rays and Other Cartilaginous Fish ===
- Aetobatus arcuatus
- Pteromyaleus sp.
- Dasyatis rugosa
- Dasyatis probsti
- Pinthicus stenodon

=== Fish ===
- Acipenseridae indet.
- Opsanus sp.
- Serranidae indet
- Pogonias sp.
- Sciaenops sp.
- Tautoga sp.
- Acanthocybium cf. solandri
- Thunnus sp.
- Istiophorus cf. platypterus
- Mola cf. pileata
- Ariopsis aff. A. felis
- Trisopterus sculptus
- Micromesistius cognatus
- Prionotus

=== Cetaceans ===
- Aglaocetus sp.
- Cetotherium sp.
- Delphinodon sp.
- Eurhinodelphis sp.
- Macrokentriodon morani
- Mesocetus
- Parietobalaena
- Orycterocetus
- Pelocetus

=== Pinnipeds ===
- Callophoca obscura
- Leptophoca proxima
- Prophoca sp.

=== Crocodilians ===
- Thecachampsa antiquus
- Thecachampsa sericodon

=== Invertebrates ===
- Chesapecten nefrens
- Chesacardium
- Euspira heros
- Mariacolpus octonnaria
- Macrocallista marylandica
- Stewartia anodonta
- Marvacrassitella marylandica
- Ecphora
- Panopea
- Albertella aberti

=== Terrestrial Mammals ===
- Chesalophodon gulottai
- Cynarctus wangi
- Gomphotherium calvertensis
- Hipparion cf. phosphorum

== See also ==
- List of fossiliferous stratigraphic units in Virginia
- Paleontology in Virginia
- Paleontology in Maryland
- Calvert Cliffs State Park
- List of fossiliferous stratigraphic units in Maryland
- Chesapeake Group
