= St. Marys Formation =

Geologic formation in United States

- Stratigraphic range: Late Miocene (Tortonian)
- Type: Formation
- Unit of: Chesapeake Group
- Underlies: Eastover Formation
- Overlies: Choptank Formation

Location
- Region: Maryland, Virginia
- Country: United States

The St. Marys Formation is a geologic formation in Maryland and Virginia, United States. It preserves fossils dating back to the Tortonian stage of the Late Miocene epoch of the Neogene period (11 to 8 million years ago). It is the youngest Miocene formation present in the Calvert Cliffs and is part of the Chesapeake Group.

== Vertebrate paleofauna ==
A diverse vertebrate paleofauna is known from the St. Marys Formation:

Cartilaginous fish
Genus	Species	Notes	Tooth example	Ref.
Notorynchus	N. primigenius	This species is possibly synonymous with the broadnose sevengill shark.	Notorhynchus primigenius from the Calvert Formation	
Hexanchus	H. gigas	A species of cow shark. This species is extremely rare in this formation.	Hexanchus gigas teeth (not from St. Marys Formation)	
Squalus		Commonly known as the spurdog.		
Squatina		Commonly known as the angel shark.		
Rhincodon	R. typus	Commonly known as the whale shark. This species is extremely rare in this formation.	Modern Rhincodon typus teeth	
Carcharodon	C. hastalis	Putative ancestor to the extant great white shark	Carcharodon hastalis from the Calvert Formation	
Carcharomodus	C. escheri	Commonly known as Escher's mako. It is also known as Carcharodon subserratus and is sometimes placed in Isurus. It is extremely rare in this formation.	Carcharomodus escheri teeth from Germany	
Otodus	O. megalodon	This is the largest shark known to have existed.	C. megalodon from Chile	
Alopias	A. latidens	This species may be synonymous with the extant common thresher shark.	Alopias latidens from the Old Church Formation	
Mustelus		Commonly known as smooth-hounds		
Hemipristis	H. serra	Commonly known as the snaggletooth shark. It is related to the extant snaggletooth shark.	Hemipristis serra teeth (Bone Valley)	
Carcharhinus	C. falciformus	Commonly known as the silky shark.	Carcharhinus falciformis upper teeth (modern)	
Carcharhinus	C. leucas	Commonly known as the bull shark	Carcharhinus leucas teeth (modern)	
Carcharhinus	C. perezii	Commonly known as the Caribbean reef shark	Carcharhinus perezii upper teeth (modern)	
Carcharhinus	C. priscus	An extinct requiem shark		
Carcharhinus	C. plumbeus	Commonly known as the sandbar shark	Carcharhinus plumbeus upper teeth (modern)	
Negaprion	N. brevrostris	Commonly known as the lemon shark	Negaprion brevirostris upper teeth	
Rhizoprionodon		Commonly known as the sharpnose shark		
Pteromylaeus		Commonly known as the bull ray		
Aetobatus		Commonly known as the eagle ray		

Bony fish
Genus	Notes	Image	Ref.
Acipenseridae gen. indet.		Extant Japanese sturgeon (Acipenser schrenckii)	
Lepisosteus		Extant spotted gar (Lepisosteus oculatus)	
Amia	cf. A. calva	Extant Amia calva	
Alosa		Extant Alosa maeotica	
Ictalurus		Drawing of extant Ictalurus punctatus	
Merluccius		Drawing of extant Merluccius merluccius	
Belone	B. countermani	Extant Belona belona	
Prionotus		Extant bandtail searobin (Prionotus ophryas)	
Agonidae gen. indet.		Extant Agonus cataphractus	
"Paralbula"	"P." dorisiae		
Lagodon		Extant Lagodon rhomboides	
Stenotomus		Extant Stenotomus chrysops	
Pogonias		Extant black drum	
Sciaenops		Extant Sciaenops ocellatus	
Tautoga		Extant Tautoga onitis	
Astroscopus	A. countermani	Artists rendition of Astroscopus countermani	
Sphyraena		Extant school of Sphyraena barracuda	
Istiophoridae gen. indet.		Extant Atlantic blue marlin	

Reptiles
Genus	Species	Notes	Image	Ref.
Thecachampsa	T. antiquus	A Tomistominae	Thecachampsa sp. Vertebra possibly derived from this formation	

Sea mammals
Type	Genus	Species	Notes	Image	Ref.
Sirenians (sea cows)	Metaxytherium	M. floridanum		Metaxytherium floridanum skeleton	
Cetaceans (whales, dolphins and porpoises)	Aulophyseter	A. mediatlanticus	A sperm whale	Artists depiction of Aulophyseter	
Cetaceans (whales, dolphins and porpoises)	Lophocetus	L. calvertensis			
Cetaceans (whales, dolphins and porpoises)	Messapicetus			Messapicetus gregarius and M. longirostris skull diagrams	
Cetaceans (whales, dolphins and porpoises)	Stenasodelphis	S. russellae			

Terrestrial mammals
Name	Notes	Images	Ref.
Procamelus	cf. P. minor	Fossilized Procamelus mummy from Oklahoma	
Desmathyus			
Tapirus		Extant South American tapir (Tapirus terrestris)	
Neohipparion lenticulare		Skeleton and artists rendition of Neohipparion	
Equidae indet.	Larger than Parahippus		
Rhinoceratidae			
Cormohipparion		Cranium of Cormohipparion occidentale	

== See also ==
- List of fossiliferous stratigraphic units in Virginia
- Paleontology in Virginia
