= Calvert Formation =

Geologic formation in the United States

- Stratigraphic range: Early to Middle Miocene (Aquitanian-Langhian)
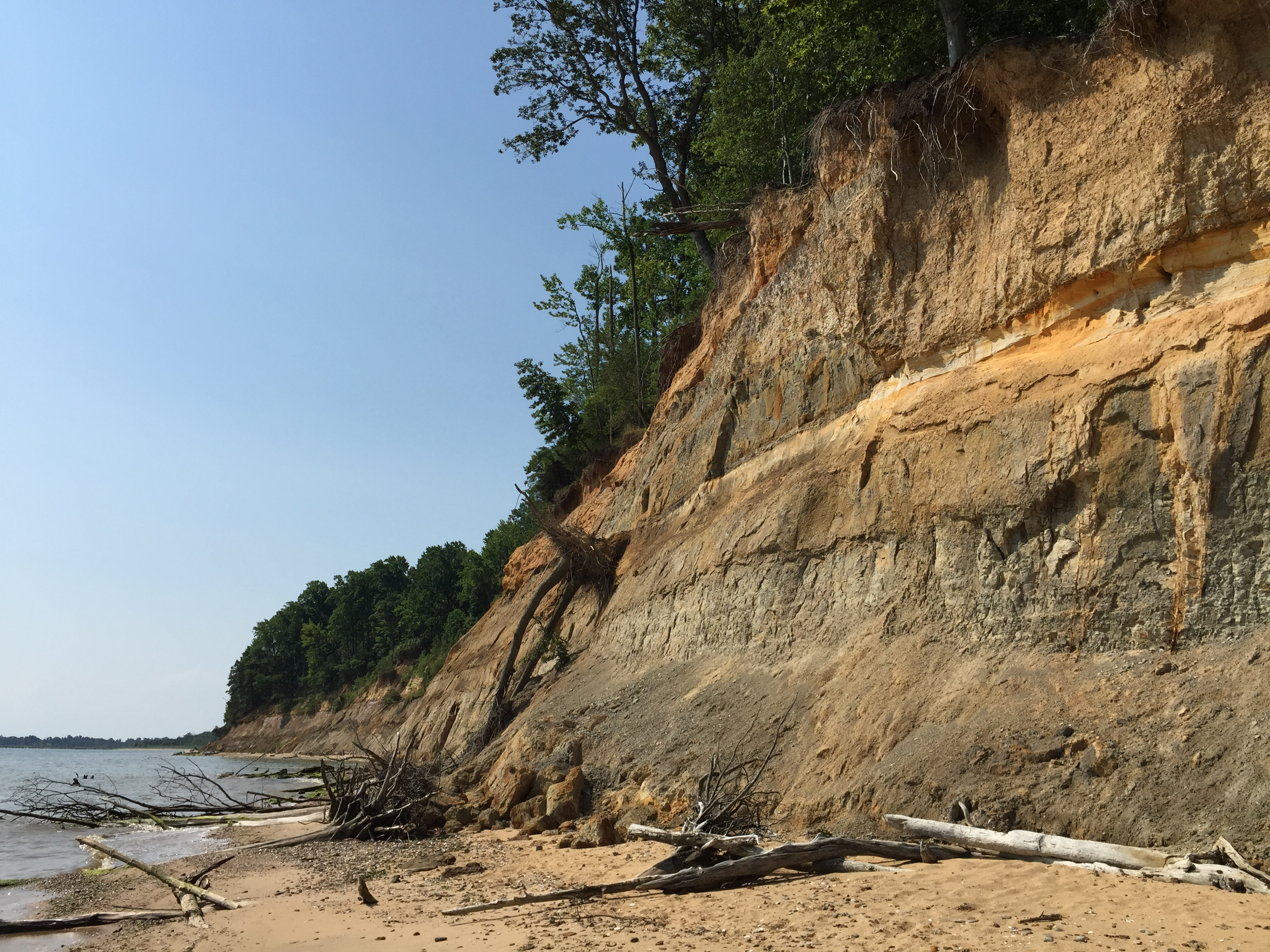
- Outcrops of the Calvert Formation at the Calvert Cliffs State Park
- Type: Formation
- Unit of: Chesapeake Group
- Underlies: Choptank Formation
- Overlies: Old Church Formation

Location
- Region: Maryland, Virginia, Delaware
- Country: United States

Type section
- Named for: Calvert County

The Calvert Formation is a geologic formation in Maryland, Virginia, and Delaware. It preserves fossils dating back to the early to middle Miocene epoch of the Neogene period, between 23 and 14 million years ago. It is one of the three formations which make up the Calvert Cliffs, all of which are part of the Chesapeake Group.

== Fossils ==
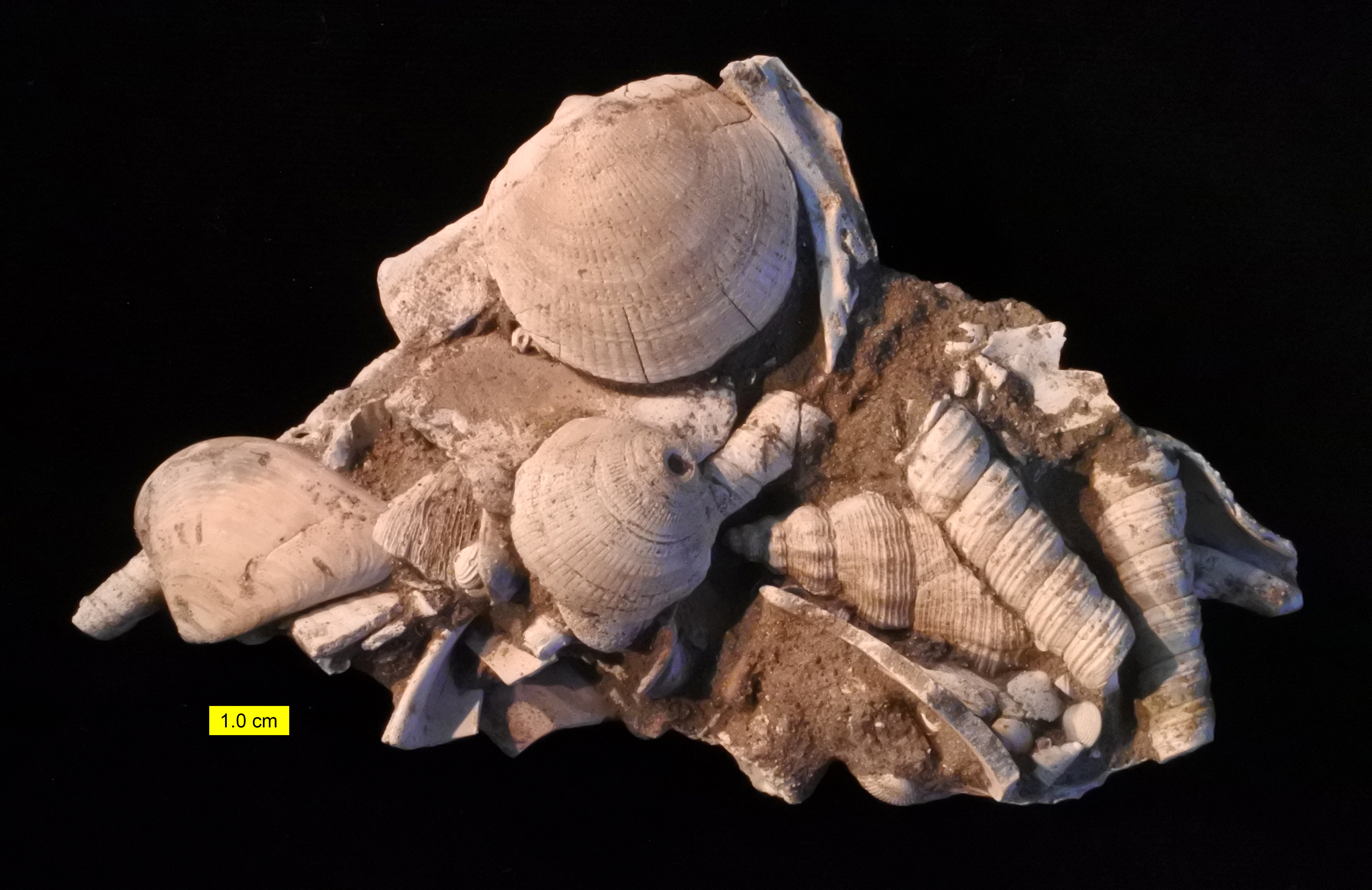
Fossils from the Calvert Formation, Zone 10, Calvert Co., MD (Miocene)

The Calvert Formation is extremely fossiliferous, although the most fossiliferous layers constitute a relative small section of it, dating to about 16 to 14.5 million years ago. Sediments under these layers are composed of either fine sand with few shells or (for the earliest layers) diatomite. Some of the fossil species represented include the following:

=== Chondrichthyes ===
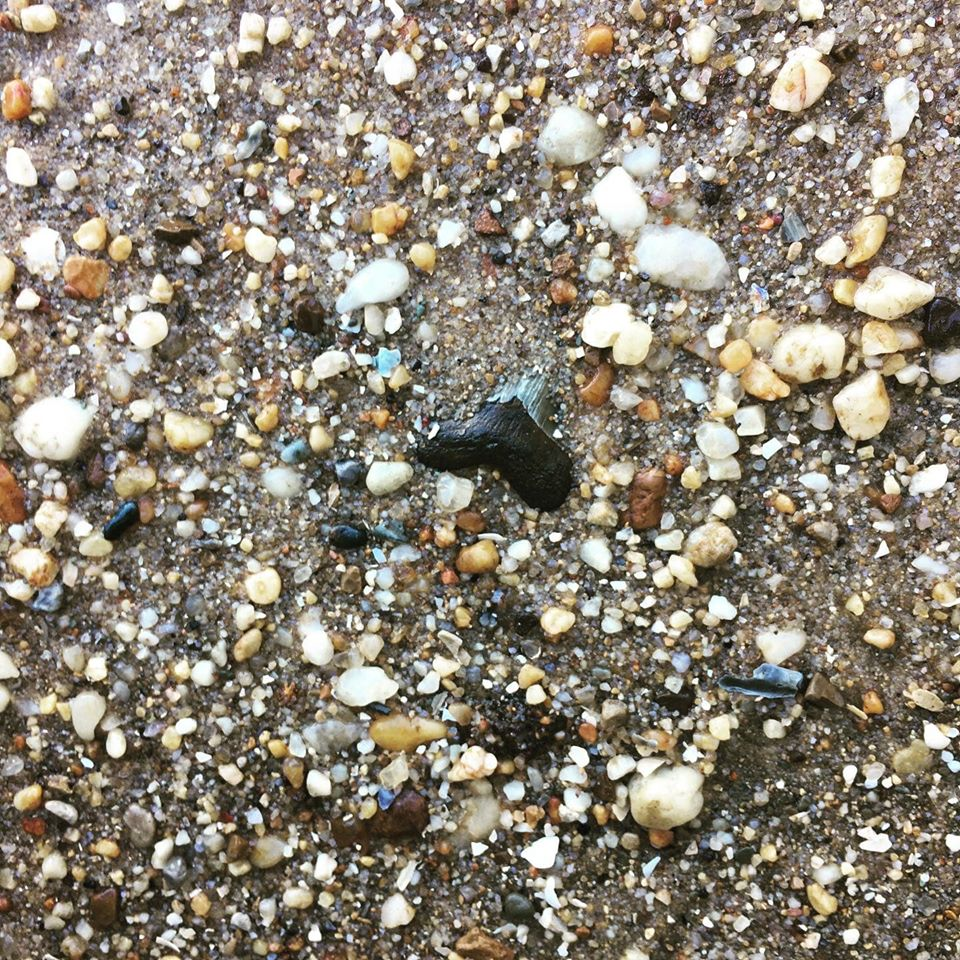
Carcharocles megalodon partially buried in gravel along the Calvert Cliffs, Maryland

==== Holocephalians ====
Genus	Species	Family	Location	Stratigraphic Position	Material	Notes	Images
Edaphodon	Edaphodon sp.	Callorhynchidae			two well preserved mandibular plates	Similar to E. sweeti	
Ischyodus	Ischyodus sp.	Callorhynchidae			many tooth fragments occasional mandibular plates		
Chimaera	Chimaera sp.	Chimaeridae					

==== Elasmobranchii ====
Genus	Species	Location	Family	Stratigraphic Position	Material	Notes	Images
Notorynchus	N. primigenius		Hexanchidae			Similar to extant N. cepedianus but differs in distribution.	
Hexanchus	H. gigas		Hexanchidae			Far less common then N. primigenus	
Echinorhinus	E. blakei		Echinorhinidae		Teeth and bramble thorns	One of the rarest sharks in the cliffs, prefers deeper waters	
Squalus	Squalus sp. 1 Squalus sp. 2		Squalidae		Very rare	Two forms of teeth, one (S. sp. 2) similar to Squalus acanthias	
Squatina	Squatina sp.		Squatinidae		Teeth and Dermal thorns		
Rhincodon	R. typus		Rhincodontidae			Very similar to modern R. typus	A living whale shark
Carcharias	C. cuspidatus C. taurus C. reticulatus		Odontaspididae				
Carcharoides	C. catticus		Lamnidae				
Isurus	I. oxyrinchus I. retroflexus		Lamnidae				Living Isurus oxyrinchus
Carcharodon	C. hastalis C. subserratus		Lamnidae				
Otodus	O. chubutensis O. megalodon		Otodontidae				
Parotodus	P. benedenii		incertae sedis				
Alopias	A. cf. vulpinus A. cf. superciliosus A. grandis		Alopiidae			A second large species of Alopias is known from teeth with larger and coarser serrated cutting edges then A. grandis	
Cetorhinus	Cetorhinus sp.		Cetorhinidae		Known exclusively from vertebral centra	Two species C. parvus and C. maximus are known from the time making identification difficult	
Scyliorhinidae sp.			Scyliorhinidae				
Mustelus	Mustelus sp.		Triakidae			A smooth-hound shark	
Hemipristis	H. serra		Hemigaleidae		Teeth and vertebra, a partial skeleton is held in private collection	Teeth where found in association with a Squalodon skeleton, possibly from predation or scavenging	Reconstructed fossil jaw of the shark Hemipristis serra, Florida Museum of Natural History
Galeocerdo	Galeocerdo aduncus		Galeocerdonidae			Teeth have two morphologies and it is unclear whether this is because of sexual dimorphism or both are produced by the same individuals	
Physogaleus	P. hemmooriensis						
Carcharhinus	C. cf. altimus C. falciformis C. leucas C. macloti C. perezii C. priscus C. plumbeus		Carcharhinidae		Teeth distinctive to each species and indeterminate vertebral remains	C. cf. altimus is known from teeth similar to modern bignose shark Teeth from C. falciformis have been found in association with Squalidon remains C. leucas teeth from the Calvert cliffs reach a maximum height of 18mm smaller then modern examples of the species	
Negaprion	N. eurybathrodon		Carcharhinidae			A lemon shark	
Rhizoprionodon	R. sp		Carcharhinidae			Formerly assigned to R. ficheuri due to similarity of teeth but due to high endemism in modern genus this is probably not the case	
Sphyrna	Sphyrna laevissima					An early hammerhead	

===== Rays and other cartilaginous fish =====
- Mobula pectinata
- Mobula fragilis
- Mobula loupianensis
- Plinthicus stenodon
- Rhinoptera cf. R. studeri
- Aetobatus arcuatus
- Pteromylaeus sp.
- Dasyatis probsti
- Dasyatis rugosa
- Pristis sp.

=== Bony fish ===
- Acipenseridae indet.
- Bagre sp.
- Brotula sp.
- Pogonias sp.
- Sciaenops sp.
- Tautoga sp.
- Acanthocybium cf. solandri
- Thunnus sp.
- Istiophorus cf. platypterus
- Ranzania grahami
- Ranzania tenneyorum
- Ariopsis stauroforus
- Trisopterus sculptus
- Micromesistius cognatus
- Prionotus
- Lophius sp.
- Paralbula dorisiae
- Morone
- Lophokatilus ereboorensis
- Rachycentron sp.
- Pomatomus sp.
- Lagodon sp.
- Micropogonias sp.
- Sphyraena sp.
- Sarda sp.
- Makaira cf. nigricans
- Chilomycterus sp.

=== Mammals ===
==== Afrotheria ====
Genus	Species	Family	Location	Stratigraphic Position	Material	Notes	Images
Gomphotherium	G. calvertense	Gomphotheridae		Plum Point		Gomphotherium sp may be known from the Fairhaven member	
Metaxytherium	M. crataegense	Dugongidae					M. crataegense skull
Nanosiren	N. sp	Dugongidae		Plum Point			
Corystosiren	Aff. C. sp.	Dugongidae		Lower Calvert			

- Cynarctus marylandica
- Tomarctus brevirostris
- Gomphotherium calvertensis
- Hipparion cf. phosphorum
- Amphicyon cf. frendens
- Amphicyon intermedius
- Aphelops sp.
- Archaeohippus cf. blackbergi

=== Cetaceans ===
- Atlanticetus patulus
- Squalodon calvertensis
- Eurhinodelphis sp.
- Parietobalaena palmeri
- Eobalaenoptera harrisoni
- Cephalotrophis coronatus
- Araeodelphis
- Cetotherium
- Zarhachis flagellator
- Pelocetus
- Xiphiacetus

=== Pinnipeds ===
- Callophoca obscura
- Leptophoca

=== Crocodilians ===
- Thecachampsa antiquus
- Thecachampsa sericodon

=== Invertebrates ===
- Chesapecten nefrens
- Chesapecten coccymelus
- Isognomon sp.
- Ecphora
- Architectonica trilineata

=== Birds ===
- Mergus miscellus
- Morus loxostylus
- Calonectris kurodai
- Heliadornis ashbyi
- Miocepphus
- Pelagornis

== See also ==
- List of fossiliferous stratigraphic units in Virginia
- Paleontology in Virginia
- Paleontology in Maryland
- Calvert Cliffs State Park
- List of fossiliferous stratigraphic units in Maryland
- Chesapeake Group
