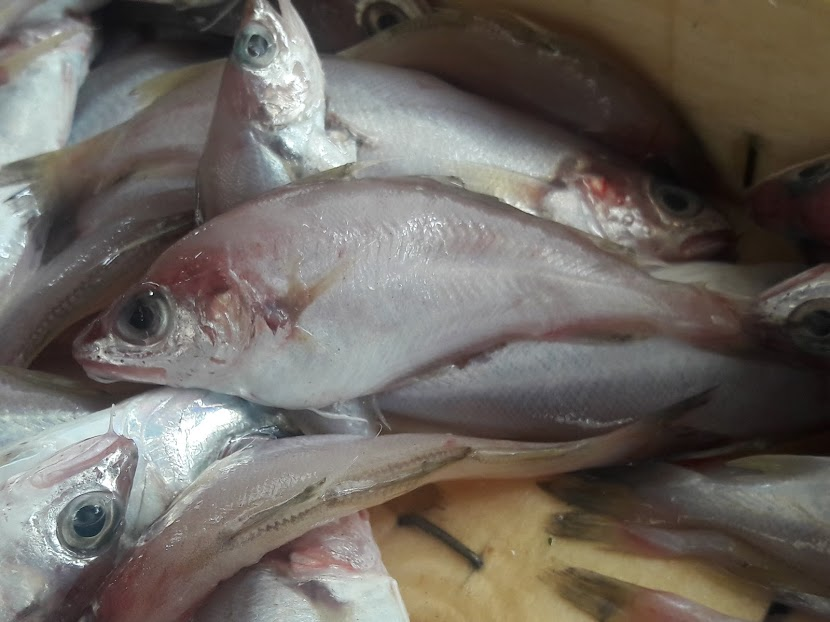

Conservation status
- Least Concern (IUCN 3.1)

Scientific classification
- Kingdom: Animalia
- Phylum: Chordata
- Class: Actinopterygii
- Division: Teleostei
- Order: Gadiformes
- Family: Gadidae
- Genus: Trisopterus
- Species: T. capelanus

Binomial name
- Trisopterus capelanus (Lacépède, 1800)

Synonyms
- Gadus capelanus (Lacepède, 1800)

= Trisopterus capelanus =

Species of fish

Trisopterus capelanus is a fish species belonging to the cod family (Gadidae). It is found in the Mediterranean Sea.

The taxonomic status of Trisopterus capelanus has until recently been unclear, and it has been mostly considered to be a subspecies of Trisopterus minutus. However, genetic and morphometric analyses clearly support the status of Trisopterus capelanus as a separate species. In fact, Trisopterus capelanus is more closely related to Trisopterus luscus than to T. minutus.

The neotype of Trisopterus capelanus is 21 cm (8.3 in) in standard length and 23 cm (9.1 in) in total length.
