= Beaverdam Formation =

Beaverdam Formation may refer to the following geological formations in the United States:

- Beaverdam Formation (Delmarva) in Delaware and Maryland
- Beaverdam Formation (Idaho)
