= Feducciavis =

Feducciavis Temporal range: Middle Miocene

Scientific classification
- Kingdom: Animalia
- Phylum: Chordata
- Class: Aves
- Order: Charadriiformes
- Family: Laridae
- Subfamily: Sterninae
- Genus: †Feducciavis
- Species: †F. loftini

Binomial name
- †Feducciavis loftini Olson, 2011

Extinct genus of birds

Feducciavis is an extinct genus of sterninae that lived during the Middle Miocene.

== Distribution ==
Feducciavis loftini fossils are known from the Calvert Formation of Maryland.
