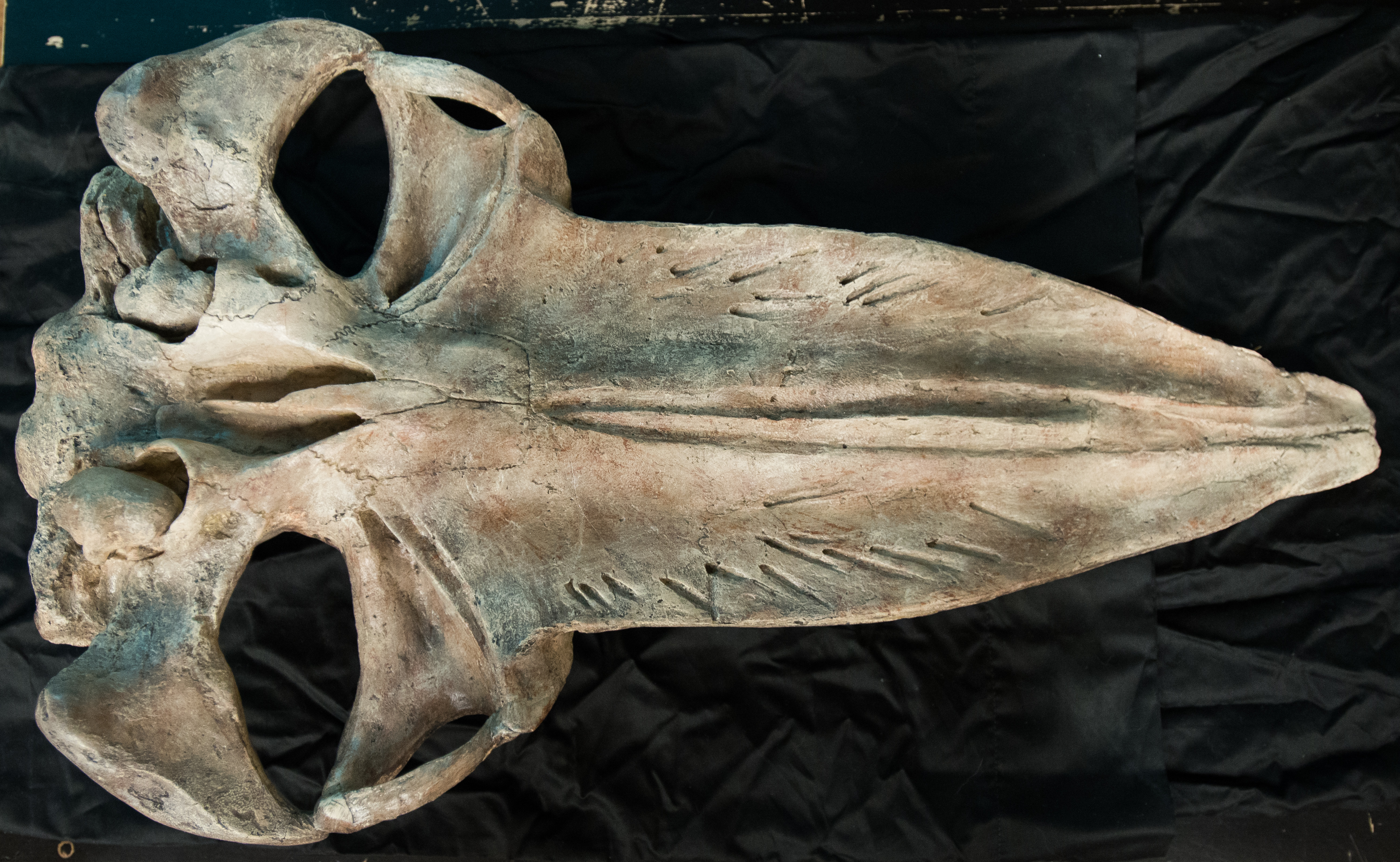
- Restored skull of a juvenile D. hiatus

Scientific classification
- Kingdom: Animalia
- Phylum: Chordata
- Class: Mammalia
- Order: Artiodactyla
- Infraorder: Cetacea
- Family: †Pelocetidae
- Genus: †Diorocetus; Kellogg, 1968

Species
- D. chichibuensis; D. hiatus; D. shobarensis

= Diorocetus =

Diorocetus Temporal range: Miocene

Extinct genus of mammals

Diorocetus is an extinct genus of baleen whale, belonging to the family Diorocetidae. Fossils are found in Miocene-aged marine strata in North America and Japan.

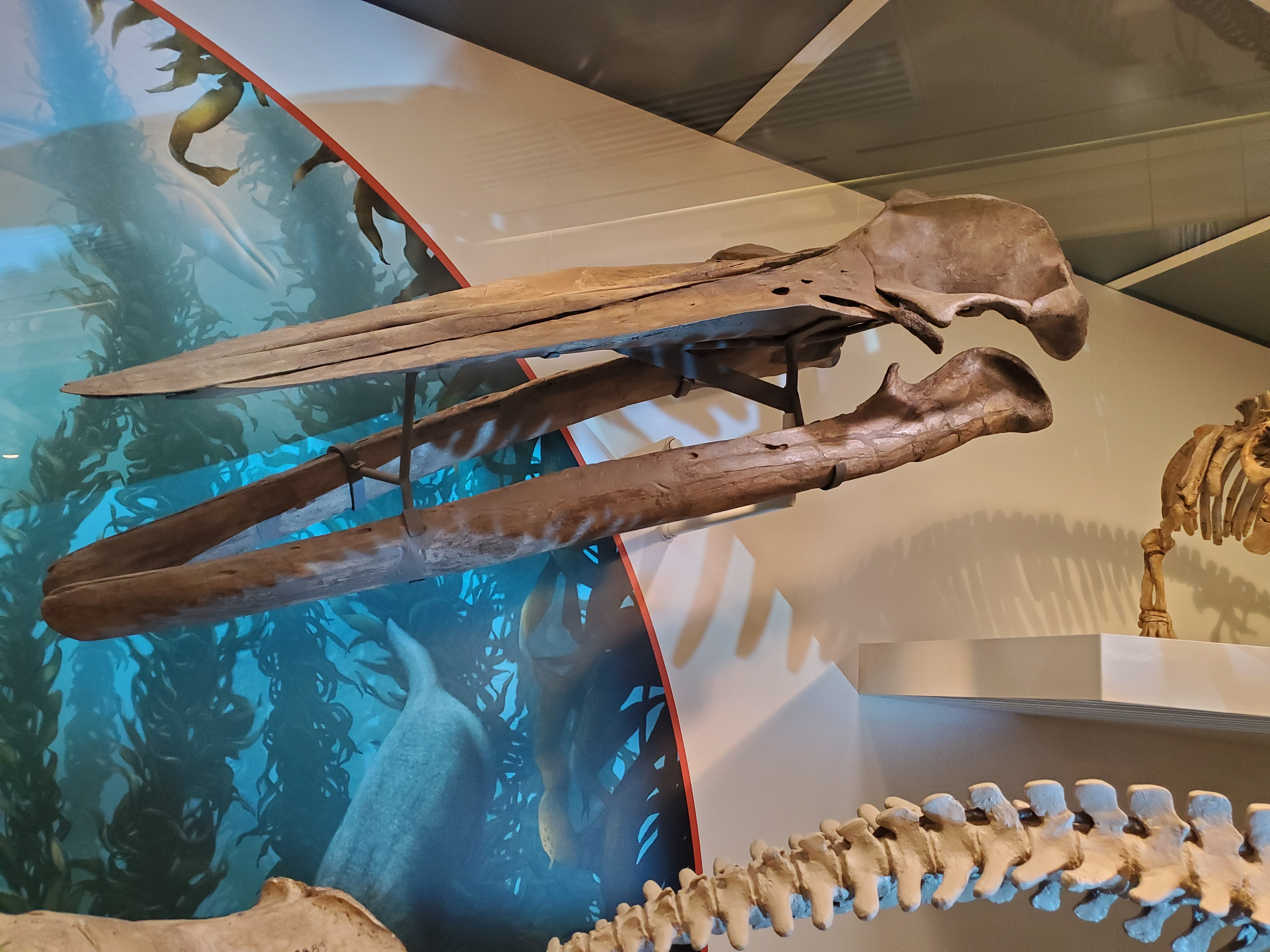
Diorocetus hiatus skull
