= Calvert Cliffs =

Calvert Cliffs may refer to the following, in Calvert County, Maryland, United States:

- the costline of cliffs in Chesapeake Bay
- Calvert Cliffs Nuclear Power Plant
- Calvert Cliffs State Park
