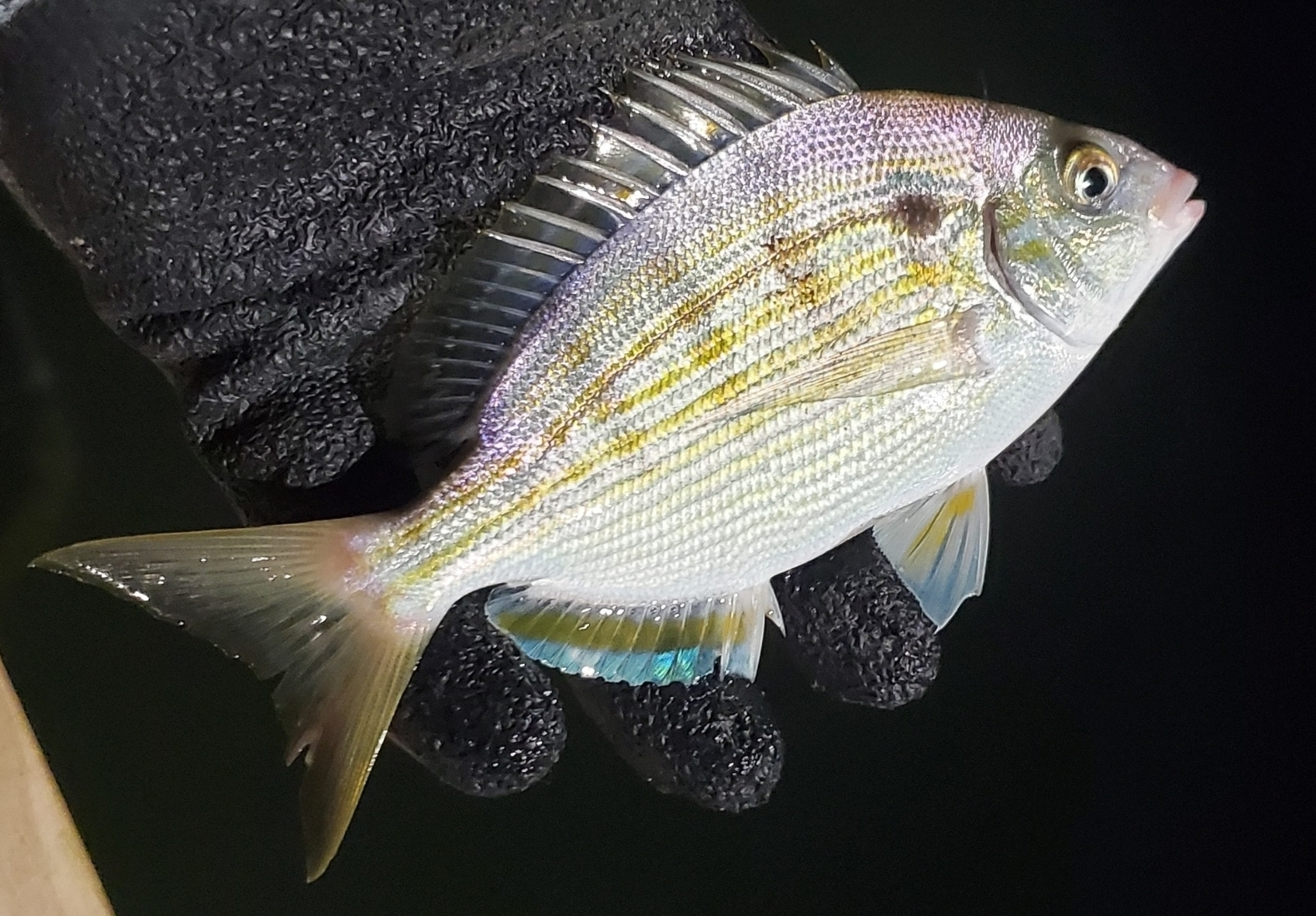
- In North Carolina

Conservation status
- Least Concern (IUCN 3.1)

Scientific classification
- Kingdom: Animalia
- Phylum: Chordata
- Class: Actinopterygii
- Division: Teleostei
- Order: Acanthuriformes
- Family: Sparidae
- Genus: Lagodon; Holbrook, 1855
- Species: L. rhomboides

Binomial name
- Lagodon rhomboides (Linnaeus, 1766)

Synonyms
- Sparus rhomboides Linnaeus, 1766

= Lagodon =

Lagodon Temporal range: Late Oligocene to present 25–0 Ma

Species of fish

Lagodon is a monospecific genus of marine ray-finned fish belonging to the family Sparidae, which includes the seabreams and porgies. The only species in the genus is Lagodon rhomboides, the pinfish, red porgy, bream, pin perch, sand perch, butterfish or sailor's choice. This fish is found in the Western Atlantic Ocean and Gulf of Mexico.

== Taxonomy ==
Lagodon was first proposed as a genus in 1855 by the American zoologist John Edwards Holbrook with Sparus rhomboides as its only species. Sparus rhomboides was first formally described in 1766 by Carl Linnaeus in the Systema naturae sive regna tria naturae giving the type locality as "America", although it is considered to be North Carolina. In 1940 Henry Weed Fowler described a new species, Salema atkinsoni, the type having been caught off Cape May, New Jersey which he placed in a subgenus of Salema he named Sphenosargus. This taxon is now regarded as a junior synonym of L. rhomboides.

This taxon is placed in the family Sparidae within the order Spariformes by the fifth edition of Fishes of the World. Some authorities classify this genus in the subfamily Boopsinae, but the fifth edition of Fishes of the World does not recognise subfamilies within the Sparidae.

=== Fossil record ===
Fossil remains of Lagodon date back to the latest Oligocene or earliest Miocene, from the Belgrade Formation of North Carolina. They are also known from the early-mid Miocene-aged Pungo River Formation of North Carolina, the mid-late Miocene-aged St. Marys Formation and Choptank Formation of Maryland & Virginia, the mid-late Miocene-aged Alachua Formation of Florida, the late Miocene-aged Eastover Formation of Virginia, the Early Pliocene-aged Yorktown Formation of North Carolina, and the Early Pleistocene-aged Bermont Formation of Florida. This suggests a long presence of this genus on the Atlantic Coast of North America.

== Etymology ==
Lagodon combines lagus, meaning "hare" or "rabbit", with odon, which means "tooth", this is thought to be a reference to the eight wide, deeply notched incisor-like teeth at the front of each jaw. The specific name rhomboides means "in the form of a rhombus", presumed to be a reference to the shape of the scales in the illustration of two seabreams called Perca marina rhomboidalis fasciata drawn by Mark Catesby published in 1754.

Common names include pinfish, choffer, pin perch, and butterfish. The name "Choffer" is a very limited regional moniker around Panama City that ends somewhere between Destin & Pensacola.

== Distribution and habitat ==
In Florida

Lagodon is found in Bermuda and along the United States coast from Massachusetts to Texas, and down along the Mexican Gulf Coast. It is also found along the northern Yucatán coast and near some northern Caribbean islands, but it is less common in the tropical portions of its range.

The adult pinfish prefers waters between 30 and 50 feet deep, while the juvenile is more common where there is some cover, such as seagrass beds, rocky bottoms, jetties, pilings, and mangroves. It prefers higher-salinity water. It rarely schools, but it associates with other individuals, especially where food items such as barnacles are abundant.

== Description ==
In Florida

The pinfish has a maximum published total length of 40 cm (16 in), although 18 cm (7.1 in) is more typical, and a maximum published weight of 1.5 kg (3.3 lb). It has a moderately deep and compressed oval-shaped body with a small mouth and moderately large eyes. The dorsal profile of the head is steep and leads to a sharp snout. The teeth in the front of the mouth are small and incisor-like and point outwards. There are 12 dorsal fin spines; the first spine is small and points forward and gives this fish its common name of pinfish, and 10 dorsal fin rays. The anal fin has three spines and 11 soft rays.

This species has an olive back, shading to bluish-silver on the flanks marked with slender yellow and blue horizontal stripes and five or six dark, poorly defined, vertical bars also on the flank. The fins are pale yellow with wide, pale blue edges. There is an obvious black spot on the shoulder, to the rear of the operculum.

== Biology ==
The pinfish is prey for alligator gar, longnose gar, ladyfish, spotted sea trout, red drum, southern flounder, pelicans, grouper, cobia, snook and bottlenose dolphins.

=== Diet ===
Lagodon undergoes ontogenetic changes in the morphology of their dentition and gut tracts which affect diet throughout their life history. Juvenile pinfish are carnivorous and primarily eat shrimp, fish eggs, insect larvae, polychaete worms, and amphipods. As pinfish become older and larger they become increasingly more herbivorous, with plant matter comprising >90% of the diet for pinfish greater than 100mm.

=== Reproduction ===
Lagodon reaches sexual maturity at about one year, when the fish is 80 to 100 mm in length. Spawning season is in the fall and winter. Eggs are broadcast in the water by the female, then fertilized by the male. The number of eggs varies from 7,000 to 90,000. They hatch after about 48 hours. Larvae are not protected by adults. The larval stage ends when the fish is about 12 mm in length, and the juvenile reaches maturity when it is about 80 mm. Because this species is eaten by many other animals, its life span is generally short.

== Commercial and recreational significance ==
In Florida

Lagodon is not generally sought as sport or food in the United States due to its small size and numerous small bones. It is often used as live bait by anglers targeting tarpon, red drum, spotted sea trout, and flounder. Because it is generally considered a nuisance bait-stealer, anglers opt to catch Lagodon in traps in order to improve the efficiency and gather more live bait quickly.

The famous naturalist, Edward O. Wilson, lost the vision in his right eye at the age of seven, when he caught a pinfish and it flew up and struck him in the face.
