= Old Church Formation =

Geologic formation in Virginia, U.S.

- Stratigraphic range: Oligocene
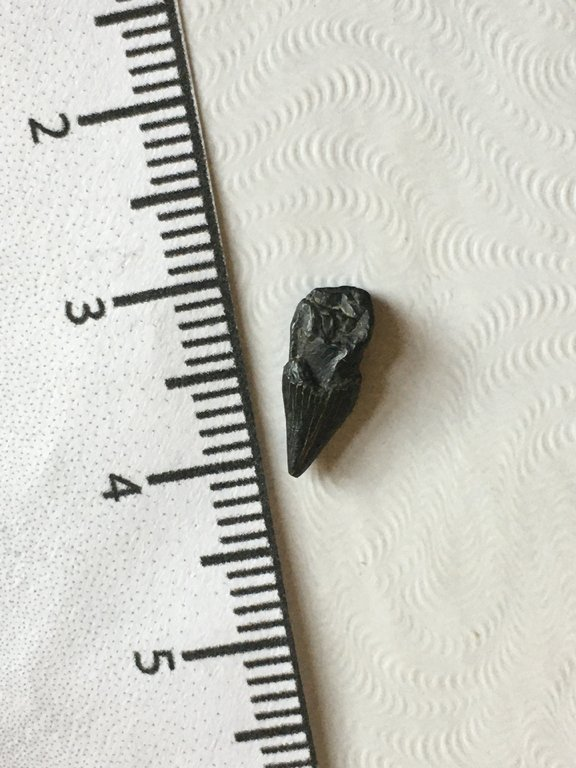
- Xenorophid(?) Cetacean tooth from the Old Church formation of Virginia
- Type: Formation
- Unit of: Chesapeake Group
- Underlies: Calvert Formation, Popes Creek Sand
- Overlies: Pamunkey Group, Piney Point Formation

Location
- Region: Virginia
- Country: United States

The Old Church Formation is a geologic formation in Virginia and possibly Maryland. It preserves fossils dating back to the Oligocene epoch of the Paleogene period. It rarely exposes on land and is under-studied. However, deposits from this period are rare and the Old Church Formation likely contains many scientifically significant taxa.

== Species ==
Some of the species known from the Old Church Formation are included below. Further study will likely reveal a more diverse fauna.

=== Chondrichthyans ===
- Otodus angustidens
- Hemipristis serra
- Alopias vulpinus
- Squatina prima?

=== Cetaceans ===
- Xenorophidae sp.
- Micromysticetus sp.
- cf. Ankylorhiza sp.
- cf. Xenorophus sloani
- aff. Coronodon sp.
- aff. Cotylocara sp. and Echovenator sp.
- aff. Eosqualodon sp.

=== Chelonians ===
- Procolpochelys charlestonensis
- Carolinochelys wilsoni
- Ashleychelys palmeri

=== Invertebrates ===
- Mercenaria gardnerae
- Anomia ruffini
- "Pectin" seabeensis
- "Pectin" sp.
- Lucina sp.
- Plicatula sp.
- Epitonium sp.
- Panopea sp.
- Cyclocardia sp.
- Astarte sp.
- Pycnodonte sp.
- Isognomon sp.
- "Cardium" sp.
- Bicorbula idonea
- Macrocallista sp.
- Diadora sp.
- Ecphora sp.
- Trophon sp.
- Calypttaea sp.

== See also ==
- List of fossiliferous stratigraphic units in Virginia
- Paleontology in Virginia
