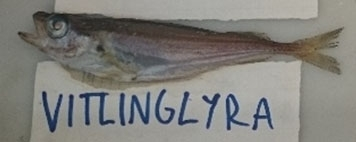

Conservation status
- Least Concern (IUCN 3.1)

Scientific classification
- Kingdom: Animalia
- Phylum: Chordata
- Class: Actinopterygii
- Order: Gadiformes
- Family: Gadidae
- Genus: Trisopterus
- Species: T. esmarkii

Binomial name
- Trisopterus esmarkii Nilsson, 1855

Synonyms
- Gadus esmarkii

= Trisopterus esmarkii =

Norway pout

Species of fish

Trisopterus esmarkii, the Norway pout, is a species of fish in the cod family. It is found in the Barents Sea, North Sea, Baltic Sea, off the coasts of Norway, Iceland, the British Isles and elsewhere in the northeast Atlantic Ocean. It prefers depths between 100 and 200 m (330–660 ft), but occurs from 50 to 300 m (160–980 ft). Norway pout can reach 35 cm (14 in), but are more common at around 19 cm (7.5 in).

It is extensively fished, mostly for conversion into fishmeal, with 877,910 t taken in 1974, and only 39,223 t taken in 2008.
