= Chesapeake Group =

Fossiliferous geologic group in the eastern U.S.

- Stratigraphic range: Neogene
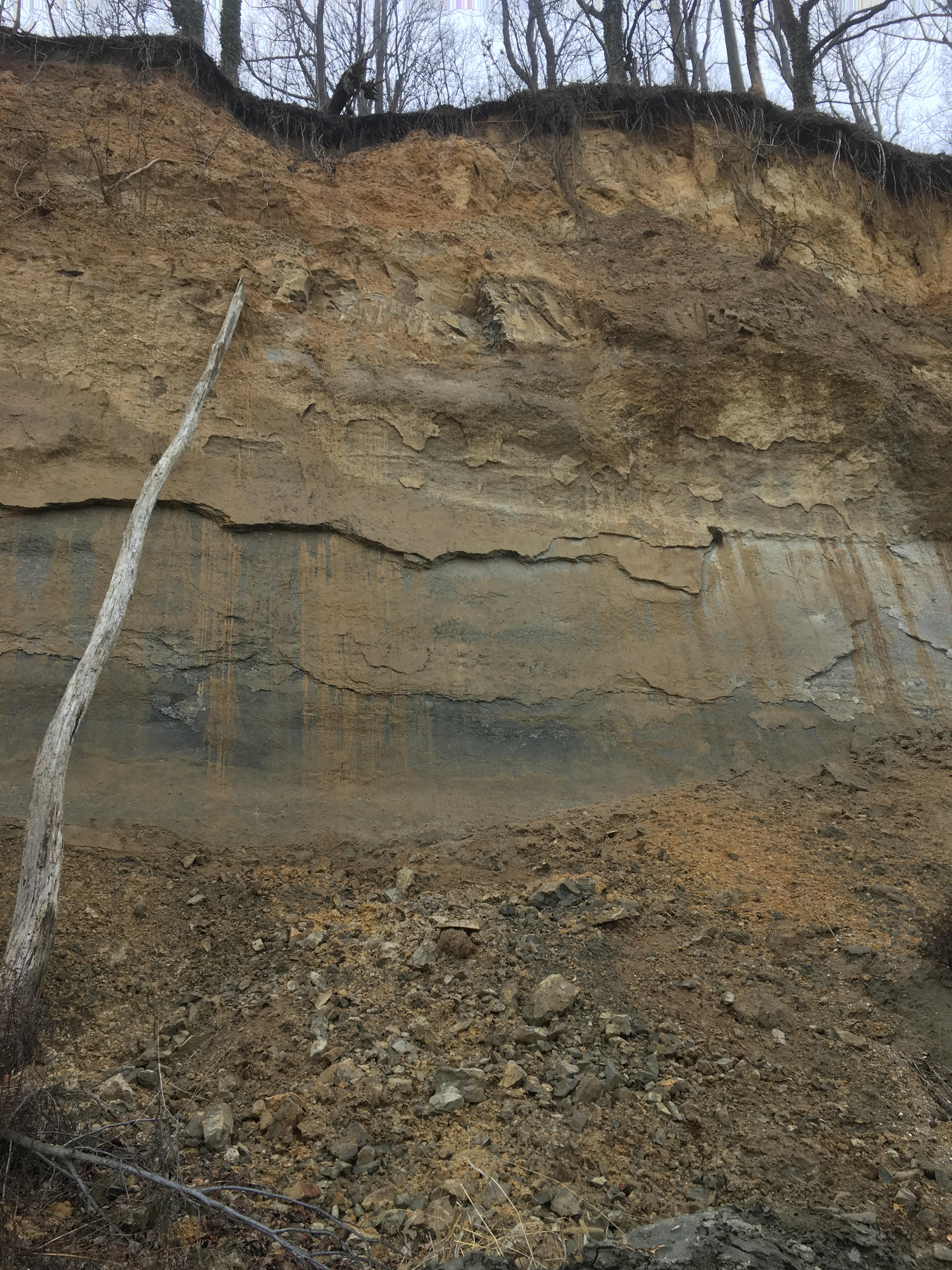
- Calvert Formation Exposed at Brownies Beach
- Type: Group
- Sub-units: Old Church Formation, Calvert Formation, Choptank Formation, St. Marys Formation, Eastover Formation, Yorktown Formation, and Chowan River Formation

Location
- Region: Maryland, Virginia, Delaware, North Carolina
- Country: United States

The Chesapeake Group is a geologic group in Maryland, Virginia, Delaware, and North Carolina. It preserves mainly marine fossils dating back to the Late Oligocene through the Pliocene epochs of the Neogene period. This group contains one of the best studied fossil record of Neogene oceans in the world. Professional Paleontologists and amateur fossil hunters alike collect from this group intensely. The Calvert Cliffs stretch the length of Calvert County, Maryland and provide the best continuous stretch of the Calvert, Choptank, and St. Marys Formations. Ward (1985) recommended including the Old Church Formation in this group.

== See also ==
- List of fossiliferous stratigraphic units in North Carolina
- List of fossiliferous stratigraphic units in Maryland
- List of fossiliferous stratigraphic units in Delaware
- List of fossiliferous stratigraphic units in Virginia
