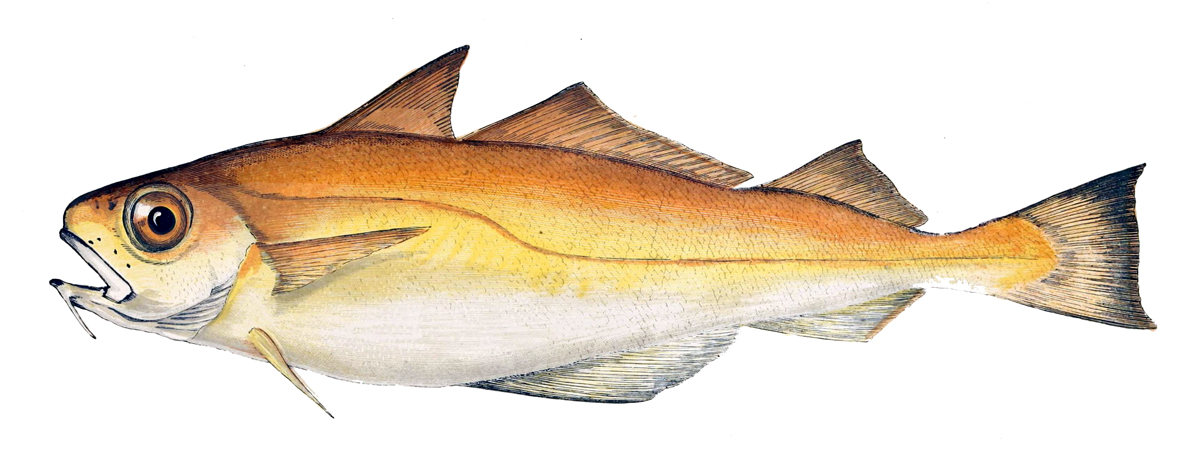

Conservation status
- Least Concern (IUCN 3.1)

Scientific classification
- Kingdom: Animalia
- Phylum: Chordata
- Class: Actinopterygii
- Division: Teleostei
- Order: Gadiformes
- Family: Gadidae
- Genus: Trisopterus
- Species: T. minutus

Binomial name
- Trisopterus minutus (Linnaeus, 1758)

Synonyms
- Gadus minutus Linnaeus, 1758; Brachygadus minutus (Linnaeus, 1758); Gadulus minutus (Linnaeus, 1758); Gadus tacaud Lacépède, 1800; Morua capelanus Risso, 1827

= Poor cod =

Species of fish

The poor cod (Trisopterus minutus) is a temperate marine fish belonging to the cod family (Gadidae). It is red brown in colour and has a pronounced chin barbel. It may grow up to a length of 40 cm (16 in). It is usually found in small shoals at depths between 10 and 300 feet (3 and 91 m) over muddy or sandy bottoms. Its distribution spans the eastern Atlantic, from Norwegian coasts to Portugal and along the Atlantic coast of Morocco. Spawning takes place towards the end of winter. They are often regarded as a mini species and are commonly confused with pouting as they have a similar appearance. They are often seen as a menace for anglers and have little commercial value and so are not currently at any risk of extinction.

They feed on crustaceans, small fish and marine worms. They are eaten by seals, dolphins and larger fish. It is commercially harvested for the production of fish meal, and in southern Europe as food.
