= Cophocetus =

Cophocetus Temporal range: Miocene, 16–11.6 Ma

Scientific classification
- Kingdom: Animalia
- Phylum: Chordata
- Class: Mammalia
- Order: Artiodactyla
- Infraorder: Cetacea
- Family: †Pelocetidae
- Genus: †Cophocetus; Packard and Kellogg, 1934

Species
- C. oregonensis (type) Packard and Kellogg, 1934

Extinct genus of mammals

Cophocetus is an extinct monotypic genus of baleen whale known from Miocene-aged marine strata in Oregon, North America.

Together with its type species C. oregonensis, it was described in 1934 by Earl Leroy Packard and Remington Kellogg.

== See also ==
- Paleontology in Oregon
