= Virginiaphoca =

Virginiaphoca Temporal range: Late Miocene (Messinian)

Scientific classification
- Kingdom: Animalia
- Phylum: Chordata
- Class: Mammalia
- Infraclass: Placentalia
- Order: Carnivora
- Parvorder: Pinnipedia
- Family: Phocidae
- Subfamily: Monachinae
- Genus: †Virginiaphoca; Dewaele et al., 2018
- Species: †V. magurai

Binomial name
- †Virginiaphoca magurai Dewaele et al., 2018

Extinct genus of monachine phocid

Virginiaphoca is an extinct genus of monachine phocid known from the Eastover Formation of Virginia, US during the Late Miocene period. It contains a single species, V. magurai.
