= Calvert Cliffs State Park =

State park in Maryland, United States

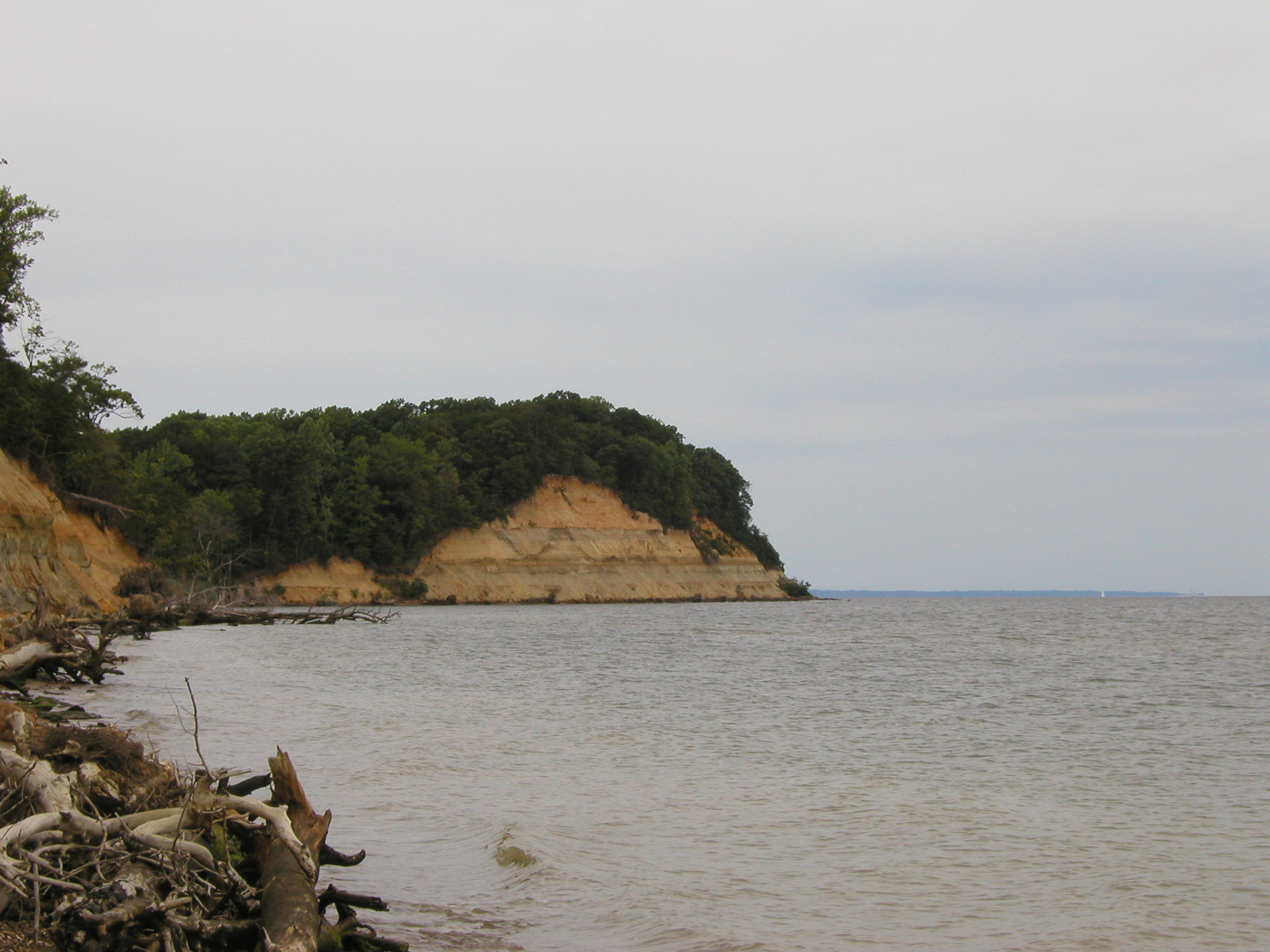
- The park's namesake cliffs

- Location within Maryland
- Location: Calvert County, Maryland, United States
- Nearest city: Lusby, Maryland
- Coordinates: 38°24′10″N 76°25′19″W
- Area: 1,311 acres (531 ha)
- Elevation: 112 ft (34 m)
- Established: 1960s
- Administrator: Maryland Department of Natural Resources
- Designation: Maryland state park
- Website: Official website

Calvert Cliffs State Park is a Maryland state park in Lusby, Calvert County, Maryland, that protects a portion of the cliffs that extend for 24 miles along the eastern flank of the Calvert Peninsula on the west side of the Chesapeake Bay from Chesapeake Beach southward to Drum Point. The state park is known for the abundance of mainly Middle Miocene sub-epoch fossils that can be found on the shoreline.

== Natural history ==
=== Geology ===
The park contains the type locality site of the Early to Middle Miocene Calvert Formation. These rocks are the sediment from a coastal ocean that covered the area during that time. The age of the formation is (19-)18–15(-14) million years ago (Ma), i.e. it extends essentially over the Hemingfordian stage. This formation occurs in Maryland and neighboring Virginia. The cliffs are between 66–131 feet (20–40 m) high and extend for 25 miles (40 km) along the coast.

In addition, rocks of the younger Choptank and the St. Marys Formations are exposed here. This makes Calvert Cliffs State Park extremely interesting for its paleoclimatology and paleontology, because the accessible strata provide a good record of the Middle Miocene Climate Transition and document a minor mass extinction event — the "Middle Miocene disruption." Fossil collecting and "rockhounding" are permitted on the beach; the cliffs are closed due to the dangers of erosion.

=== Paleontology ===
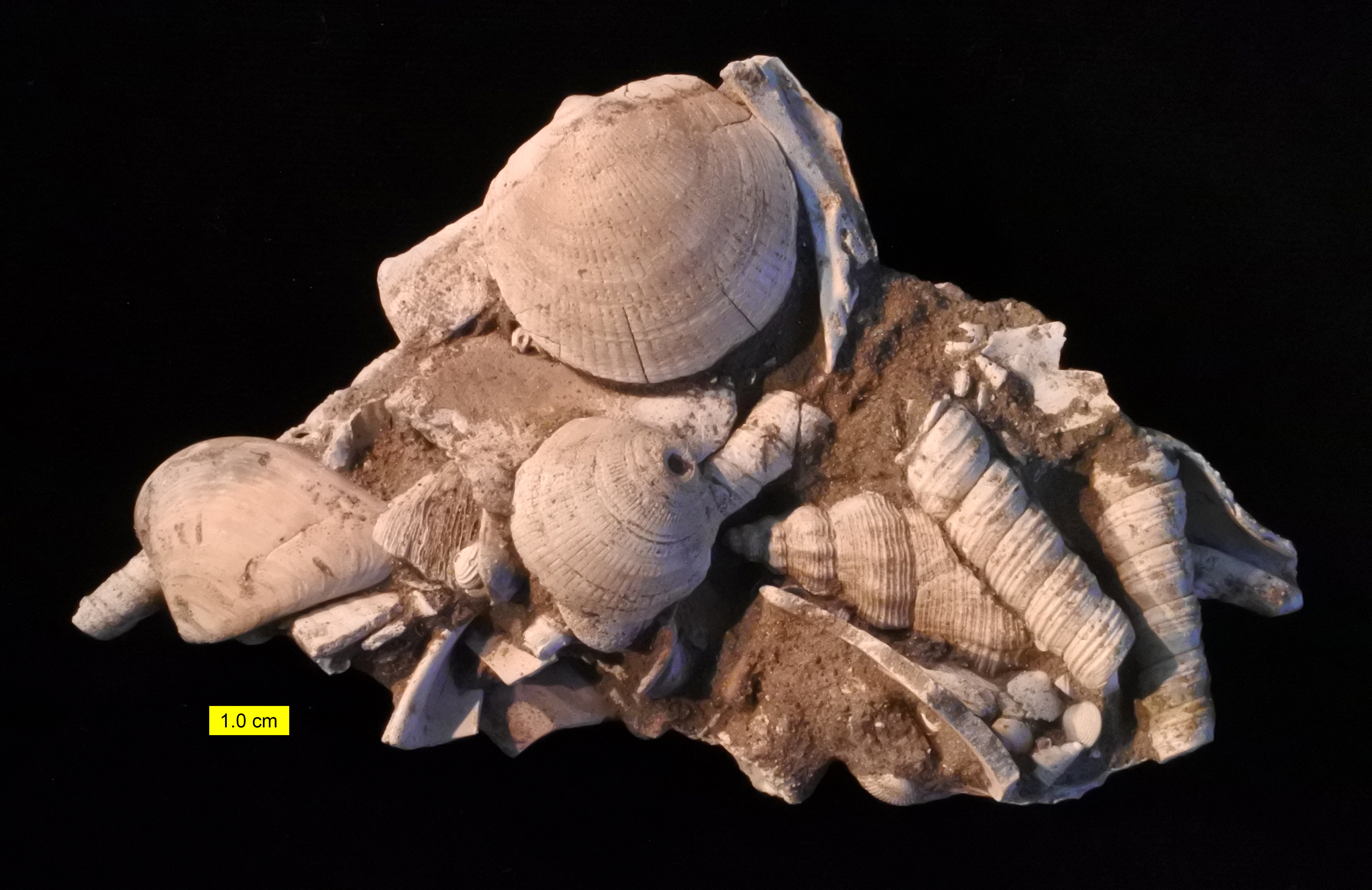
Fossils from the Calvert Formation, Zone 10, Calvert Co., MD (Miocene)

The Calvert Formation is notable for its plentiful fossil shark teeth. Especially popular among "rockhounds" are those from giants such as Carcharocles and the famous megalodon (which is often included in Carcharocles).

The ancestral baleen whale Eobalaenoptera harrisoni and the merganser Mergus miscellus were described from the Virginian part of the formation. From the uppermost layer, deposited 15–14 Ma, they represent the oldest known member of their family and genus, respectively. Some remains of a prehistoric loon (Gavia) from the lowermost parts of the Calvert Formation, dating back nearly 18 Ma, are the oldest records of that genus from North America, and among the oldest worldwide. Fossils of the sword fish-like Eurhinodelphis longirostris have been found in zone 14 of the formation.

Other notable baleen whales from this area include a Cephalotropis coronatus. One was discovered by hobbyist paleontologist Jeffery DiMeglio in 2004 after cliff erosion caused by Hurricane Isabel exposed the skull and scapula. Mandibles, neck vertebrae, and scapulae were also found during the dig. The skull and vertebrae are on display at the Calvert Marine Museum. Other items found in the field jackets of the whale were fish bones, hundreds of mollusks, a Hexanchus gigas tooth, and two Carcharodon hastalis teeth.

== Social history ==
On his 1612 map, Captain John Smith identified the area as "Rickard's Cliffes," having given them his mother's family's name. Some 350 years later, the state park was developed with the General Assembly funding land purchases in each year from 1965 to 1968, then in 1969, dedicating money to the installation of the park's initial roads, parking area, and utilities.

== Industrial neighbors ==
The Calvert Cliffs Nuclear Power Plant is located a short distance north of the park. The Dominion Cove Point liquid natural gas receiving station is visible off shore from the park beach.

== Activities and amenities ==
Calvert Cliffs State Park is mostly forested, with some wetland areas and a small pond for fishing. The park has 13 miles (21 km) of marked hiking trails. A quarter-mile-long sandy beach is accessible via a 1.8-mile (2.9 km) trail. Some 550 acres are open to hunting upland game, turkey, and deer. The park is rich in biodiversity and is home to numerous species of plants and animals, with at least 163 species of birds observed in the park.
