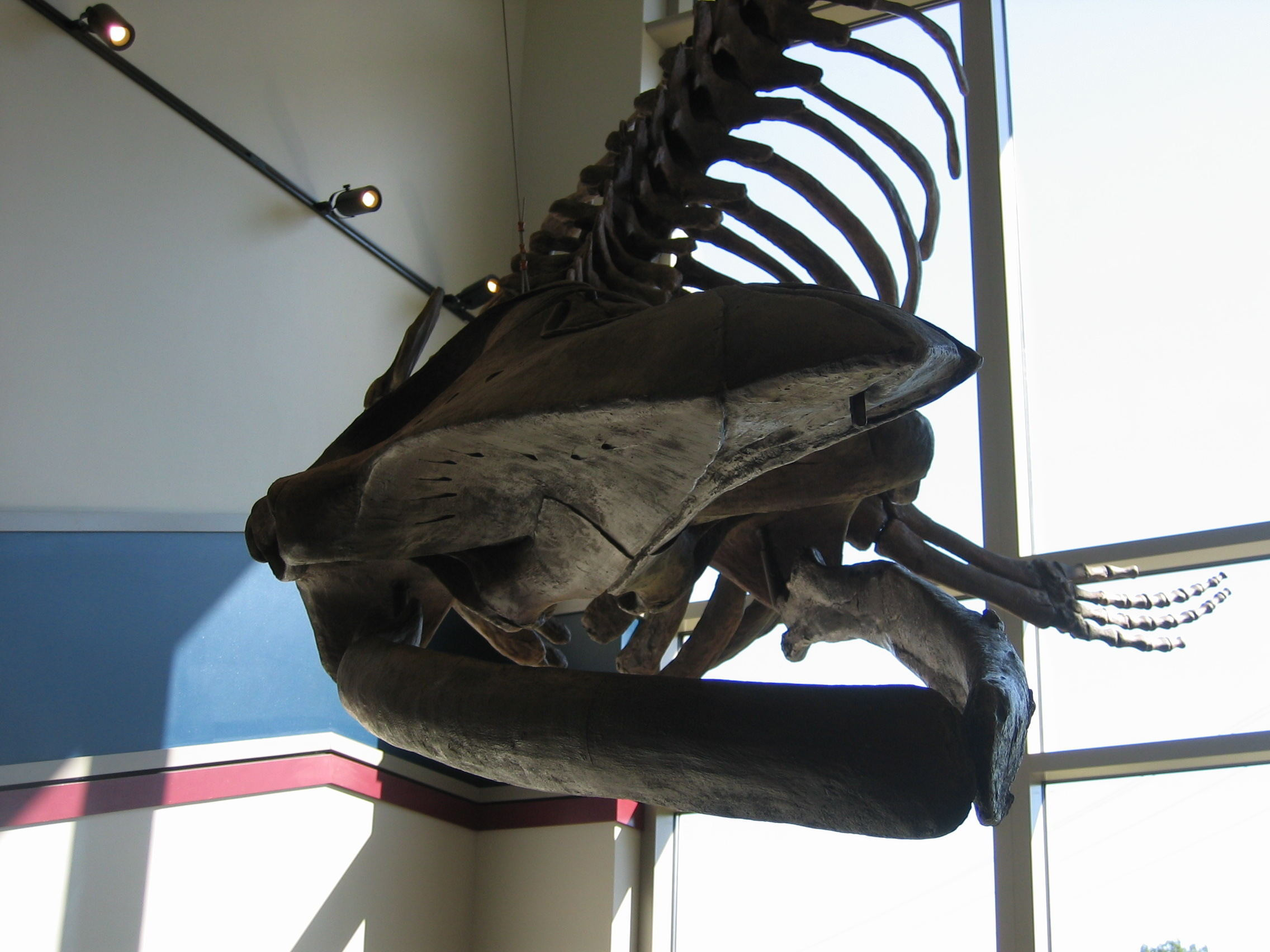
- Reconstructed skeleton, Caroline County, Virginia

Scientific classification
- Kingdom: Animalia
- Phylum: Chordata
- Class: Mammalia
- Order: Artiodactyla
- Infraorder: Cetacea
- Genus: †Eobalaenoptera; Dooley, Fraser & Luo, 2004
- Species: †E. harrisoni

Binomial name
- †Eobalaenoptera harrisoni Dooley, Fraser & Luo, 2004

= Eobalaenoptera =

Eobalaenoptera Temporal range: middle Miocene

Extinct genus of mammals

Eobalaenoptera is an extinct genus of baleen whale belonging to Balaenopteroidea.

== Discovery and significance ==
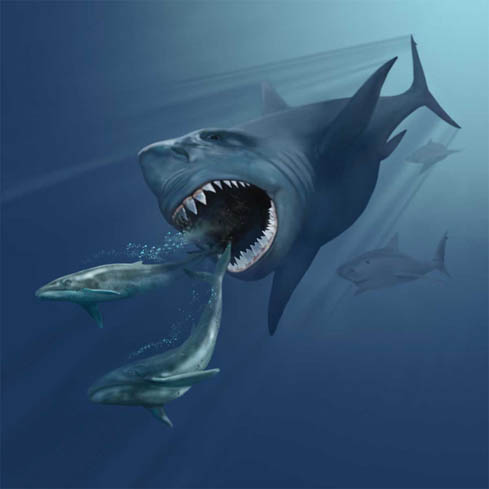
Artistic impression of two Eobalaenoptera pursued by the giant shark Otodus megalodon

Eobalaenoptera was first described in June 2004 by researchers at the Virginia Museum of Natural History from a partial skeleton found in 1990 in Caroline County, Virginia, the site of a prehistoric ocean, in the middle Miocene Calvert Formation. The 11 m (36 ft) skeleton proved to have similar morphological characteristics to a clade of whales consisting of two modern taxonomic families—Balaenopteridae (the rorquals) and Eschrichtiidae (a family with one surviving species, the gray whale).

The age of the Calvert Formation (14 million years) makes Eobalaenoptera the oldest-known member of Balaenopteroidea by three to five million years. It also considerably narrowed the gap between the earliest-known fossil record and estimated time of divergence of this clade from other baleen whales. Molecular clocks have put this divergence for balaenopteroids from other crown mysticetes by 15–20 million years.

In their review of extant and fossil rorquals, Demere et al. (2005) questioned the balaenopteroid placement of Eobalaenoptera, noting that the holotype lack substantial cranial material that could reinforce its original classification, preferring to treat the genus as Chaeomysticeti incertae sedis.

== Etymology ==
The genus name Eobalaenoptera reflects the similarities between this skeleton and species in the genus Balaenoptera such as the minke whale; eo- is a prefix meaning dawn. The species is named after Carter Harrison, a volunteer worker at the museum.
