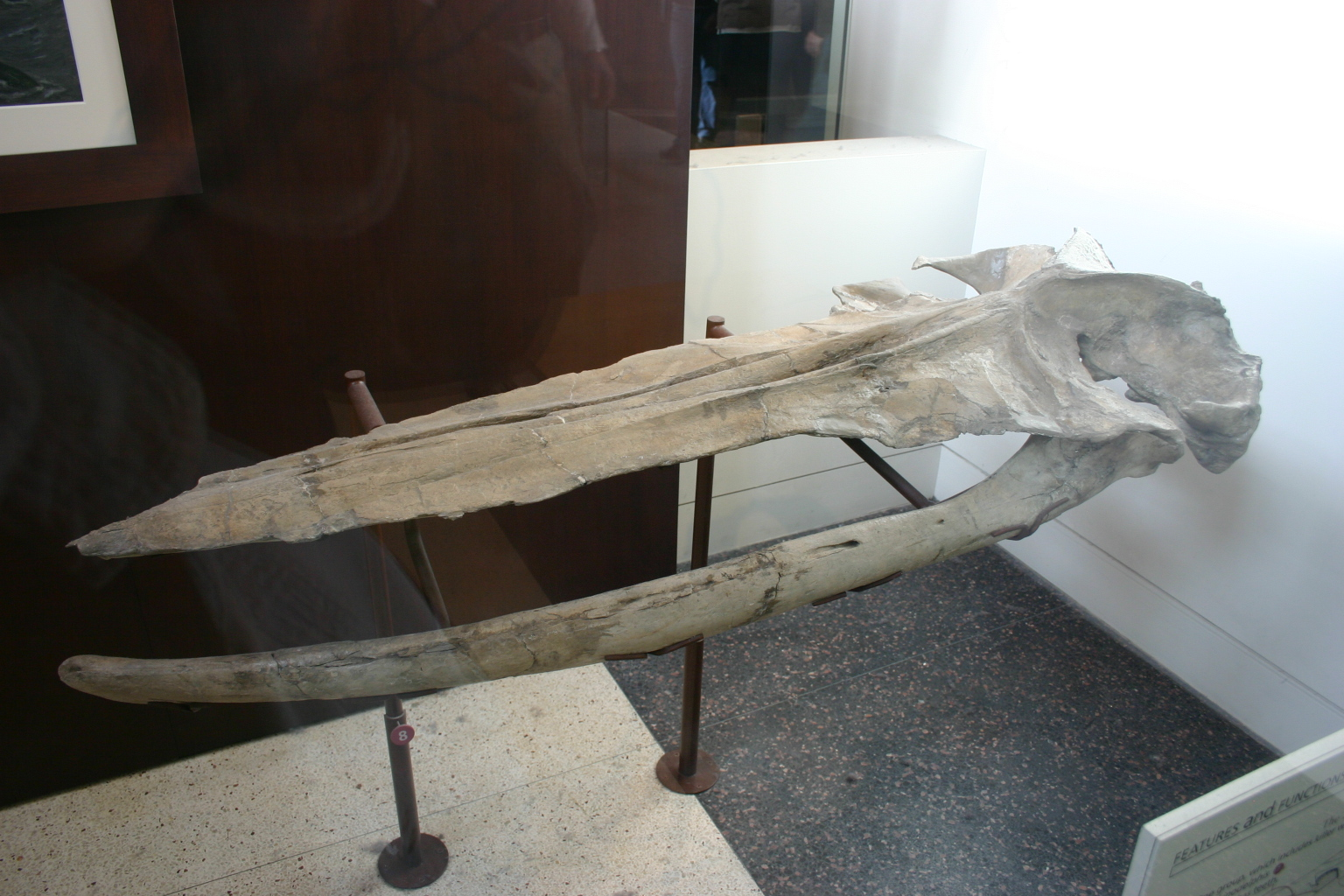
- Parietobalaena palmeri skull

Scientific classification
- Kingdom: Animalia
- Phylum: Chordata
- Class: Mammalia
- Order: Artiodactyla
- Infraorder: Cetacea
- Superfamily: Balaenopteroidea
- Family: †Pelocetidae; Steeman, 2007

Genera
- Cophocetus; Halicetus; Parietobalaena; Pelocetus

= Pelocetidae =

Pelocetidae Temporal range: Miocene

Extinct family of mammals

Pelocetidae is an extinct family of baleen whales. This family existed during the Miocene in North America, Europe, Australia and Japan.
