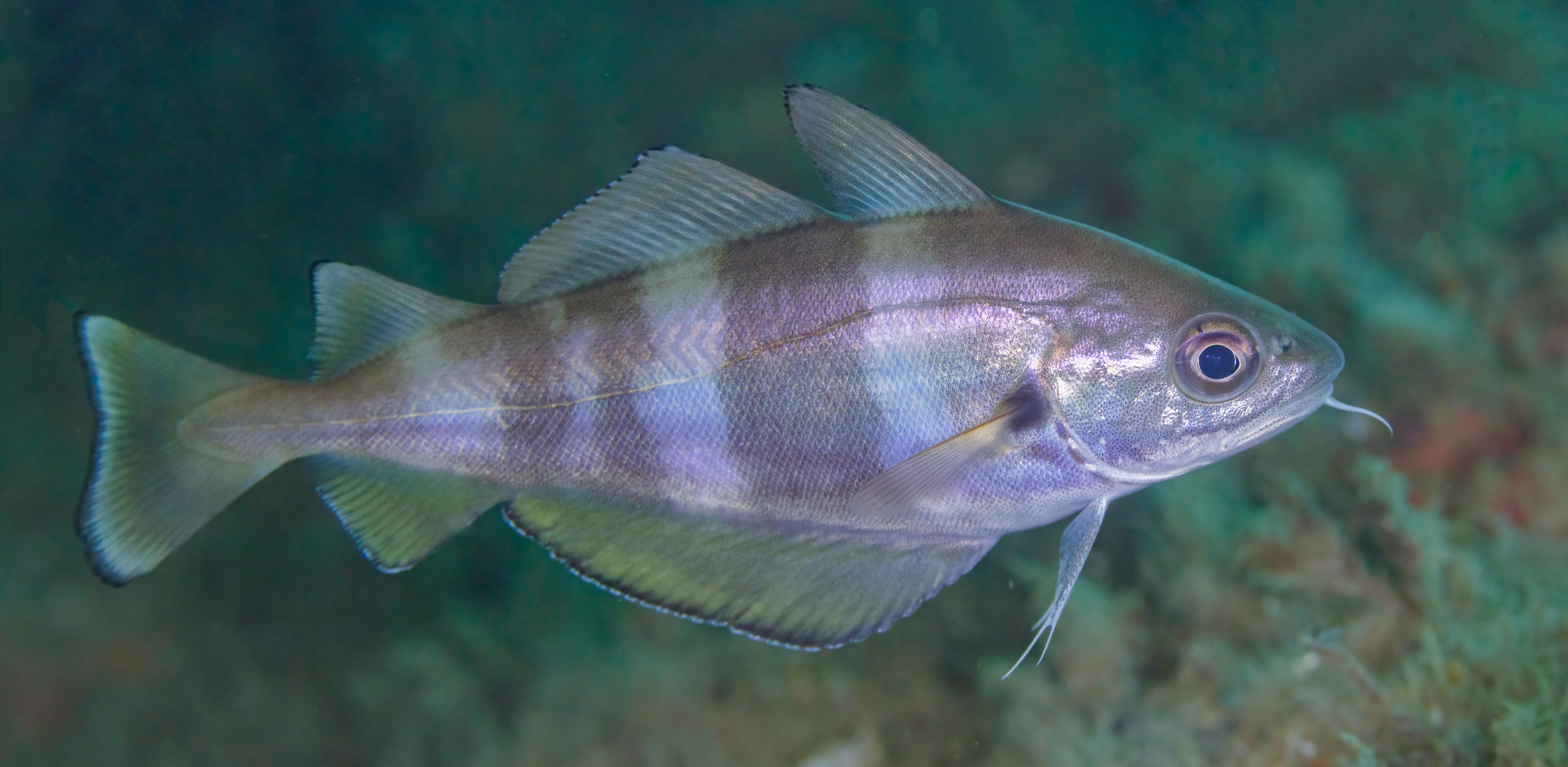

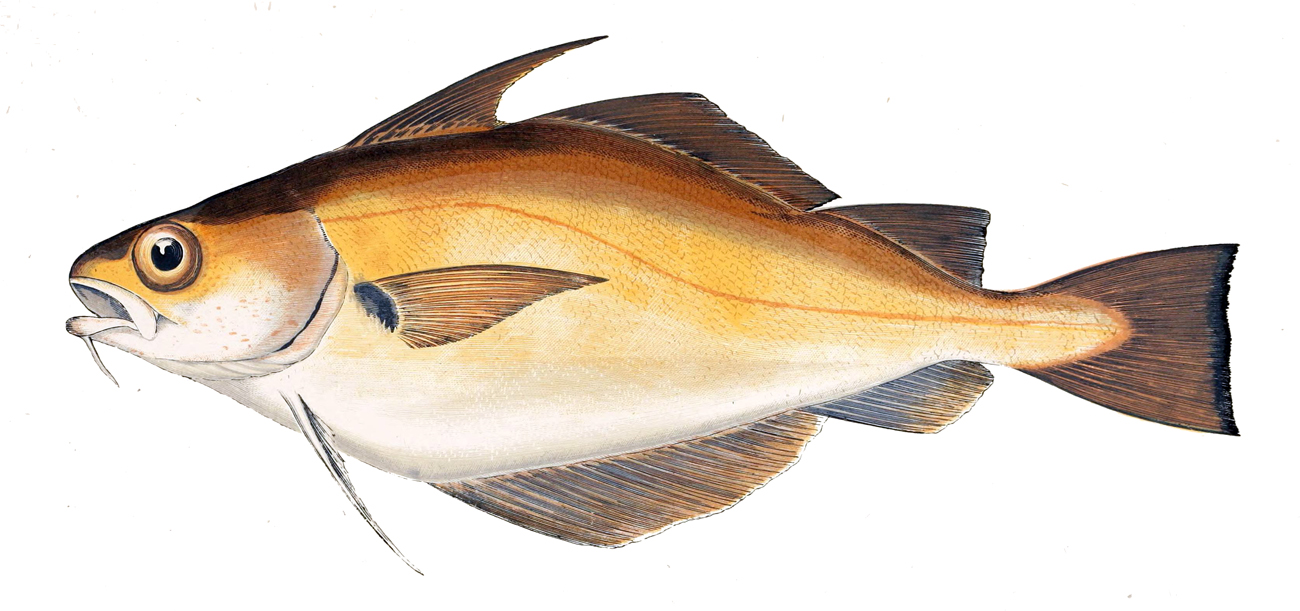

Conservation status
- Least Concern (IUCN 3.1)

Scientific classification
- Kingdom: Animalia
- Phylum: Chordata
- Class: Actinopterygii
- Division: Teleostei
- Order: Gadiformes
- Family: Gadidae
- Genus: Trisopterus
- Species: T. luscus

Binomial name
- Trisopterus luscus (Linnaeus, 1758)

Synonyms
- Gadus luscus Linnaeus, 1758

= Trisopterus luscus =

Species of fish

Trisopterus luscus (Latin pronunciation: [ˈtrisopterus ˈluskus]; most commonly known as pouting, but also called bib, pout whiting or pout) is a sea fish belonging to the cod family (Gadidae).

== Distribution, size and life cycle ==
The pouting is found predominantly in European waters, especially around the south and west of the British Isles and in Scandinavian waters, although populations can also be found in the Mediterranean and along the north African coast. They can be found across rocky and sandy seabeds with smaller specimens being found close to the shore and larger pouting moving further offshore. The greatest depths at which pouting can be found is 300 metres (980 ft). The pouting is generally a small fish, seldom exceeding 30 centimetres (12 in) in length, although rare specimens can reach almost double this length. Pouting can reproduce before they reach two years of age and grow rapidly, reaching around 15 centimetres (5.9 in) in length by the end of their first year. Pouting are a relatively short lived species, with the average lifespan thought to be around four years.

== Feeding and diet ==
Pouting are scavengers which feed on the seabed. They forage for any food source they can find with marine worms, shellfish and fish scraps all making up their diet. Due to its small size it is a source of prey for large species such as cod, bass and conger eels.

== Commercial value ==
Pouting were previously ignored as a commercial fish, with pouting that were inadvertently caught by trawlers being either discarded at sea or processed into fishmeal. Captured pouting are unlikely to survive when discarded. However, the decline in the stocks of whitefish species such as cod and haddock has seen pouting acquire a growing value as a commercial fish, and they are now available both as whole fish from fishmongers and supermarkets and are also used in fish products such as fish fingers and ready meals. Due to their naturally short lifespan and early breeding age the pouting is seen as a relatively sustainable fish to catch.
