= Eastover Formation =

Geologic formation in Virginia and North Carolina, United States

- Stratigraphic range: Late Miocene (Messinian)
- Type: Formation
- Unit of: Chesapeake Group
- Sub-units: Claremont Manor Member, Cobham Bay Member
- Underlies: Yorktown Formation
- Overlies: St. Marys Formation

Location
- Country: United States
- Extent: Virginia and North Carolina

The Eastover Formation is a geologic formation in Virginia, and North Carolina. It preserves fossils dating back to the Messinian stage of the Late Miocene Epoch, between 7 and 6 million years ago.

== Fossils ==
=== Marine mammals ===
The fossil iniid dolphins Meherrinia and Isoninia are both likely from the Eastover Formation (although they may potentially date to the overlying Yorktown Formation), as well as the earless seals Terranectes and Virginiaphoca.

=== Fossil plants ===
The flora of the Eastover Formation consists mostly of lignitized plant remains and a documented palynoflora record. The terrestrial palynoflora represented in the Eastover Formation consisted primarily of temperate -warm temperate taxa.

==== Known taxa ====
- Quercus (Oak)
- Alnus (Alder)
- Pinus (Pine)
- Betula (Birch)
- Taxodium (Cypress)
- Ulmus (Elm)
- Liquidambar (Sweetgum)
- Poaceae (Grasses)
- Cyperaceae (sedges)
- Amaranthaceae
- Asteraceae
