= Pelocetus =

Pelocetus Temporal range: Miocene, 16–13.6 Ma

Scientific classification
- Kingdom: Animalia
- Phylum: Chordata
- Class: Mammalia
- Order: Artiodactyla
- Infraorder: Cetacea
- Family: †Pelocetidae
- Genus: †Pelocetus; Kellogg, 1965

Species
- P. calvertensis (type) Kellogg, 1965

Extinct genus of whales

Pelocetus is an extinct genus of baleen whale, belonging to the family Pelocetidae. Fossils have been found in Miocene-aged marine strata in North America.
