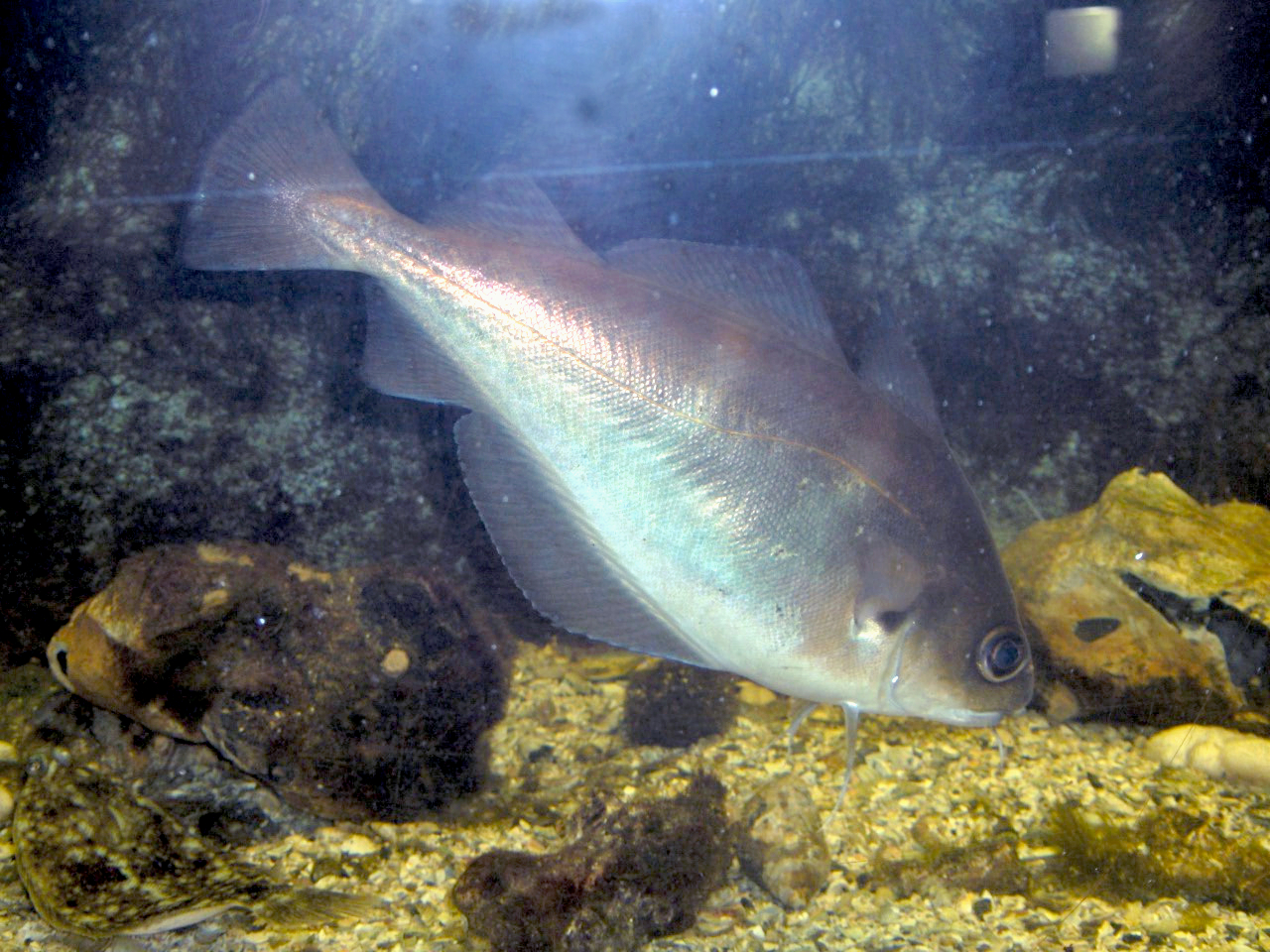
- Pouting (T. luscus)

Scientific classification
- Kingdom: Animalia
- Phylum: Chordata
- Class: Actinopterygii
- Division: Teleostei
- Order: Gadiformes
- Family: Gadidae
- Genus: Trisopterus; Rafinesque, 1814

Type species
- Trisopterus fasciatus Rafinesque, 1814

Species
- see text

Synonyms
- Allotrisopterus Gaemers, 2017; Brachygadus Gill, 1862; Gadulus Malm, 1877; Morua Risso, 1827; Neocolliolus Gaemers, 1976

= Trisopterus =

Genus of fishes

Trisopterus is a genus of small cods, family Gadidae. They are native to the northeastern Atlantic Ocean including the Mediterranean Sea.

== Species ==
There are currently four recognized species in this genus:

- Trisopterus capelanus (Lacépède, 1800)
- Trisopterus esmarkii (Nilsson, 1855) (Norway pout)
- Trisopterus luscus (Linnaeus, 1758) (pouting)
- Trisopterus minutus (Linnaeus, 1758) (poor cod)

Trisopterus capelanus was until recently (2011) considered to be a subspecies of Trisopterus minutus, but both genetic and morphometric data clearly support the status of Trisopterus capelanus as a separate species.
