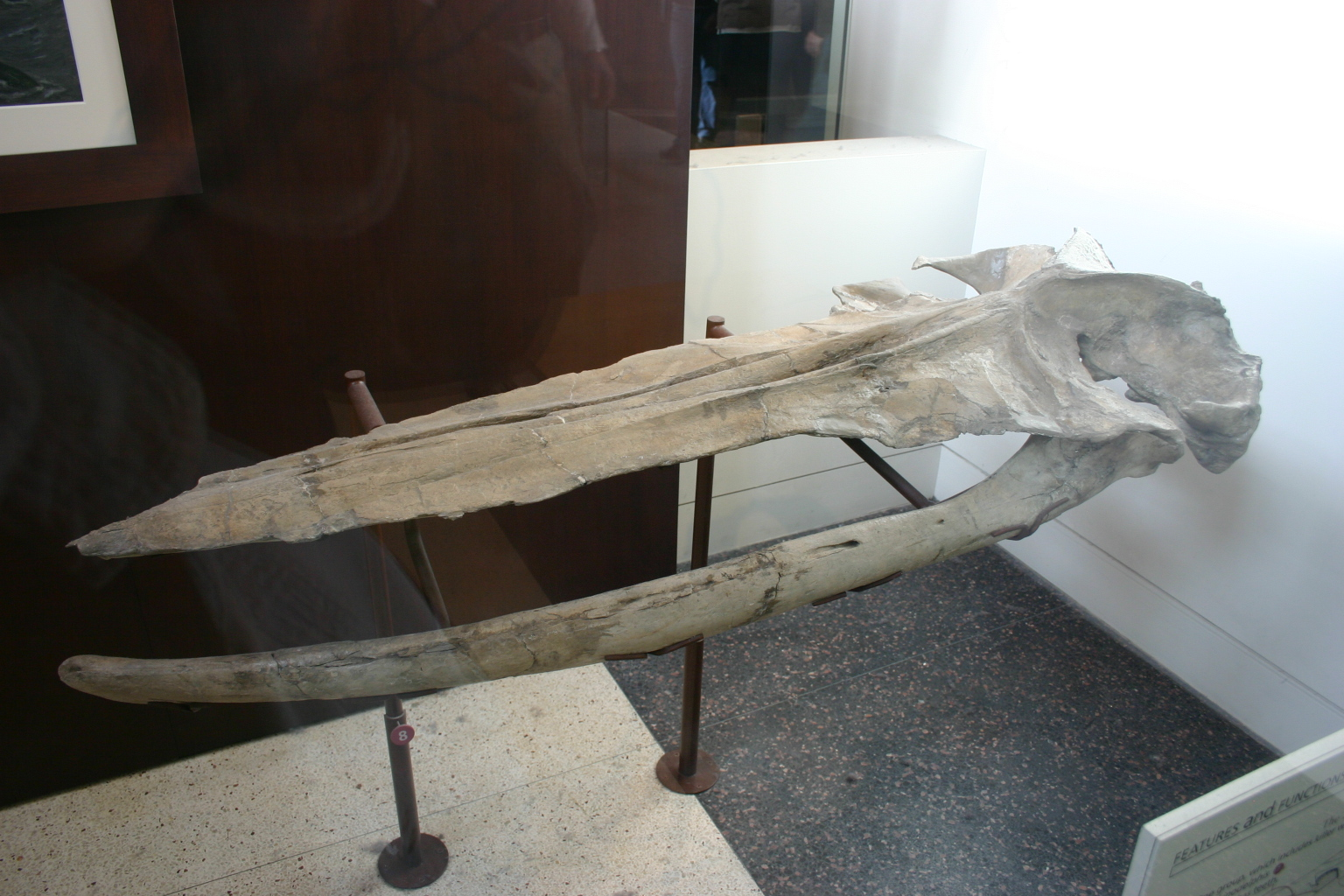
- Parietobalaena palmeri, AMNH

Scientific classification
- Kingdom: Animalia
- Phylum: Chordata
- Class: Mammalia
- Order: Artiodactyla
- Infraorder: Cetacea
- Family: †Pelocetidae
- Genus: †Parietobalaena; Kellogg 1924, p. 1

Species
- P. affinis Van Beneden 1880, p. 21; P. campiniana Bisconti, Lambert & Bosselaers 2013; P. laxata Van Beneden 1880, p. 23; P. palmeri (type) Kellogg 1924, p. 2; P. (?) securis Kellogg 1931, p. 343; P. yamaokai Otsuka & Ota 2008

= Parietobalaena =

Parietobalaena Temporal range: Miocene, 16.1–15.6 Ma

Extinct genus of baleen whale

Parietobalaena is an extinct genus of baleen whale, belonging to the family Pelocetidae. Fossils are found in Miocene-aged marine strata in North America, Europe, Australia, and Japan, including the Temblor and Itahashi formations. Based on previous estimates of juvenile specimens, Tsai (2017) suggested a body size of 12-15 m for P. yamaokai, akin to that of the gray whale.

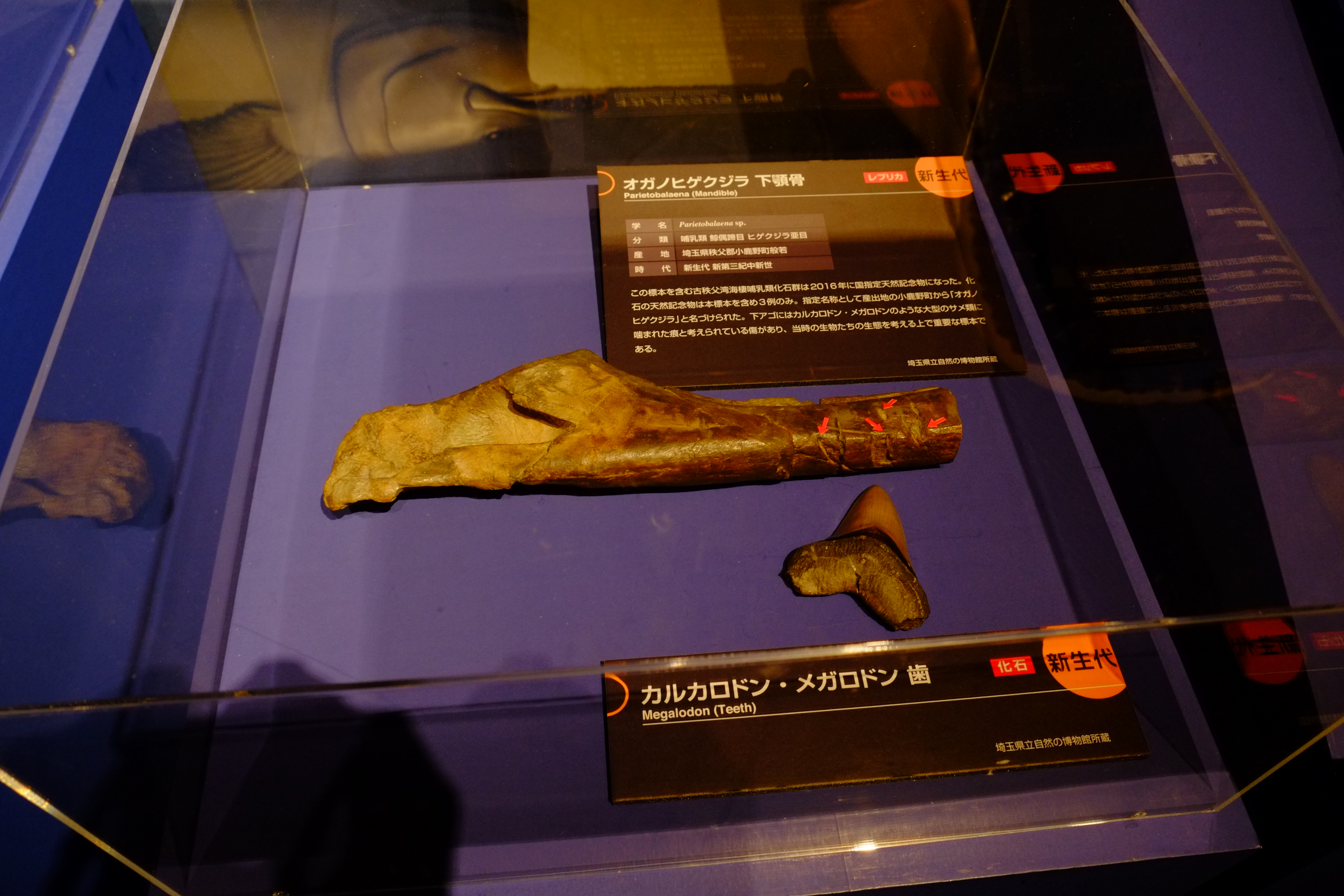
Mandible with tooth marks from megalodon

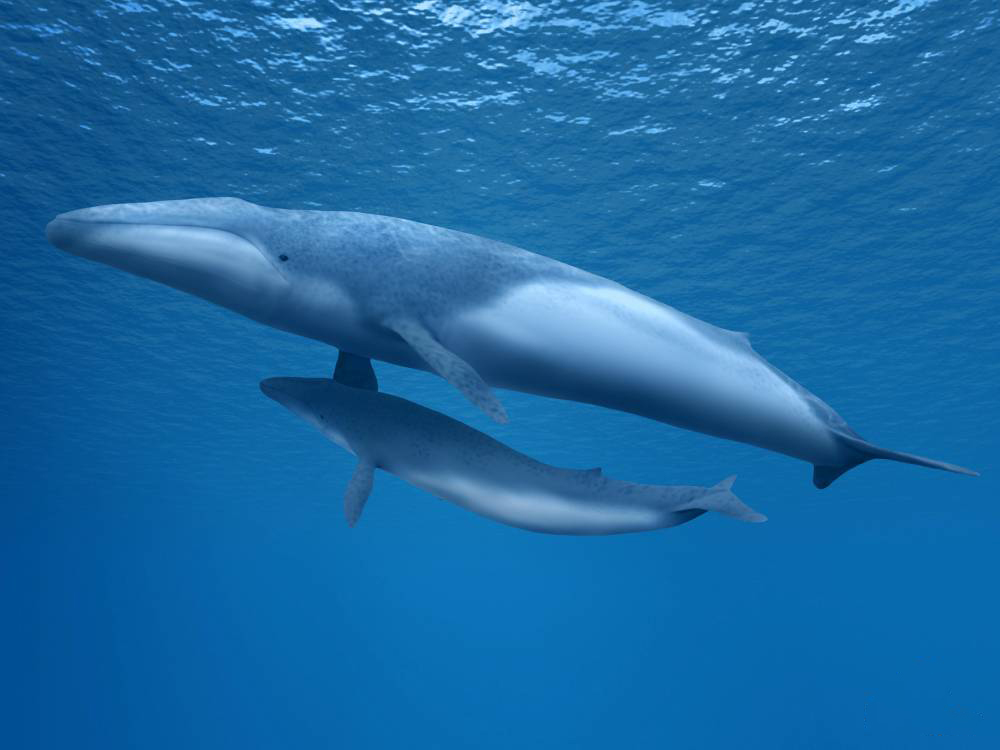
Life restoration of Parietobalaena yamaokai and calf

== Sources ==
- Bisconti, M.; Lambert, O.; Bosselaers, M. (2013). "Taxonomic revision of Isocetus depauwi (Mammalia, Cetacea, Mysticeti) and the phylogenetic relationships of archaic 'cetothere' mysticetes". Palaeontology. 56 (1): 95–127. Bibcode:2013Palgy..56...95B. doi:10.1111/j.1475-4983.2012.01168.x. ISSN 0031-0239. OCLC 826744606.
  - "M. Bisconti et al. 2013". The Paleobiology Database. Archived from the original on 2013-10-14.
- Kellogg, R. (1924). "Description of a new genus and species of whalebone whale from the Calvert Cliffs, Maryland". Proceedings of the United States National Museum. 63 (2483): 1–14. doi:10.5479/si.00963801.63-2483.1. hdl:10088/15284. OCLC 631781115.
  - "R. Kellogg 1924". Fossilworks.
- Otsuka, H.; Ota, Y. (2008). "Cetotheres from the early Middle Miocene Bihoku Group in Shobara District, Hiroshima Prefecture, West Japan". Miscellaneous Reports of the Hiwa Museum for Natural History. 49: 1–66.
  - "H. Otsuka and Y. Ota 2008". Fossilworks.
- Van Beneden, P, J. (1880). "Les Mysticètes à courts fanons des sables des environs d'Anvers". Bulletin de l'Académie Royale des Sciences, des Lettres et des Beaux-Arts de Belgique. 2. 11–27.
