= Callophoca =

Callophoca Temporal range: late Miocene–early Pliocene

Scientific classification
- Kingdom: Animalia
- Phylum: Chordata
- Class: Mammalia
- Order: Carnivora
- Parvorder: Pinnipedia
- Family: Phocidae
- Subfamily: Monachinae
- Genus: †Callophoca van Beneden, 1876

Species
- C. obscura van Beneden, 1876 (type species)

Extinct genus of carnivores

Callophoca is an extinct genus of earless seals from the late Miocene to early Pliocene of Belgium and the US Eastern Seaboard.

The type and only species of Callophoca is C. obscura. Mesotaria ambigua, based on the lectotype humerus IRSNB 1156-M177, is a synonym. Although numerous non-humeral bones have been assigned to Callophoca, they are best considered Monachinae indet. pending further study because they have been found, isolated, leaving the M. ambigua lectotype, IRSNB 1116-M188, IRSNB VERT-17172-301b, and USNM 186944 the only unambiguous referred specimens of Callophoca.
