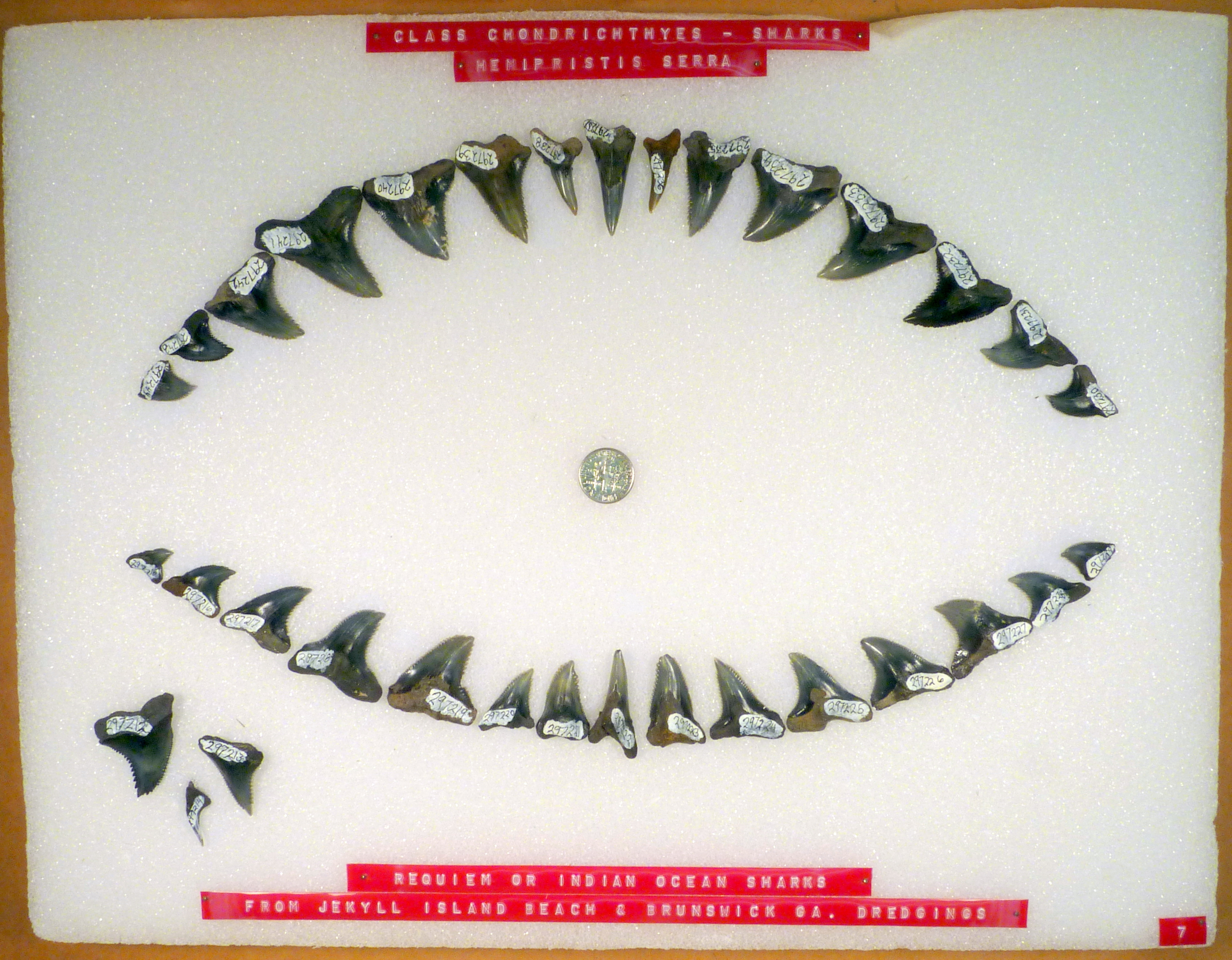
- Tooth series of Hemipristis serra

Scientific classification
- Kingdom: Animalia
- Phylum: Chordata
- Class: Chondrichthyes
- Subclass: Elasmobranchii
- Division: Selachii
- Order: Carcharhiniformes
- Family: Hemigaleidae
- Genus: Hemipristis
- Species: †H. serra

Binomial name
- †Hemipristis serra (Agassiz, 1843)

= Hemipristis serra =

Hemipristis serra Temporal range: Miocene Potential Chibanian records

Species of shark

Hemipristis serra is an extinct species of weasel shark which lived during the Miocene epoch to the Late Middle Pleistocene epoch, with these later records – from the Javanese part of Sundaland – being thought to be relictual. It was described by Louis Agassiz in 1843. While today's snaggletooth shark is not very large or dangerous, Hemipristis serra was considerably larger than its modern-day relative and had much larger teeth. Its total length is estimated to be 6 metres (20 ft). Marks made by the teeth of H. serra are often found on the bones of the dugong Metaxytherium leading some scientists to hypothesize that H. serra specialized in preying on these sirenians. In the Gatun Formation of Panama, H. serra was contemporary with pups of the large lamniform shark Otodus megalodon, and both it and the great hammerhead are theorized to have preyed on the pups of this larger shark due to their presence within the formation.

The unusual teeth of Hemipristis serra are highly prized by collectors because they are often found in sediments in Southern Florida that yield colorful fossil shark teeth. Their large serrations make it a unique collectible fossil. Little else is known about the general appearance of H. serra, as there are no known fossils preserving its cartilaginous skeleton at present.

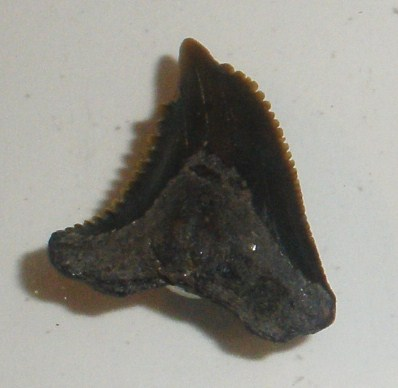
Fossil tooth of Hemipristis serra

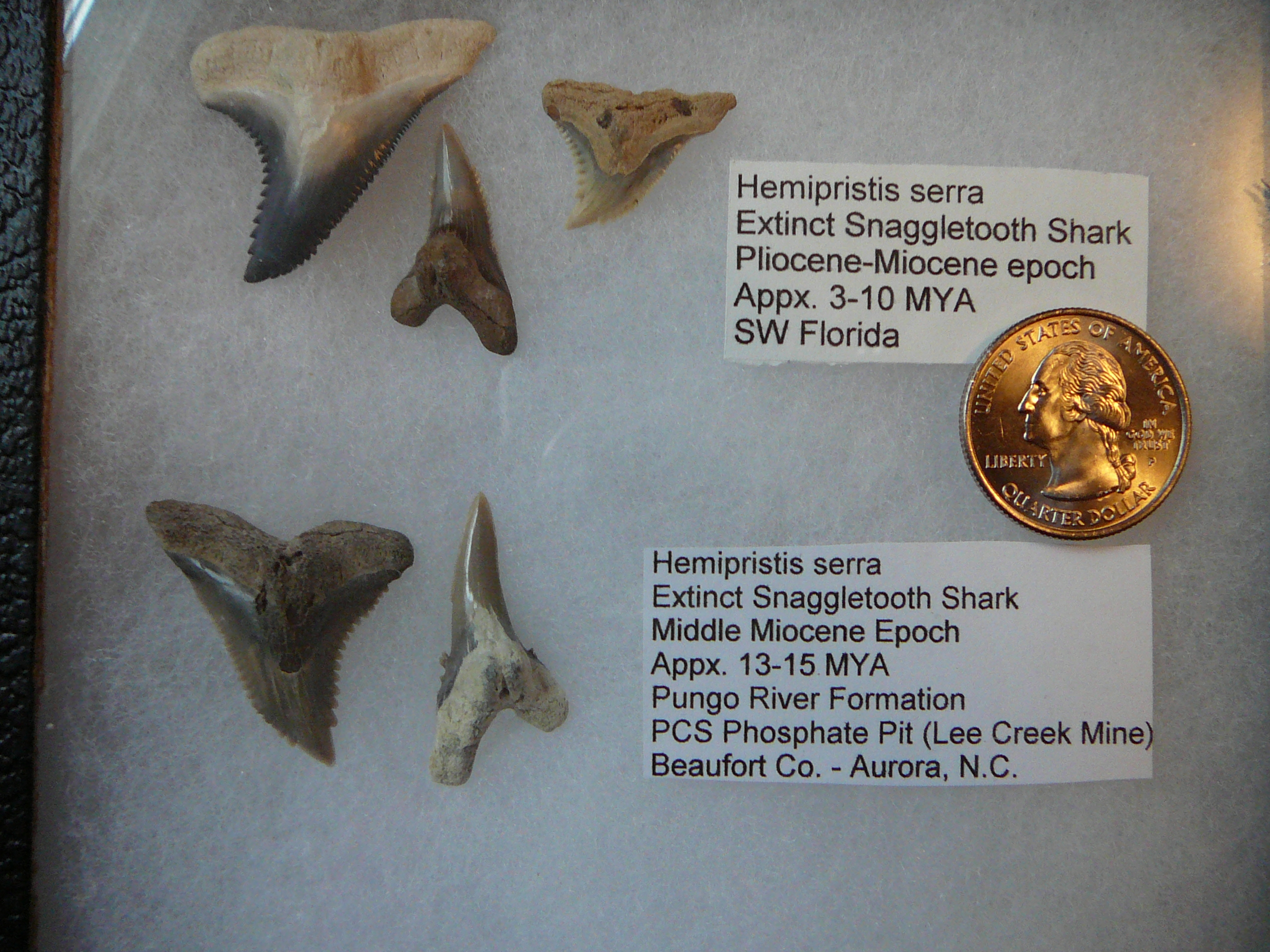
Several Hemipristis serra teeth from two different locations in the U.S., housed in a large ryker display
