= Pungo River Formation =

Geologic formation in North Carolina, United States

- Stratigraphic range: Aquitanian to Langhian
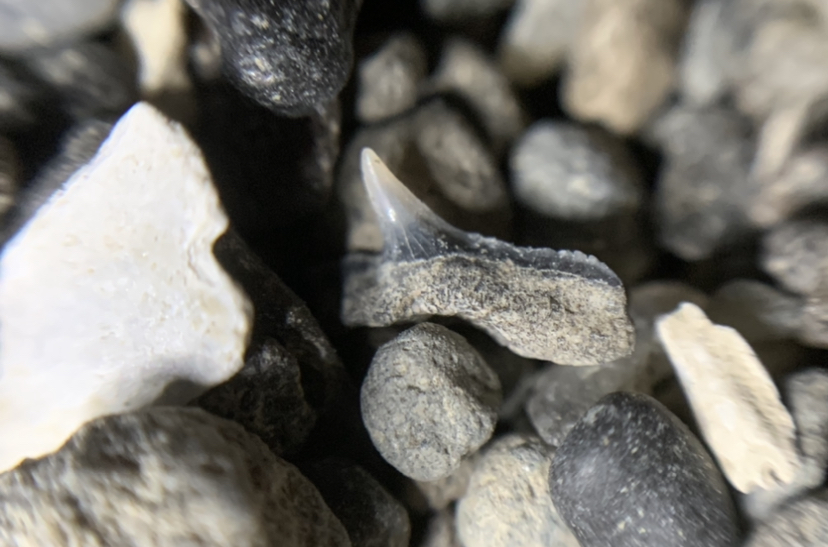
- Carcharhinus sp. posterior tooth in the Pungo River Formation
- Type: Formation
- Underlies: Yorktown Formation
- Overlies: Castle Hayne Formation

Lithology
- Primary: sand, silt, clay, limestone, phosphorite

Location
- Region: North Carolina
- Country: United States

Type section
- Named for: Pungo River

The Pungo River Formation is a geologic formation in North Carolina. It preserves fossils dating back to the Early to Middle Miocene. It is economically significant for the high levels of phosphate mined from the formation.

== Stratigraphy ==
The Pungo River Formation is divided into two members, the Early Miocene-aged Belhaven Member and the Middle Miocene-aged Bonnerton Member. It stretches from southern North Carolina north to southeastern Virginia, being replaced northwards by the roughly coeval Calvert Formation. However, it largely lies buried underground throughout much of this range, generally at depths of 120 to 170 feet (37 to 52 m) below the surface. The only major terrestrial exposure is at the Aurora mine, although offshore exposures are also known on the continental shelf of Onslow Bay, which were likely redeposited via sea-level changes over the Pliocene and Pleistocene.

The deposition of the Pungo River Formation is thought to be linked to a major marine transgression from the Mid-Miocene Climactic Optimum, which inundated the Onslow and Aurora embayments. Deposition of the Pungo River Formation would have ended following a recession of the sea level, exposing more land. Later, the ocean would have again submerged the land, depositing the Yorktown Formation over it.

The highly fossiliferous and phosphorus-rich deposits in Beaufort County, which are now mined, are thought to have been formed by a large back eddy that formed behind a predecessor to Cape Lookout. The eddy would have caught many marine organisms that used up all the dissolved oxygen in the water, forming a large dead zone that allowed organic materials to easily fossilize due to the lack of decomposition.

=== Economic significance ===
The Pungo River Formation is mined extensively for its phosphorite deposits, including at one of the largest phosphate mines in the world, the Aurora mine. The deposits were discovered during exploratory efforts in 1955 by Texas Gulf, with the mine being established by 1965. Due to the highly fossiliferous nature of the Pungo River formation and the overlying Yorktown Formation, both of which are exposed at the mine, numerous fossils have been discovered at the mine, and the sediments from it are a prime target for fossil collecting. Some of the mine's most notable fossils are displayed at the Aurora Fossil Museum.

== Vertebrate paleobiota ==
Based on the Paleobiology Database except where noted:

=== Cartilaginous fish ===
Based on Purdy et al.. (2001):

| Genus | Species | Notes | Images |
|---|---|---|---|
| Aetobatus | A. sp. | An eagle ray. | |
| Alopias | A. cf. superciliosus | | |
| Alopias | A. cf. vulpinus | A thresher shark, potentially the modern common thresher. | |
| Carcharhinus | C. brachyurus | | |
| Carcharhinus | C. falciformis | | |
| Carcharhinus | C. leucas | | |
| Carcharhinus | C. perezi | | |
| Carcharhinus | C. plumbeus | | |
| Carcharhinus | C. priscus | An extinct requiem shark. | |
| Carcharias | C. acutissimus | An extinct sand tiger shark. | |
| Carcharias | C. sp. | A relative of the sand tiger shark. | |
| Carcharodon (=Cosmopolitodus) | C. hastalis | A mackerel shark related to the modern white shark. | |
| Carcharoides | C. catticus | A mackerel shark. Teeth formerly assigned to Triaenodon obesus. | |
| Cetorhinus | C. sp. | A relative of the basking shark. | |
| Chaenogaleus | C. affinis | An extinct relative of the hooktooth shark. | |
| Dasyatis | D. cf. americana | A stingray similar to the modern southern stingray. | |
| Echinorhinus | E. cf. blakei | An extinct bramble shark. | |
| Galeocerdo | G. aduncus | An extinct relative of the tiger shark. | |
| Ginglymostoma | G. sp. | A nurse shark. | |
| Hemipristis | H. serra | An extinct relative of the snaggletooth shark. | |
| Hypogaleus | H. sp. | A relative of the blacktip tope. | |
| Isurus | I. oxyrinchus | The modern shortfin mako shark. | |
| Megachasma | M. sp. | A relative of the megamouth shark. | |
| Megalolamna | M. paradoxodon | A mackerel shark. | |
| Megascyliorhinus | M. miocaenicus | A catshark. | |
| Mobula | M. sp. | A devil ray. | |
| Mustelus | M. sp. | A smooth-hound. | |
| Negaprion | N. brevirostris | The modern lemon shark. | |
| Notorynchus | N. cepedianus | The modern broadnose sevengill shark. | |
| Odontaspis | O. cuspidata | An extinct sand shark. | |
| Odontaspis | O. ferox | The modern deepwater sand tiger. | |
| Otodus | O. chubutensis | A megatooth shark. | |
| Otodus | O. megalodon | A megatooth shark, the megalodon. | |
| Paragaleus | P. sp. | A weasel shark. | |
| Physogaleus | P. contortus | A requiem shark. | |
| Plinthicus | P. stenodon | A devil ray. | |
| Pristiophorus | P. sp. | A sawshark. | |
| Pteromylaeus | P. sp. | An eagle ray. | |
| Rhincodon | R. sp. | A relative of the whale shark. | |
| Rhinobatos | R. sp. | A guitarfish. | |
| Rhinoptera | R. sp. | A cownose ray. | |
| Rhizoprionodon | R. sp. | A sharpnose shark. | |
| Scyliorhinus | S. sp. | A catshark. | |
| Sphyrna | S. cf. media | A hammerhead shark, potentially the modern scoophead. | |
| Sphyrna | S. zygaena | The modern smooth hammerhead. | |
| Squatina | S. sp. | An angelshark. | |

=== Bony fish ===
Based on Purdy et al.. (2001):

| Genus | Species | Notes | Images |
|---|---|---|---|
| Aglyptorhynchus | A. sp. | A billfish. Previously assigned to Hemirhabdorhynchus. | |
| Aluterus | A. sp. | A filefish. | |
| Bagre | B. sp. | A sea catfish. | |
| Chilomycterus | C. circumflexus | An extinct burrfish. Previously assigned to the extant Chilomycterus schoepfii. | |
| Lagodon | L. cf. rhomboides | A seabream, potentially the modern pinfish. | |
| Megalops | M. cf. atlanticus | A tarpon, potentially the modern Atlantic tarpon. | |
| Pogonias | P. cf. cromis | A drumfish, potentially the modern black drum. | |
| Sarda | S. aff. sarda | A bonito, potentially the modern Atlantic bonito. | |
| Sphyraena | S. cf. barracuda | A barracuda, potentially the modern great barracuda. | |
| Thunnus | T. sp. | A tuna. | |

=== Reptiles ===
| Genus | Species | Notes | Images |
|---|---|---|---|
| Bairdemys | B. miocenica | A marine side-necked turtle. | |
| Thecachampsa | T. antiqua | A gavialoid crocodilian. | |

=== Birds ===
Based on Olson & Rasmussen (2001):

| Genus | Species | Notes | Images |
|---|---|---|---|
| Anatidae indet. | | A waterfowl of uncertain affinities. | |
| Ardenna | A. aff. gravis | A shearwater similar to the modern great shearwater. | |
| ?Balearica | ?B. sp. | A crane, potentially a crowned crane. | |
| Ciconia | C. sp. | A stork. | |
| Ciconiidae indet. | | A stork of uncertain affinities. | |
| ?Colymboides | ?C. sp. | A potential early loon. | |
| Gavia | G. egeriana | A loon. | |
| Galliformes indet. | | A landfowl of uncertain affinities. | |
| Heliornis | H. aff. fulica | A finfoot similar to the modern sungrebe. The only fossil record of the family. | |
| Larus | L. sp. | A gull. | |
| Miocepphus | M. mcclungi | An early auk. Type locality for M. mergulellus. Stratigraphy uncertain, but most likely belongs to the Pungo River Formation due to the genus being largely restricted to the Miocene. | |
| Miocepphus | M. mergulellus | An early auk. Type locality for M. mergulellus. Stratigraphy uncertain, but most likely belongs to the Pungo River Formation due to the genus being largely restricted to the Miocene. | |
| Morus | M. atlanticus | An extinct gannet. | |
| Morus | M. loxostyla | An extinct gannet. | |
| ?Ortalis | ?O. sp. | A potential chachalaca. | |
| Phasianidae indet. | | A small indeterminate galliform about the size of a mountain quail. | |
| Puffinus | P. sp. | A shearwater. | |
| Rallidae indet. | | A rail of uncertain affinities. | |

=== Mammals ===
| Genus | Species | Notes | Images |
|---|---|---|---|
| Ankylorhiza | A. tiedemani | A toothed whale. | |
| Ankylorhiza | cf. A. sp. | A toothed whale. | |
| Anoplonassa | A. sp. | A beaked whale. | |
| Araeodelphis | A. cf. natator | A platanistid toothed whale. | |
| aff. Atocetus | aff. A. sp. | A potential pontoporiid toothed whale. | |
| Brevirostrodelphis | B. dividum | A toothed whale. | |
| cf. Champsodelphis | C. sp. | A champsodelphinid toothed whale. | |
| cf. Phococetus | P. sp. | A toothed whale of uncertain affinities. | |
| Delphinodon | D. cf. mento | A kentriodontid toothed whale. | |
| Eurhinodelphinidae indet. | | A eurhinodelphinid toothed whale. | |
| Kentriodon | K. schneideri | A kentriodontid toothed whale. | |
| Kentriodon | K. sp. | A kentriodontid toothed whale. | |
| Kentriodontidae indet. | | A kentriodontid toothed whale. | |
| aff. Liolithax | aff. L. pappus | A kentriodontid toothed whale. | |
| Nannolithax | N. sp. | A toothed whale. | |
| ?Nanosiren | ?N. sp. | A small dugongid sirenian. | |
| aff. Ninoziphius | aff. N. platyrostris | A beaked whale. | |
| Physeteridae indet. | | A physeterid toothed whale. | |
| Physeterula | P. sp. | A physeterid toothed whale. | |
| Pontoporiidae indet. | | A pontoporiid toothed whale. | |
| Squalodon | S. calvertensis | A squalodontid toothed whale. | |
| Squalodon | S. sp. | A squalodontid toothed whale. | |
| Squalodelphinidae indet. | | A squalodelphinid toothed whale. | |
| Tretosphys | T. gabbii | A toothed whale. | |
| Xiphiacetus | X. sp. | A eurhinodelphinid toothed whale. | |
| Ziphiidae indet. | | A beaked whale. | |

== See also ==
- List of fossiliferous stratigraphic units in North Carolina
