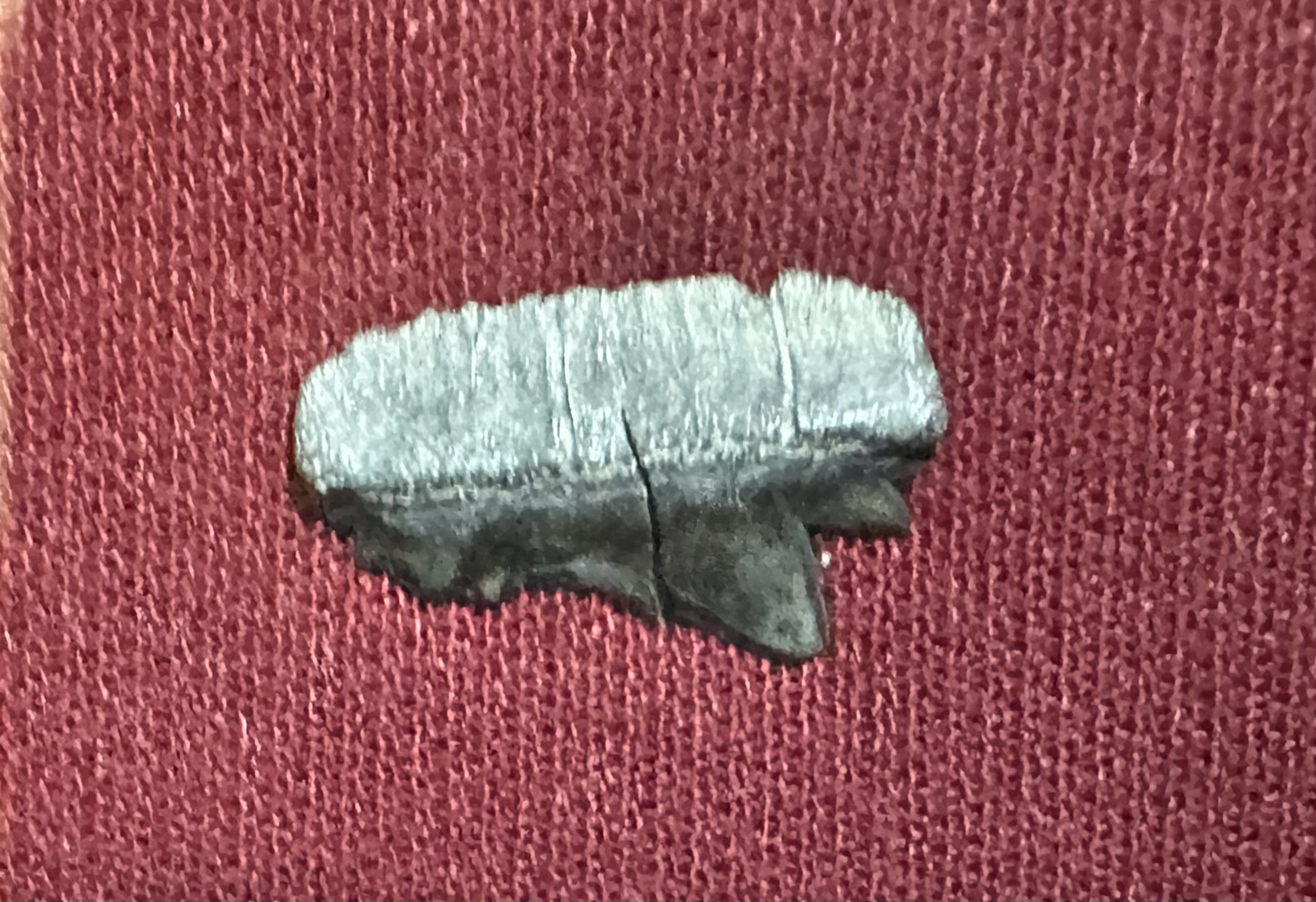
- Fossil tooth, Aurora Fossil Museum

Scientific classification
- Kingdom: Animalia
- Phylum: Chordata
- Class: Chondrichthyes
- Subclass: Elasmobranchii
- Division: Selachii
- Order: Echinorhiniformes
- Family: Echinorhinidae
- Genus: Echinorhinus
- Species: †E. blakei

Binomial name
- †Echinorhinus blakei Agassiz, 1855

= Echinorhinus blakei =

Echinorhinus blakei Temporal range: Late Oligocene to Early Pliocene

Echinorhinus blakei is an extinct species of bramble shark from the Late Oligocene to the Early Pliocene of North America, where it inhabited both coasts. Fossil teeth and putative dermal denticles are known from California, Oregon, Maryland, Virginia, and North Carolina. The species was first described from a fossil tooth recovered from Poso Creek in California by William Phipps Blake as part of the Pacific Railroad Survey, and named in honor of Blake by Louis Agassiz.

It has sometimes been suggested that the species is conspecific with the extant bramble shark (E. brucus), although there are some clear distinctions between the teeth and denticles of both species. The teeth tend to be rather rare in the deposits they occur in, likely due to the presumed deepwater habits of this species.

As a medium-sized suction feeder belonging to an ancient lineage, Echinorhinus blakei is thought to have been one of the most functionally unique shark species of the Neogene, and its extinction left a major gap in the functional diversity of sharks that persists to the current day.

It is known from the following formations:

- Temblor Formation (Late Oligocene to Early Miocene of California)
- Pungo River Formation (Early Miocene of North Carolina)
- Calvert Formation (Middle Miocene of Maryland and Virginia)
- Yorktown Formation (Early Pliocene of North Carolina)
