= Arroyo Process Equipment =

American-based distribution company

Arroyo Process Equipment, Inc.
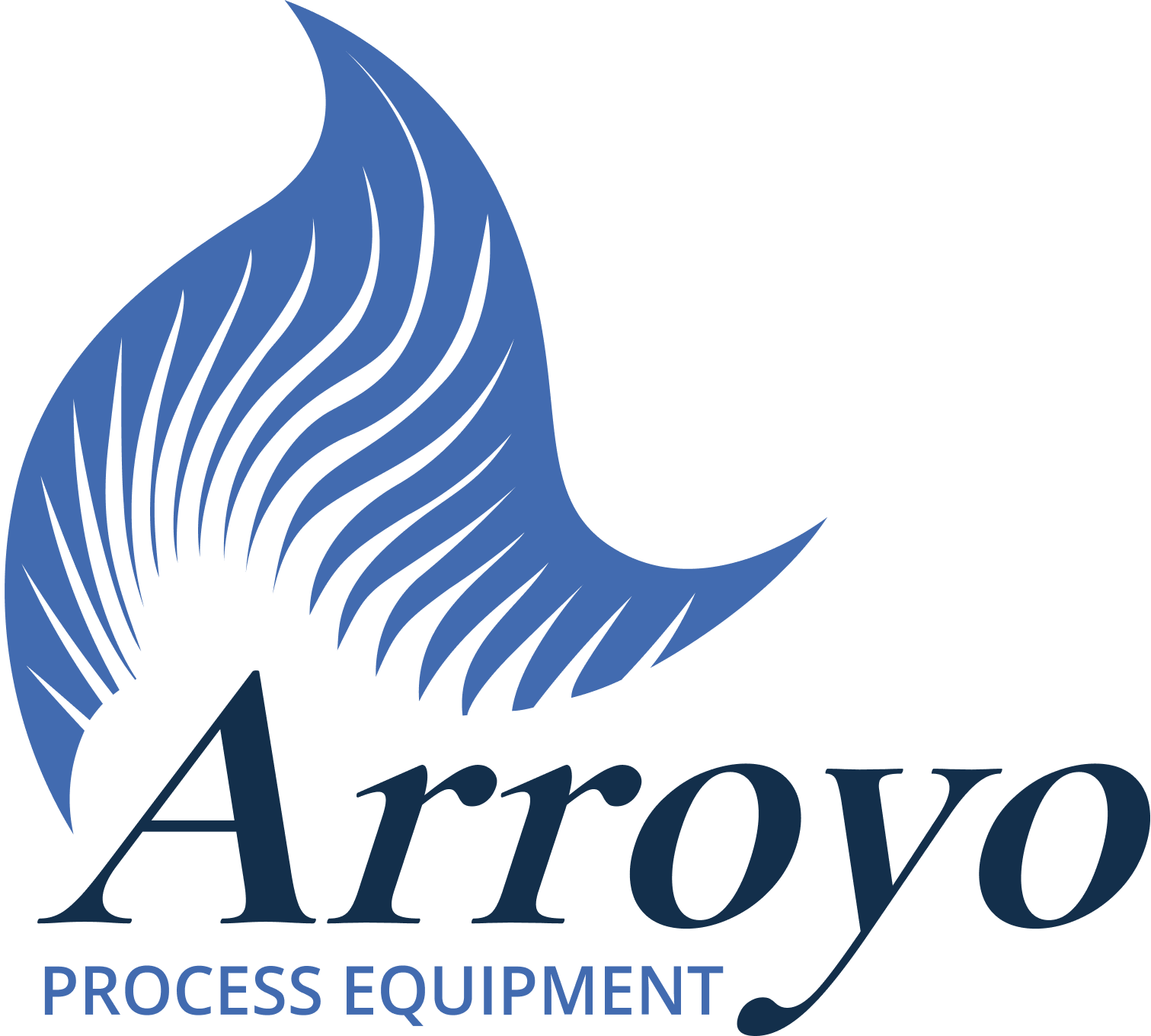
- Industry: Industrial equipment
- Founded: 1968
- Founder: Frank Arroyo, Sr.
- Number of locations: 3 branches (2023)
- Area served: North America, Central America, South America
- Website: https://arroyoprocess.com/

Arroyo Process Equipment is a manufacturing equipment distribution company located in the United States that provides services to North America, Central America and South America. It provides services for process engineering and the supply or service of pumps, mixers, gearboxes, as well as other process equipment to industrial and municipal sectors. These industries include asphalt (bitumen) processing, the chemical industry, pharmaceutical manufacturing, phosphate mining and wastewater treatment among others.

== Background ==
In 1968 Arroyo Process Equipment was founded by Frank Arroyo, Sr. The company was incorporated in Clearwater, FL. In 2016, leadership of the company passed to Frank's daughter, Diane Schleicher. Today, Arroyo Process Equipment has 3 locations in Bartow, Jacksonville, and Miami. On February 10, 2025, Arroyo Process Equipment was acquired by DXP Enterprises Inc., expanding DXP’s presence in the southeastern United States and Latin America.
