= Se7en Wetlands =

Water treatment facility in Florida

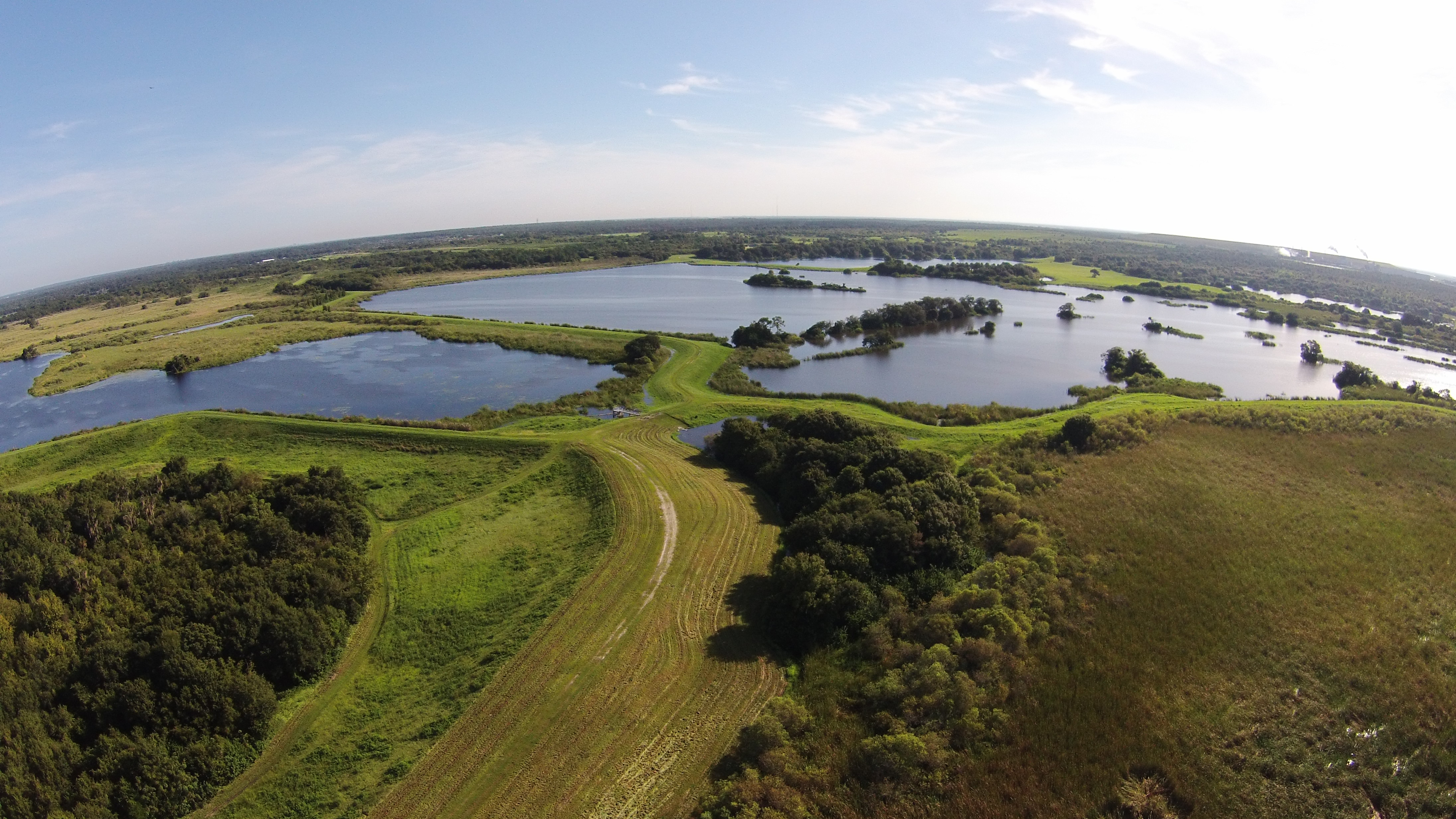

- Location within Florida
- Location: Polk County, Florida
- Nearest city: Lakeland and Mulberry
- Coordinates: 27°54′51″N 81°57′12″W
- Area: 1,640 acres (6.6 km^{2})
- Established: 1987
- Governing body: City of Lakeland

Se7en Wetlands is a City of Lakeland water utility and park, located south of Lakeland, Florida. The public may visit by using one of the two public entrances, located at Loyce E. Harpe Park and Lakeland Highlands Scrub.

== About ==
Se7en Wetlands is a 1,640-acre constructed treatment wetland system that receives all of the City of Lakeland, FL treated wastewater, along with reuse water from Lakeland Electric and reclaimed water from Polk County, Florida. Se7en Wetlands has been in operation as a Water Utility since 1987 and opened in 2018 as a City of Lakeland Park. The property contains uplands, marshes, swamps and lakes. After water leaves Se7en Wetlands, it connects to the Northern Prong of the Alafia River, which connects to Tampa Bay. The Tampa Electric Company beneficially reuses some Se7en Wetlands water at their Polk Power Station.

Two of the seven cells at Se7en Wetlands are open to the public, with 8.5 miles of trails open for hiking. The Gopher Tortoise trail head, accessible through Loyce E. Harpe Park, features a 2.9-mile trail loop, and the Wood Stork trail head, accessible through Lakeland Highlands Scrub, has a 2.4-mile trail loop. Popular activities at Se7en Wetlands include hiking, running, birding, and nature photography. Alcoholic beverages, bicycles and motorized vehicles, fires of any kind, fishing and swimming, boating and camping, hunting and trapping, horses and all pets are prohibited in the park.

Se7en Wetlands is open from 7:00am to 7:00pm daily.

== History ==
Se7en Wetlands was once a part of the Bonny Lake Mine, which was a phosphate mining operation that began in 1947. After the mine closed in 1984, the City of Lakeland purchased the property to be used as a constructed treatment wetland system for final polishing of its wastewater. In 2019, Se7en Wetlands received a state grant for $500,000 in order to build an education center

== Wastewater Treatment ==
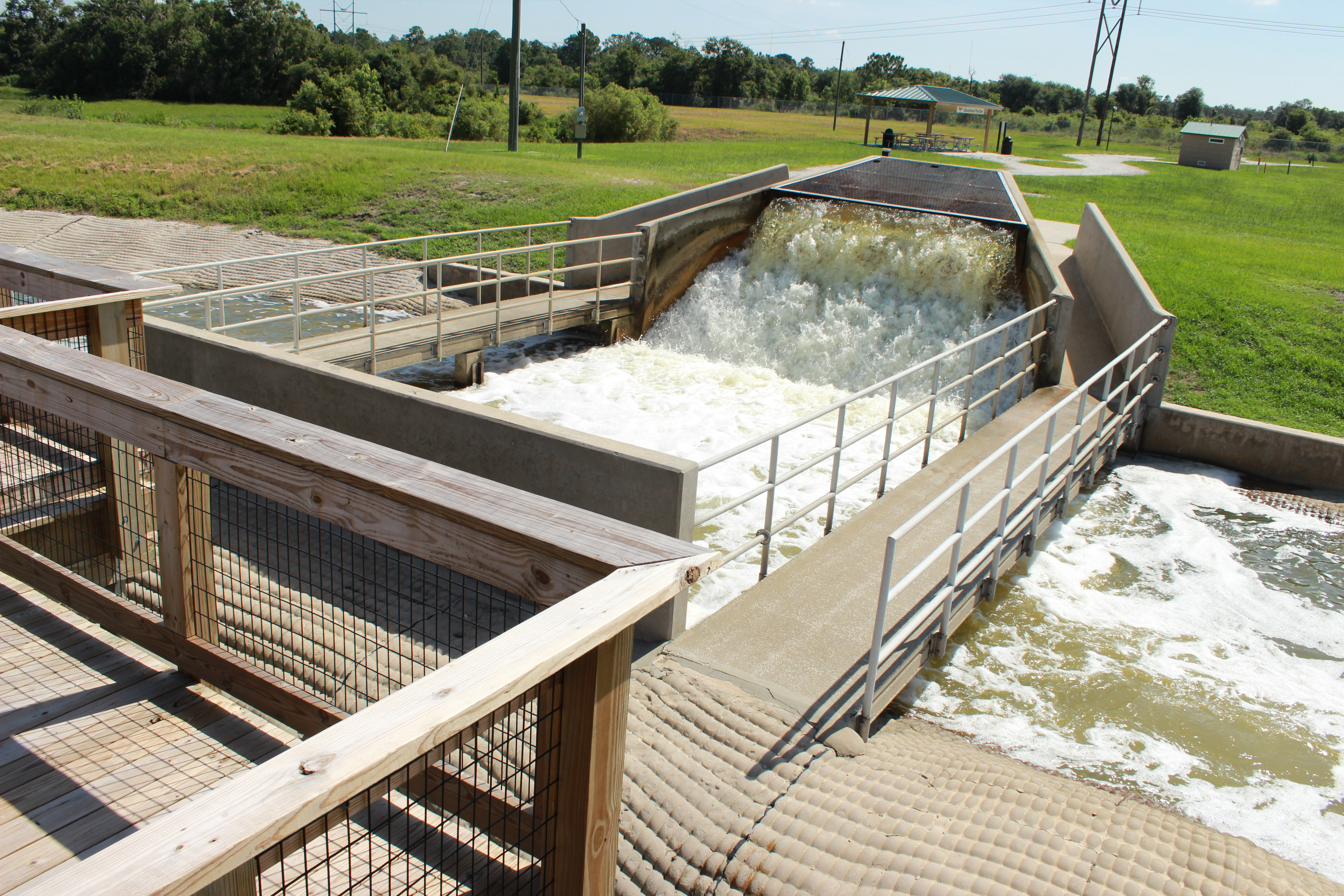
The Influent at Se7en Wetlands

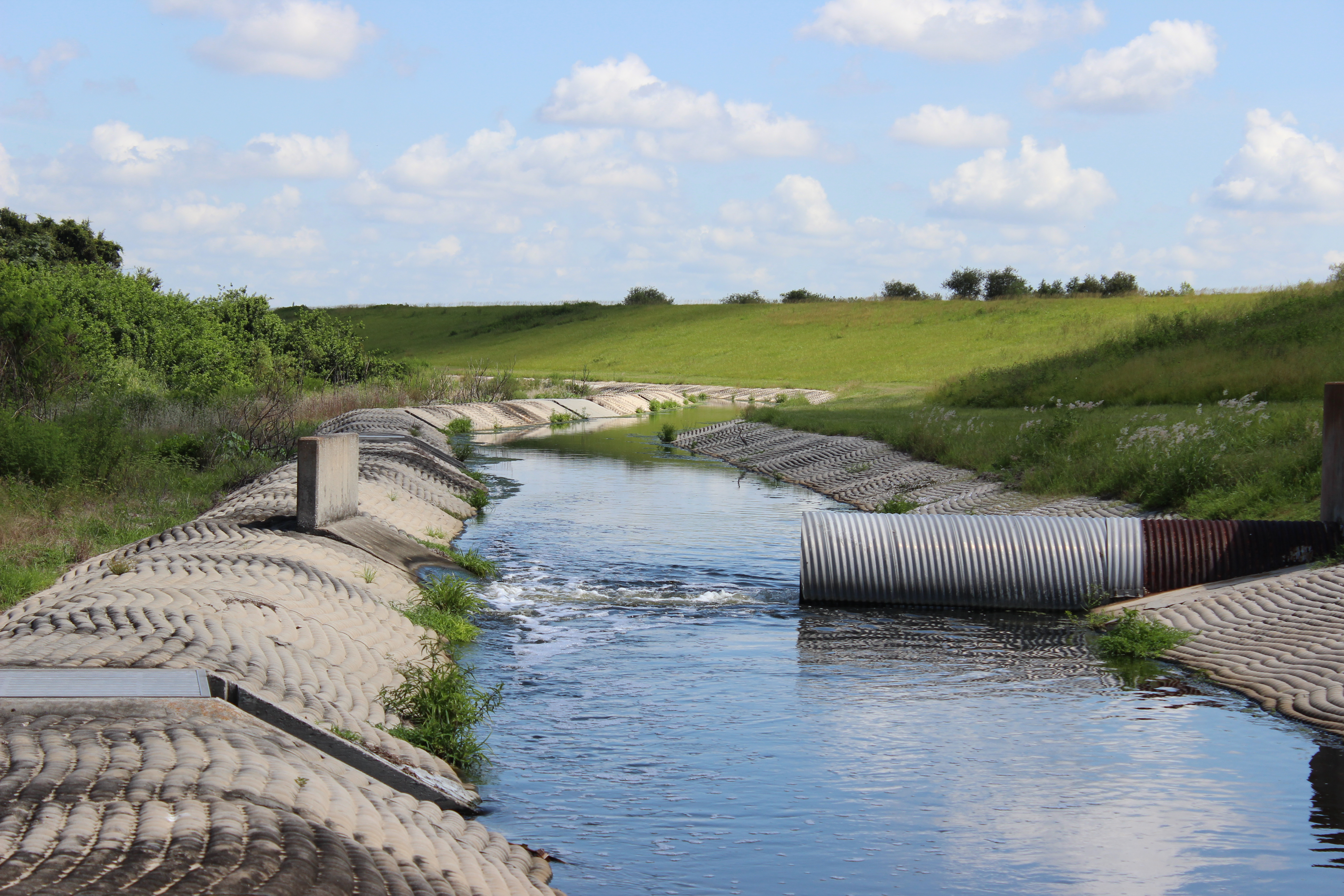
Distribution ditches gently feed water into the wetlands

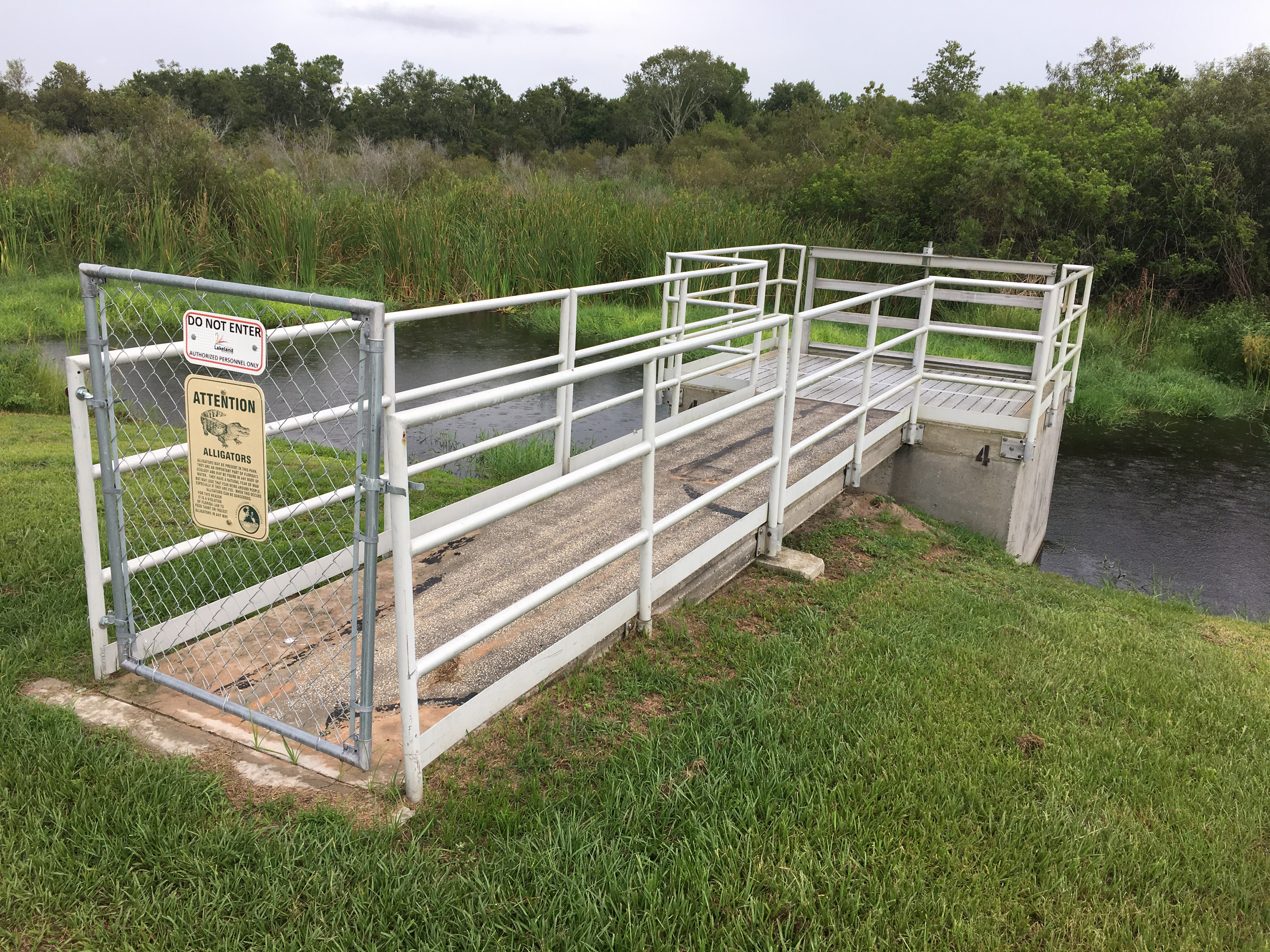
Control structures maintain the flow of water throughout the wetlands

When the City of Lakeland purchased the property for use as a treatment wetland, upgrades were made which included changes to berm elevations and slopes, the installation of water control structures and pipes, and the planting of wetland and upland vegetation. Se7en Wetlands receives approximately 10 million gallons of wastewater a day. The wastewater is then gently fed into the wetlands via distribution ditches, and water levels in the wetland are maintained by control structures. Se7en Wetlands also receives reclaimed water that has not been used for irrigation, from Polk County. As the water flows through Se7en Wetlands, nutrients such as nitrogen and phosphorus are removed by the planted vegetation and microbes that exist in the environment. The slow flow of the water allows suspended sediments and pollutants to sink into the soil at the bottom.

== Habitats ==
=== Uplands ===
The upland areas at Se7en Wetlands are filled with pines (Pinus), oaks (Quercus), wildflowers and grasses, as well as gopher tortoises (Gopherus polyphemus), butterflies (Lepidoptera), and numerous species of songbirds.

=== Marsh ===
Marshes are areas in Florida where the soil is saturated for most of the year, usually topped with water. Soft-stemmed plants, like cattails (Typha), root in the soil and emerge out of the water. Marshes are high in nutrients and the neutral pH allows for an abundance of plant and animal life.

=== Lakes ===
Both the shallow and deep water lakes at Se7en Wetlands are home to many fish and bird species. The lake islands, left over from phosphate mining, have been colonized with plants and are used by nesting birds, such as Wood Stork, to rear their young.

== Wildlife ==
A variety of different species can be found at Se7en Wetlands. The American alligator, wood stork, and bobcat are common. An ongoing species list can be found at the Se7en Wetlands project in iNaturalist.

== Gallery ==
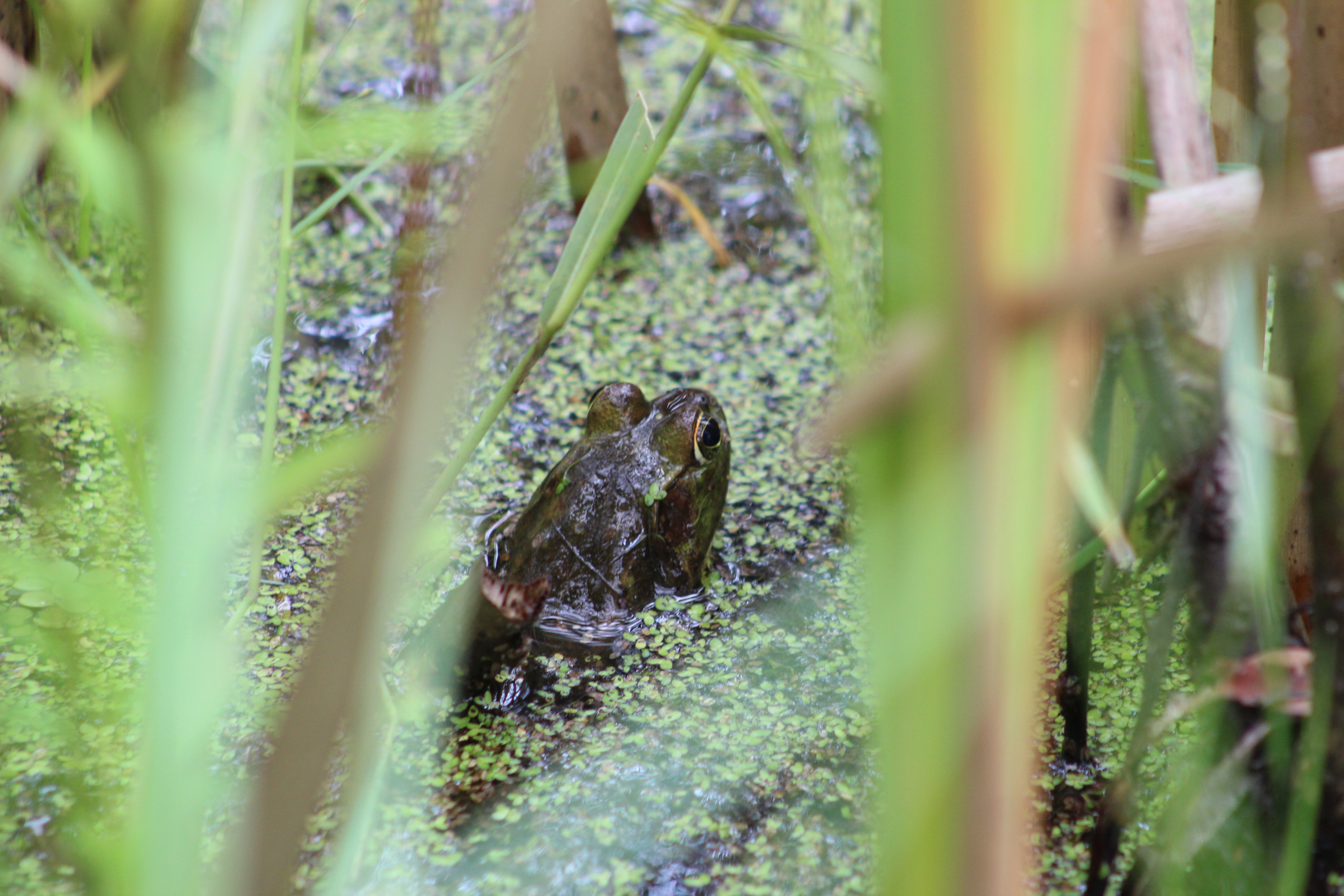
Pig frog

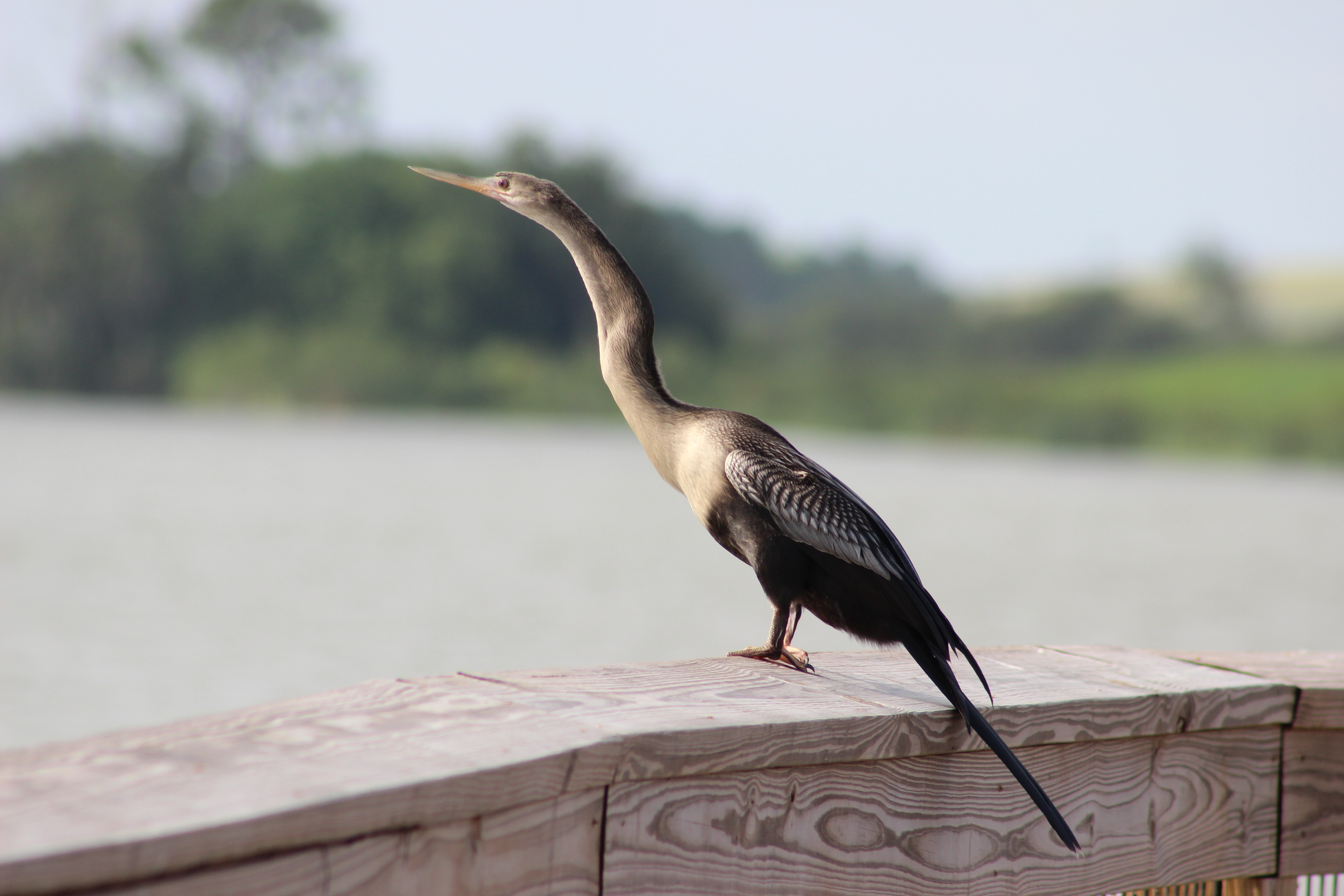
Anhinga

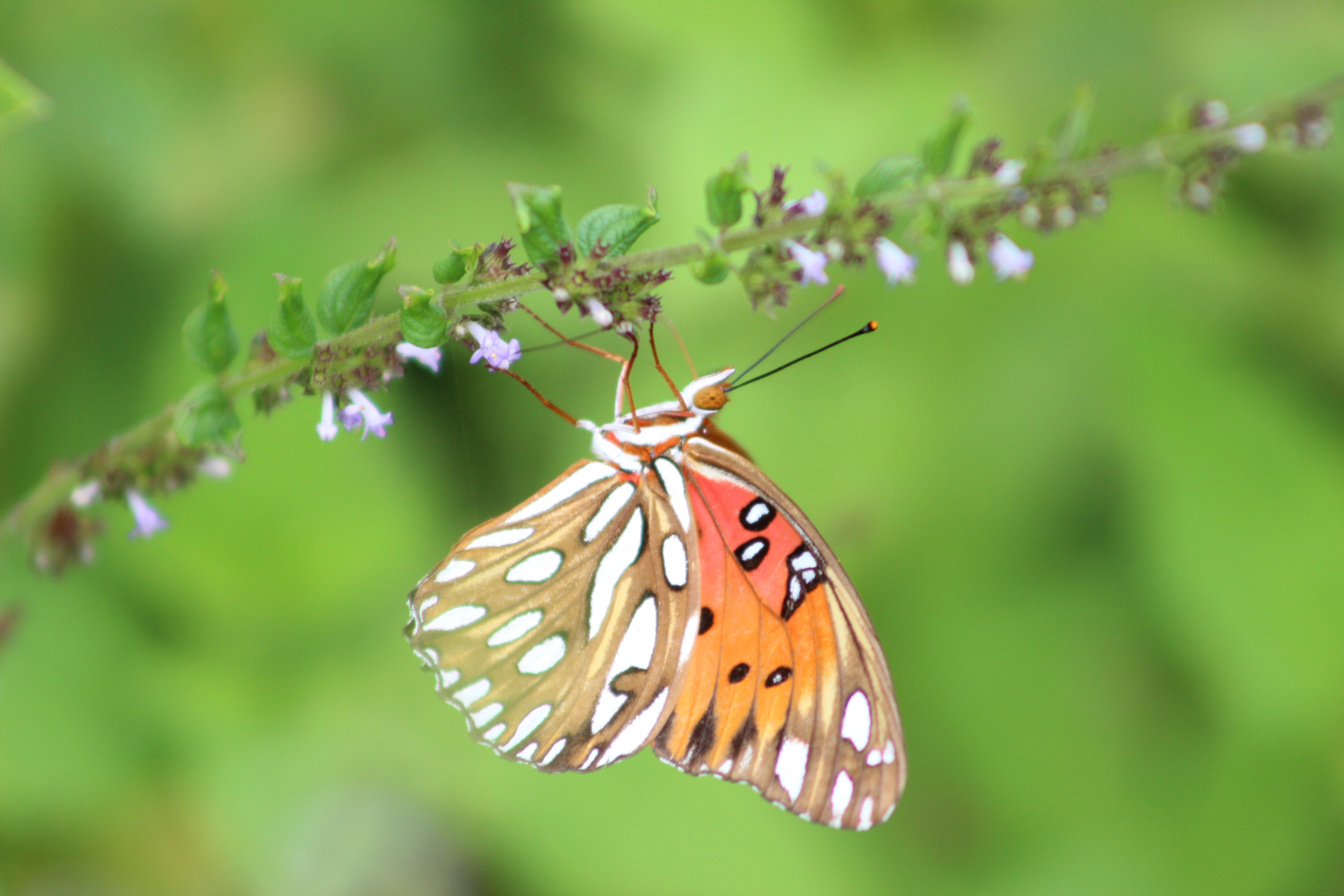
Gulf Fritillary

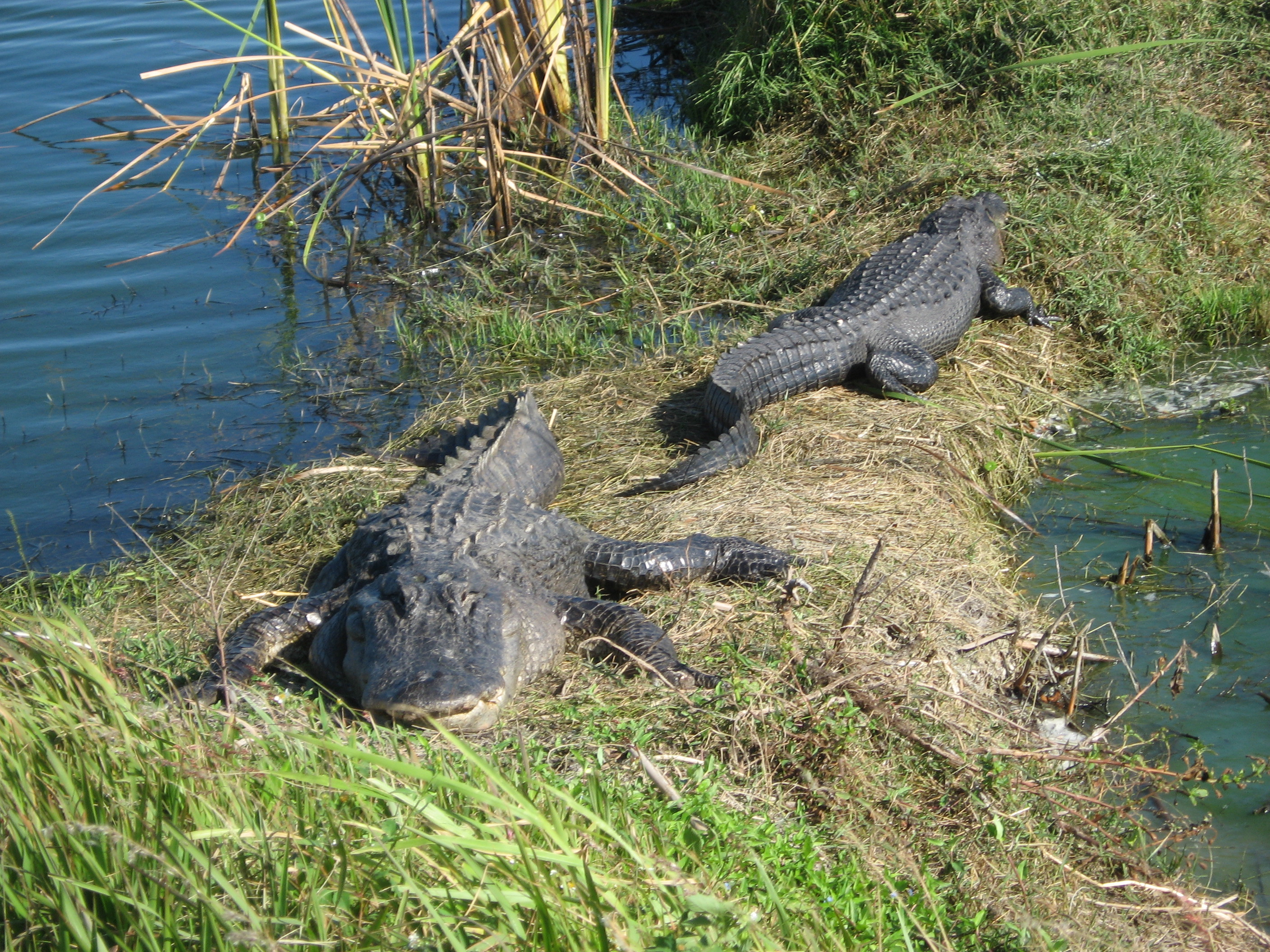
American Alligator
