= Phosphate mining in the United States =

Phosphate Mining Districts

In 2015, 27.6 million metric tons of marketable phosphate rock, or phosphorite, was mined in the United States, making the US the world's third-largest producer, after China and Morocco. The phosphate mining industry employed 2,200 people. The value of phosphate rock mined was US$2.2 billion.

As of 2015, there are 10 active phosphate mines in four states: Florida, North Carolina, Idaho, and Utah. The eastern phosphate deposits are mined from open pits. The western deposits are mined from both surface and underground mines.

The exact phosphate content of the phosphate rock mined in 2015 is not available, but in the latest five-year period for which ore grades are available, 2009-2013, the grade of US phosphate rock varied from 28.5 to 29.0 percent P_{2}O_{5}.

As of 2016, remaining reserves of phosphate rock in the United States totaled 1.1 billion metric tons.

== Industry structure ==
As of 2017, there were 11 active phosphate mines in the US, operated by 5 companies. In addition, one mine in Idaho was in permitting and development status.

Phosphate mining operations in the US

Company	Name	Location
Itafos Conda LLC	Rasmussen Ridge	Caribou County, Idaho
JR Simplot	Vernal	Vernal, Utah
JR Simplot	Smoky Canyon	Caribou County, Idaho
Bayer	South Rasmussen	Caribou County, Idaho
Bayer	Blackfoot Bridge	Caribou County, Idaho
The Mosaic Company	DeSoto (permitting)	DeSoto County, Florida
The Mosaic Company	Wingate Creek	Manatee County, Florida
The Mosaic Company	Ona	Ona, Florida
The Mosaic Company	South Pasture (Currently idled)	Hardee County, Florida
The Mosaic Company	Four Corners	Hillsborough, Manatee, and Polk counties, Florida
The Mosaic Company	South Fort Meade	Hardee and Polk counties, Florida
Nutrien Ltd	Swift Creek	Hamilton County, Florida
Nutrien	Aurora mine	Aurora, North Carolina
Fertoz Ltd.	Butte Mine	Butte, Montana
Itafos (previously Stonegate Agricom)	Paris Hills (permitting)	Paris, Idaho

=== Processing ===
Many phosphate processing plants are located at the mines. In addition, some processing plants are located remote from the mines. Some processes import phosphate rock.

== Use ==
Phosphorus is an essential component of fertilizer. In 2013, about 90 percent of phosphate rock was used in fertilizer manufacture. Other uses included animal feed and detergents. Some phosphate rock is manufactured into elemental phosphorus, specifically white phosphorus, for munitions.

== Geography ==
The states mining phosphate rock as of early 2016 were, in descending order of tonnage mined: Florida, North Carolina, Idaho, and Utah. In 2016, 65 percent of US phosphate was mined in Florida.

=== Central Florida / Bone Valley / Florida Land-Pebble ===
The Bone Valley mining district, also known as the Central Florida district, or the Florida Land-Pebble district, is centered in Polk County, Florida, and extends into Hardee, Hillsborough, and Manatee counties. As of 2013, phosphate was being extracted from five mines in the district, all operated by Mosaic.

=== Florida Hard Rock ===
The Florida Hard Rock district mines phosphate from a belt up to 30 miles (48 km) wide and 150 miles (240 km) long, extending from Tallahassee on the west to Pasco County on the east. Phosphate deposits occur in Bradford County, Hamilton, and Union counties.

One mine is currently operating in the Hard Rock district: The Swift Creek mine, operated by Nutrien Ltd, in Hamilton County, Florida.

=== Beaufort County, North Carolina ===
The North Carolina phosphate deposit was discovered in 1955. Phosphate is currently being extracted at the Aurora mine, operated by Nutrien Ltd.

=== South Carolina ===
The first large-scale phosphate mining in the US were in the vicinity of Charleston, South Carolina, in Charleston, Colleton, and Beaufort counties. Mining started in 1868 and continued until 1938.

=== Tennessee ===
Mining started in the central Tennessee phosphate district in 1896. Counties where mining took place included Giles, Hickman, Maury, and Williamson. The district has been inactive since 1991. It is regarded as largely exhausted.

=== Western region, Phosphoria Formation ===
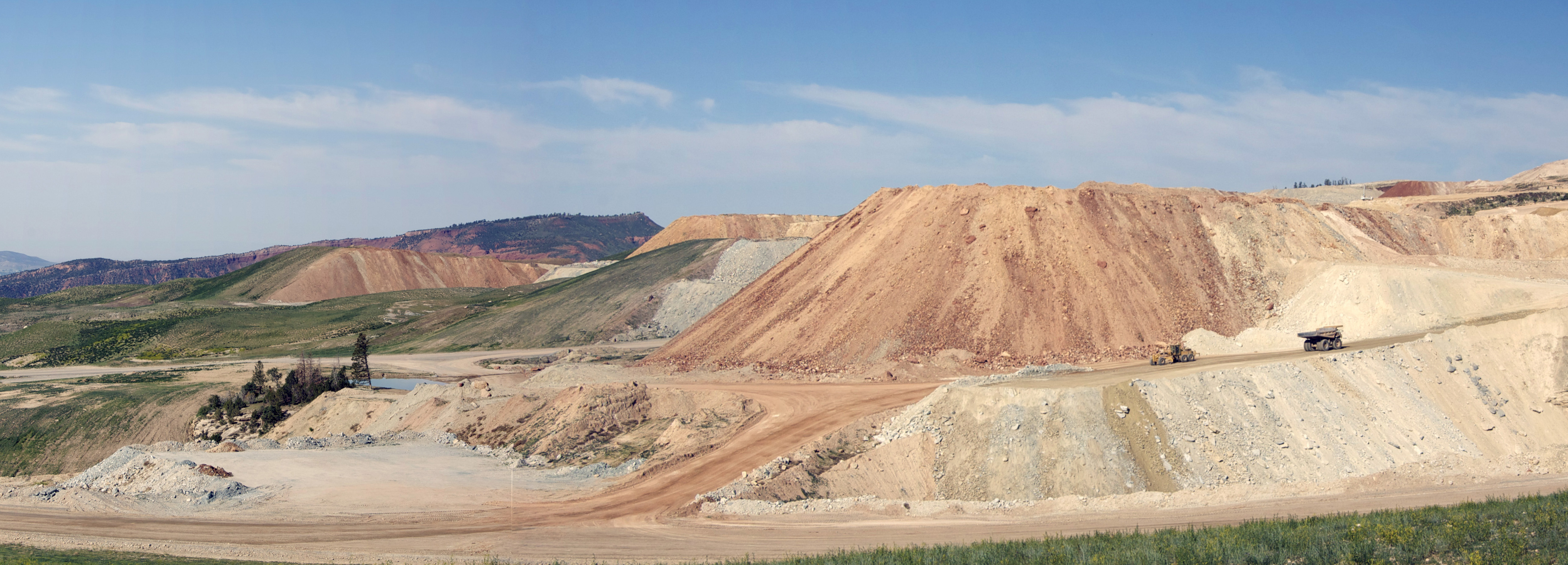
Phosphate mine near Flaming Gorge, Utah, 2008

Parts of the Phosphoria Formation of the western United States carry economic grades of phosphorus. The Phosphoria has been mined in a wide area stretching north-south from southwest Montana, through western Wyoming and southeast Idaho, and into northeast Utah.

There are currently four active mines in Caribou County, Idaho, and one being permitted in Bear Lake County, Idaho.

Phosphate rock from the JR Simplot mine near Vernal, Utah, is crushed at the mine, then transferred in a slurry pipeline to the company's processing plant at Rock Springs, Wyoming.

Phosphate rock was formerly mined in Beaverhead, Granite, Powell, and Silver Bow counties in southwest Montana. The last operating phosphate mine in Montana, at Garrison, shut down in 1993. Phosphate was also formerly mined in Lincoln County, Wyoming.

== Geology ==
Although some igneous rocks have economic grades of phosphate, no igneous phosphate rock is mined in the US. Small amounts of phosphate were mined from igneous apatite deposits in Virginia, New Jersey, and New York. But since 1948, all phosphate deposits mined in the US have been sedimentary deposits. However, a small amount of phosphate was produced in the 1970s, as a byproduct of iron mining in Missouri.

Most phosphate mining is of sedimentary phosphorite, a phosphorus-rich deposit formed under shallow marine conditions. However, a number of US phosphate deposits occur where the original marine-deposited phosphate minerals have been concentrated by weathering and redeposition, often under nonmarine conditions.

=== Bone Valley, Florida ===
The largest source of US phosphate is the Bone Valley, or Central Florida mining district, which produces from the Pliocene-age Bone Valley Formation.

=== Florida Hard Rock ===
The Florida Hard Rock district mines phosphate from the Alachua Formation of Pliocene age. The Alachua Formation is nonmarine and consists of sediments rich in phosphate that was weathered from the Hawthorne Formation of Miocene age.

=== North Carolina ===
The North Carolina phosphate deposit occurs in the Pungo River Formation of Miocene age. The phosphate was deposited under shallow marine conditions.

=== South Carolina ===
The South Carolina river-pebble deposits formed along modern rivers which reworked and concentrated lower-grade phosphate deposits.

=== Tennessee ===
Three classes of phosphate deposits have been mined in central Tennessee; in order of decreasing importance: brown phosphate rock, blue phosphate rock, and white phosphate rock.

The most important phosphate deposits were the so-called brown phosphate rock, mined from Ordovician limestones, some parts of which are rich in phosphate. The highest-grade deposits were found where weathering or shallow groundwater had preferentially dissolved away the calcium carbonate. The last mine in Tennessee, which produced phosphate rock from the Bigby-Cannon formation, closed in 1991.

The blue phosphate rock was found in the Devonian-age Chattanooga Shale.

Minor phosphate production was mined from white phosphate rock, which formed in karsted Silurian limestones.

=== Western US, Phosphoria ===
The western deposits, in Utah, Wyoming, Idaho, and Montana, are in the Phosphoria Formation of Permian age. The phosphate deposits occur in two members of the Phosphoria: the Retort phosphatic shale member in the upper part of the formation, and the Meade Peak phosphatic shale member in the lower part of the formation.

=== Northeast Utah Mississippian ===
Although not presently mined, phosphate deposits occur in the Brazer limestone of Mississippian age in Utah.

== History ==
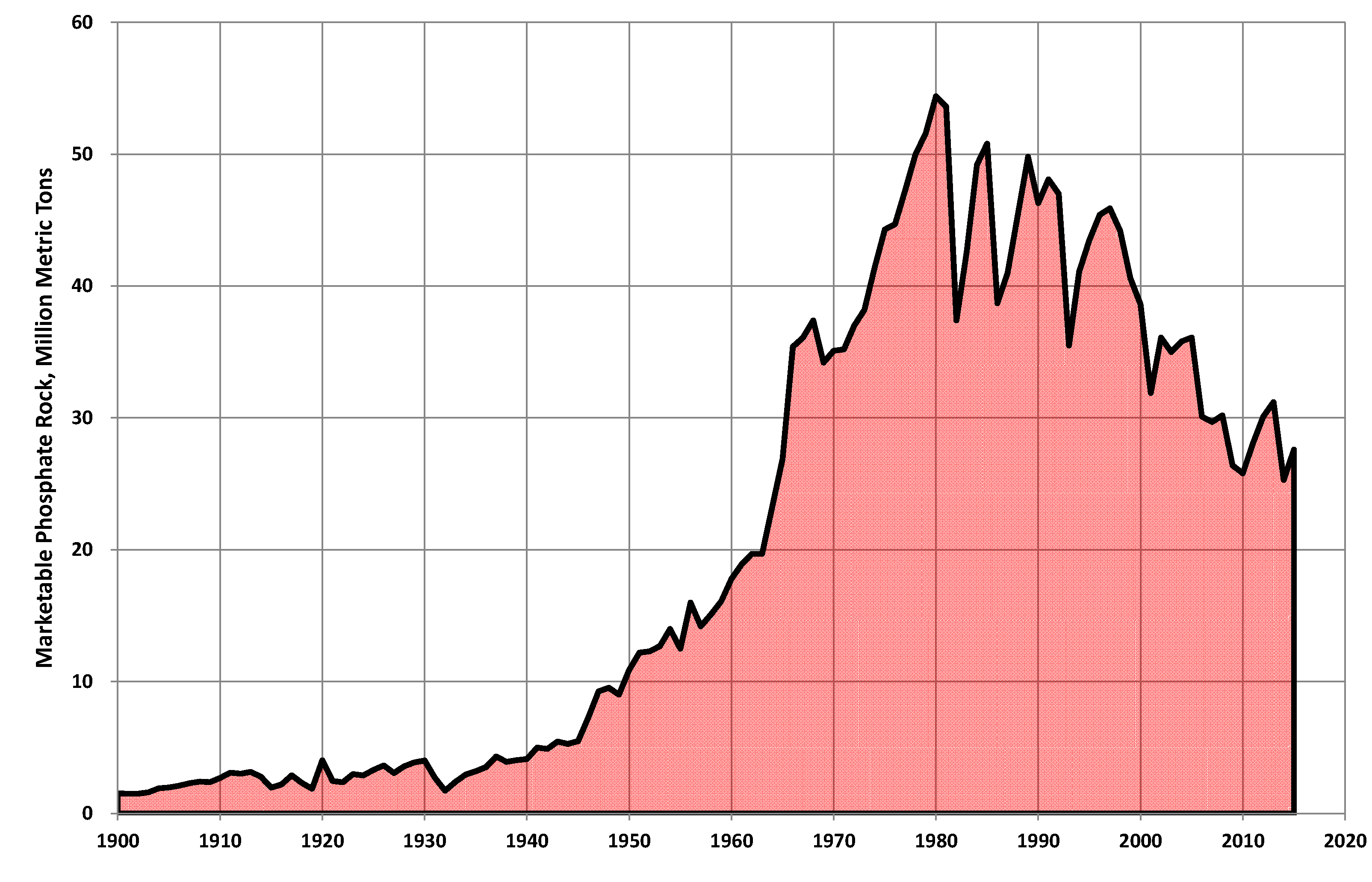
Phosphate rock mined in the United States, 1900-2015 (data from US Geological Survey)

Large-scale phosphate mining in the US began in 1868 in coastal South Carolina. Access to river transport and proximity to the port of Charleston encouraged exports, and by 1885 South Carolina was producing half the world's phosphate. Phosphate mining in South Carolina declined rapidly in the 1890s, when mining of the higher-grade deposits in central Florida began. The central Florida district has provided the majority of US phosphate ever since.

US production of phosphate rock peaked in 1980 at 54.4 million metric tons. The United States was the world's largest producer of phosphate rock from at least 1900, up until 2006, when US production was exceeded by that of China. In 2015, the US produced 12 percent of the world's phosphate rock.

== Environmental impacts ==
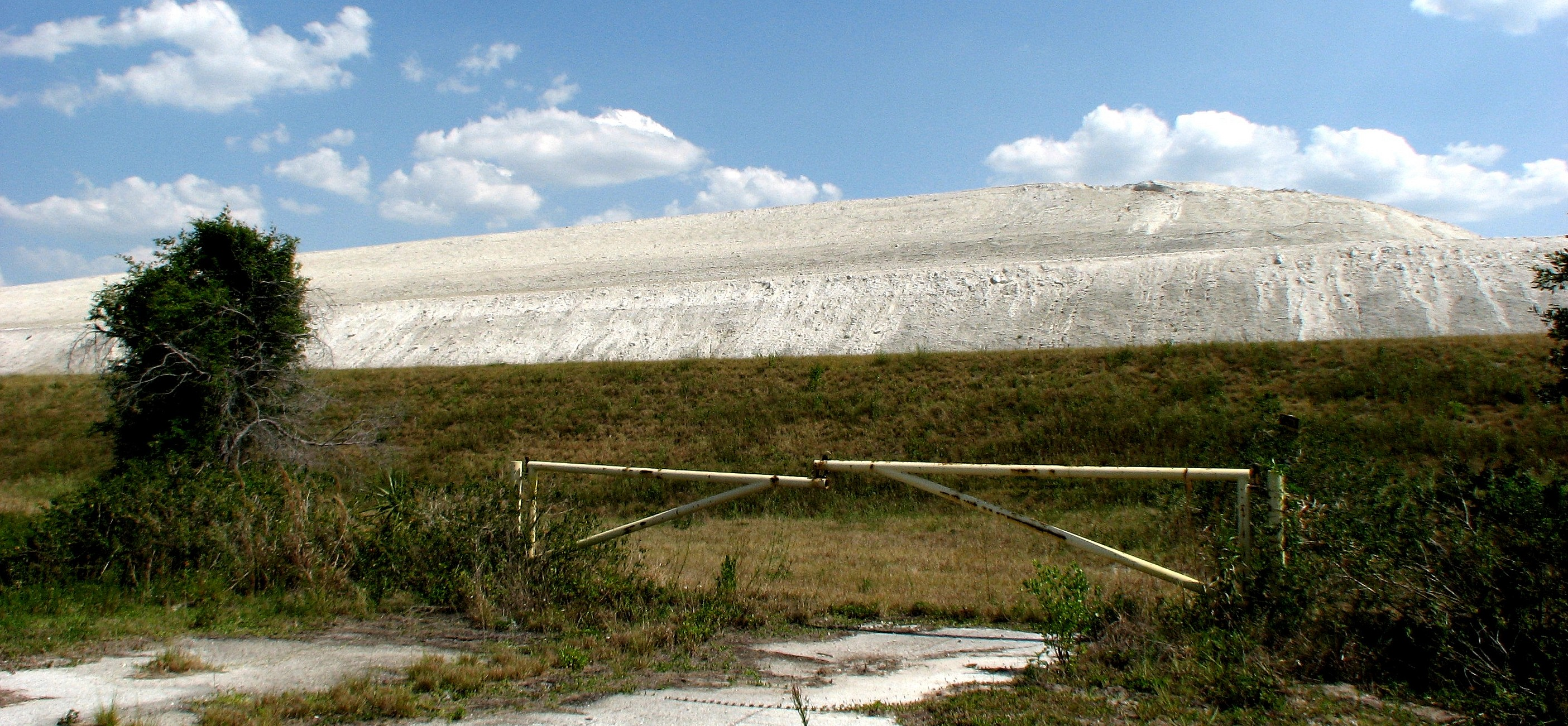
Large pile of phosphogypsum waste near Fort Meade, Florida.

For each ton of phosphoric acid produced by the processing of phosphate rock, five tons of waste are generated. This waste takes the form of impure, useless, radioactive solid called phosphogypsum. Somewhere between 100,000,000 and 280,000,000 tons of phosphogypsum waste is estimated to be produced annually worldwide.

These tailings piles and related ponds and dams can be sources of toxic chemicals, and are vulnerable to breach. For example, the 2021 Piney Point phosphate plant dam breach is predicted to have significant negative impacts on Tampa Bay.

== Byproducts ==
=== Fluoride ===
Phosphorite typically contains more than 3% fluoride, in the mineral fluorapatite. Only a small amount is recovered.

In 2015, fluorosilicic acid equivalent to 114,000 tons of fluorite (fluorspar) was produced as a byproduct of phosphate rock processing. This material represented nearly all the US production of fluoride, which is subsequently converted to fluorine. The produced fluorine is used to prepare polymers, pharmaceuticals, etc.

=== Uranium ===
The phosphorite deposits of Florida and of the western states contain from 0.005 to 0.02 percent uranium. Phosphorite deposits contain sufficient uranium to be an economic source when the price of uranium is high.

Uranium was extracted at two phosphate plants in the central Florida district from 1952 to 1961, and at seven plants during the period 1976-1998. The average uranium recovery was about 0.9 pounds (0.41 kg) triuranium octoxide (U_{3}O_{8}) per metric ton of P_{2}O_{5}. However, uranium recovery is feasible only from the process that produces double superphosphate; most phosphate is processed into normal superphosphate, a process not amenable to uranium recovery.

Although no uranium has been recovered from US phosphate plants since 1998, the Central Florida phosphate deposits remain North America's largest uranium resource, containing an estimated one million tons of uranium.

=== Vanadium ===
Some parts of the Phosphoria Formation, which is mined for phosphate in the western US, contain potentially economic concentrations of vanadium. In 2008, Rocky Mountain Resources announced that they had defined 6.7 million tons of ore containing 0.88 percent V_{2}O_{5}, at its Paris Hills prospect. The vanadium occurred in an 11-foot-thick (3.4 m) bed in the Meade Peak shale member of the Phosphoria, immediately below a 15-foot (4.6 m) bed of ore-grade phosphate rock. The property has since been sold to Stonegate Agricom, and as of mid-2016 was still in permitting and development status.

As of 2015, no vanadium was being recovered from US phosphate operations.

== International trade ==
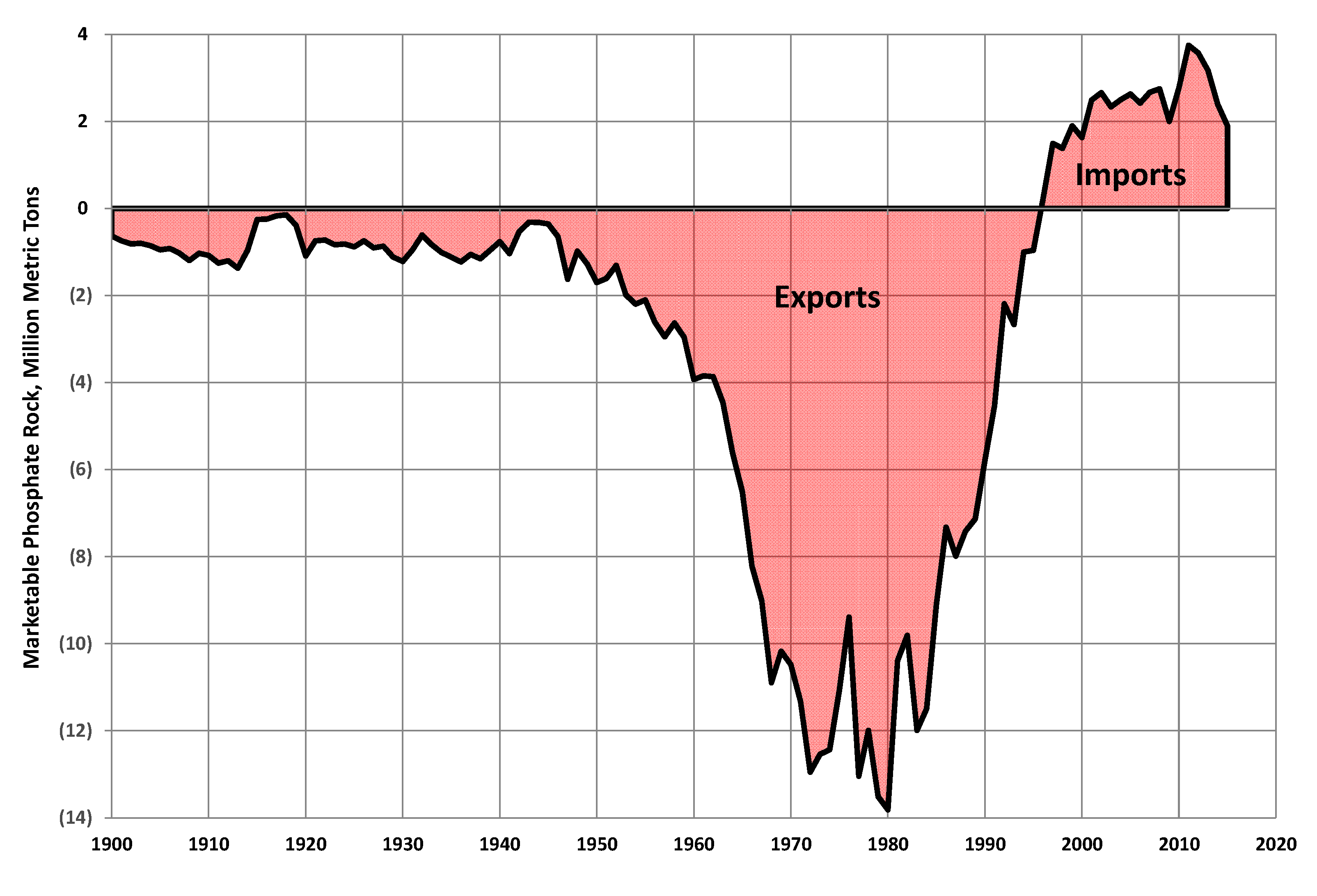
Annual net imports (positive) and net exports (negative) into the United States of phosphate rock, 1900-2015 (data from US Geological Survey)

The US was a long-time exporter of phosphate rock, and from the 1960s into the 1990s a major exporter. The US became a net importer of phosphate rock for the first time in 1996. Since then the US has been a net importer each year. In 2015, the US imported about 12 percent of the phosphate it used.

== See also ==
- Peak phosphorus
