= Richard Coffey =

American basketball player (born 1965)

Personal information
- Born: September 2, 1965 (age 61) Aurora, North Carolina, U.S.
- Listed height: 6 ft 6 in (1.98 m)
- Listed weight: 212 lb (96 kg)

Career information
- High school: Aurora (Aurora, North Carolina)
- College: Minnesota (1986–1990)
- NBA draft: 1990: undrafted
- Position: Small forward
- Number: 33

Career history
- 1990–1991: Minnesota Timberwolves
- Stats at NBA.com
- Stats at Basketball Reference

Richard Lee Coffey (born September 2, 1965) is an American former professional basketball player who had a brief stint with the National Basketball Association's Minnesota Timberwolves.

Prior to his college basketball career he was a member of the US Army's 82nd Airborne Division Paratrooper.

Coffey, a 6'6" and 212 lb forward born in Aurora, North Carolina and who played collegiately for the University of Minnesota Golden Gophers, averaged 1.3 points and 1.5 rebounds in 52 games for the Timberwolves during the 1990–91 NBA season. After leaving the NBA, he played in the Continental Basketball Association, in Turkey and Spain. He played for the Isuzu Motors Lynx of Japan in 1993.

He is the father of Amir Coffey who plays in the Israeli Basketball Premier League and played in the NBA, Nia Coffey, and Sydney Coffey.
