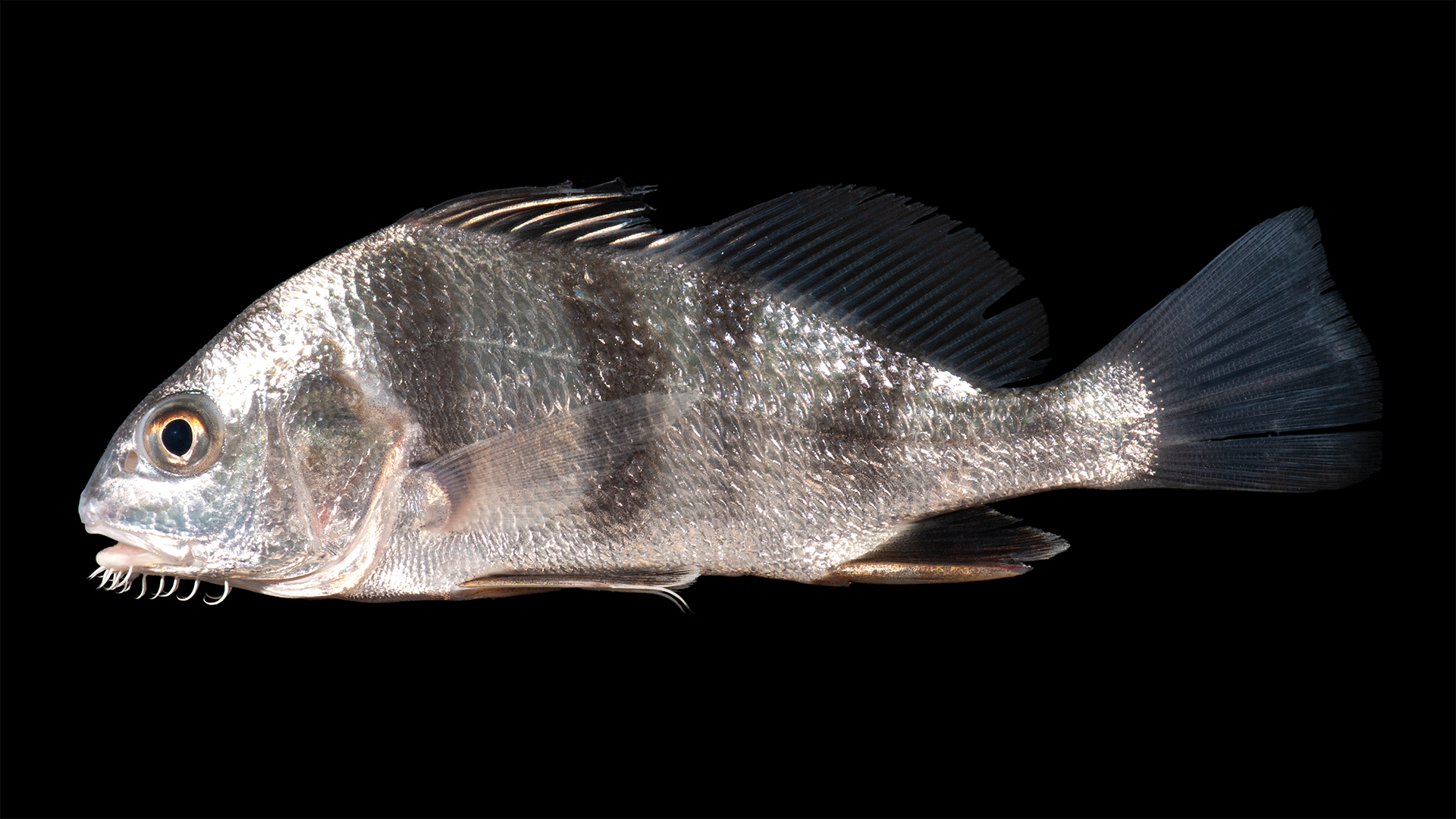

Conservation status
- Least Concern (IUCN 3.1)

Scientific classification
- Kingdom: Animalia
- Phylum: Chordata
- Class: Actinopterygii
- Division: Teleostei
- Order: Acanthuriformes
- Family: Sciaenidae
- Genus: Pogonias
- Species: P. cromis

Binomial name
- Pogonias cromis (Linnaeus, 1766)

Synonyms
- Labris cromis Linnaeus, 1766; Pogonias fasciatus Lacépède, 1801; Sciaena fusca Mitchill, 1815; Mugil gigas Mitchill, 1814; Mugil grunniens Mitchill, 1814

= Black drum =

Species of fish

The black drum (Pogonias cromis), also known as the drum or drummer, is a species of marine ray-finned fish belonging to the family Sciaenidae, the drums and croakers. It is found in the western Atlantic Ocean off the eastern coast of North and South America. Though most specimens are generally found in the 5-30 lb (2–14 kg) range, the largest black drum was just over 113 lb (51 kg), while in Argentina in 1971, a 48 kg black drum was captured. They are often black and/or gray in color with juvenile fish having distinctive dark stripes over a gray body. Their teeth are rounded and they have powerful jaws capable of crushing oysters and other shellfish. Black drum are capable of producing tones between 100 Hz and 500 Hz when performing mating calls.

Black drum over 15 pounds (6.8 kg) should be released, as their flesh is very coarse and tough.

== Taxonomy ==
The black drum was first formally described as Labrus cromis by Carl Linnaeus in 1766 with one of its type localities given as Carolina. In 1801, the Bernard Germain de Lacépède described a new species, Pogonias fasciatus, without giving a type locality, but it is thought to be Charleston, South Carolina, and placed it a new monospecific genus, Pogonias. This taxon is a junior synonym of Linnaeus's Labrus cromis. This species was thought to have an antitropical distribution, but in 2019, the South American population was recognized as a valid species Pogonias courbina, originally described as Pogonathus courbina by Lacépède in 1803. The genus Pogonias has been placed in the subfamily Sciaeninae by some workers, but the 5th edition of Fishes of the World does not recognise subfamilies within the Sciaenidae, which it places in the order Acanthuriformes.

== Habits, distribution, and characteristics ==
The black drum is usually found in or near brackish waters. Larger, older fish are more commonly found in the saltier areas of an estuary (closer to the ocean) near oyster beds or other plentiful food sources. Juvenile fish have four or five bold, vertical, black bars on a light background and can be mistaken for sheepshead at first glance, but are distinguished on closer inspection because sheepshead have teeth and black drum have chin barbels. These stripes usually fade to dull gray as the fish grow from 12 to 24 inches (30 to 61 cm) in length. Juvenile fish are more commonly found in less salty areas and relate more strongly to structure and cover. In the western Atlantic, black drum are found from Nova Scotia to Florida, the Gulf of Mexico, the Antilles (uncommon), and the southern Caribbean coast. They are common between the Delaware Bay and Florida coasts, and most abundant along the Texas coast. After reaching maturity by the end of their second year, black drum spawn in and around estuarine waters. In Texas, most spawning takes place in February and March.

== Feeding ==
Black drum larvae eat mostly zooplankton, and young black drum (less than 20 cm long) eat worms and small fish. Black drum are mostly bottom feeders, with adults eating mostly mollusks and crabs. In shallow water, they have been reported to feed with their heads down so that their tails show above the water surface. Their sensitive chin barbels help locate food and strong pharyngeal teeth crush the shells of these preferred foods. In captivity, large drum reportedly were able to eat more than two commercial-sized oysters per kilogram of body weight each day. This translates into the potential for a 20 kg drum (about 45 lb) to eat 40 oysters a day. Fishing advice for black drum along the east and southeast coasts of the United States often includes the suggestion to locate an oyster bed. This preference, though, has also caused black drum to be a nuisance for those who raise oysters commercially. A group of black drum can do great damage to an oyster bed in a single day.

Black drum forage habits
Age	Length	Forage
Larvae		feed largely on zooplankton
Young	80 – 200 mm	small fish (36%) polychaetes (32%) and other invertebrates such as copepods, annelids, and amphipods
Adult	210 – 500 mm	mollusks (33% Mulinia transversa corbuloides)
Adult	longer than 500 mm	mostly mollusks (74%) and crabs, shrimp, and aquatic vegetation depending on location

== Growth ==
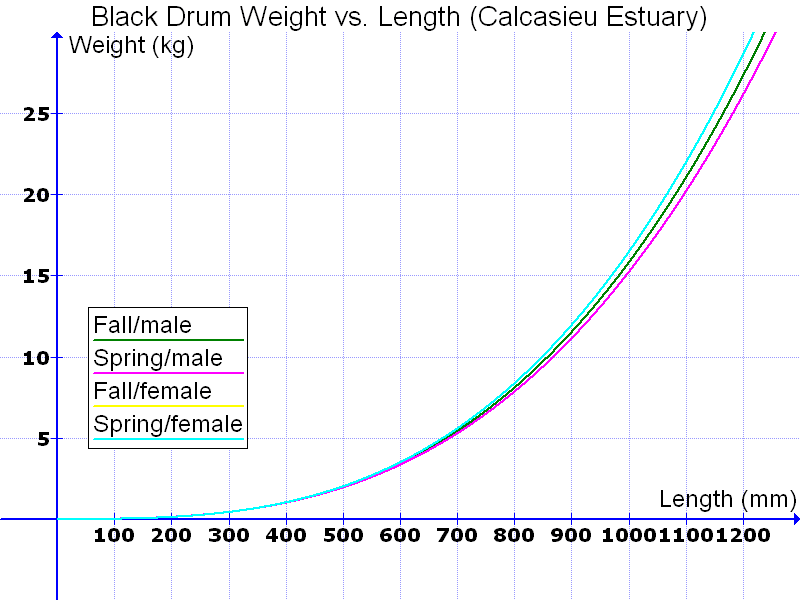
Weight vs. length for black drum based on data from the Calcasieu Estuary, Louisiana (Fall female curve is obscured by the spring female curve, data are from Jenkins, 2004)

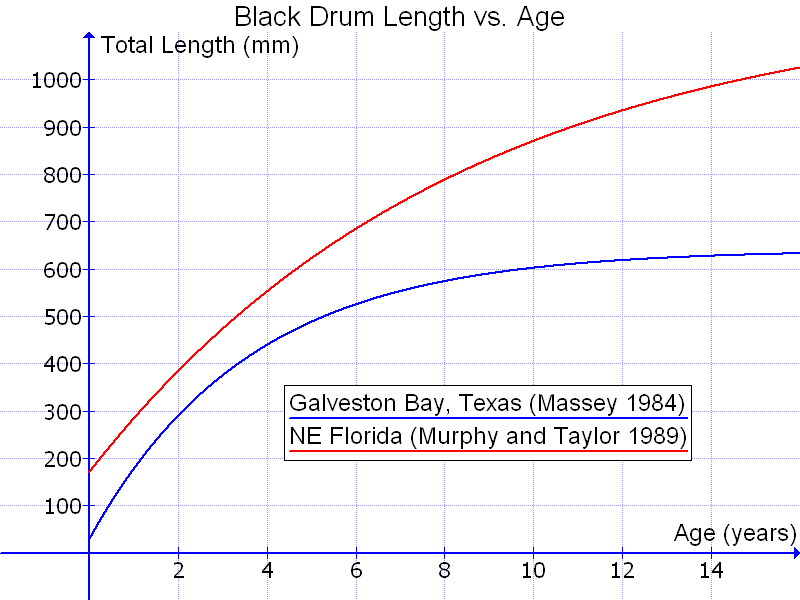
Length vs. age for black drum from two Gulf Coast locations

Annual growth rate for ages 1–3 is 100–150 mm/year and then slows to 10–50 mm/year for ages 10–20. Studies have reported black drum weighing more than 60 kg on the Atlantic Coast, and they are believed to live up to 60 years. Other studies suggest that black drum in the Gulf of Mexico do not grow as large or live as long; in a sample of 1357 black drum from coastal Louisiana, the largest individual was 22.6 kg and the oldest was 44 years.

The length vs. age graph shows how the typical length of black drum increases with age. The weight vs. length graph shows how the typical weight of black drum increases with length; small differences during different seasons have been measured as shown. This kind of information can be used to estimate weight based on length. More scientifically, it can be used to determine whether a given sample of black drum is above or below expected weight, which may be related to a number of environmental conditions.

== Fishing ==
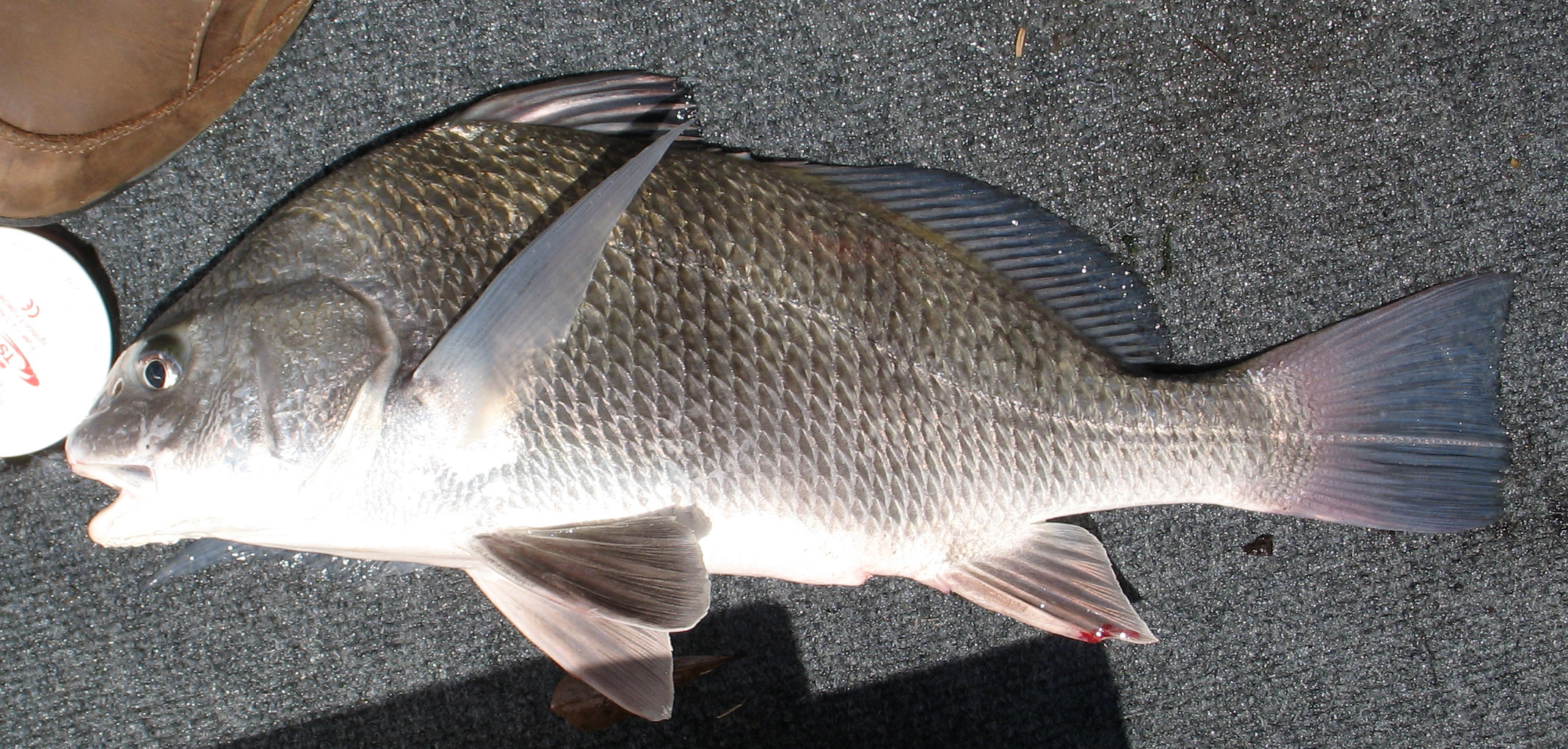
Black drum caught in Lake Pontchartrain

Black drum are bottom feeders, so they are most commonly caught with bait either on the bottom or suspended within a few feet of the bottom. Bottom-fishing methods are used both in surf and inshore fishing. Shrimp is a typical bait that works well; squid can also be used and is less subject to bait stealing by hardhead catfish and Atlantic croakers, which often frequent the same waters. Sometimes, older, larger fish are more readily caught on a half or a quarter of a blue crab with the top shell removed and cut or broken to fit on a 4/0 to 9/0 hook. This type of fishing is often combined with chumming, a baiting practice that involves scattering bits of fish parts and blood into the water as an attractant. Black drum also are caught on spoons and jigs.

One researcher reported good success with trotline fishing techniques, which he used to catch a large sample of black drum for tagging and scientific study.

Some states, such as Texas (as of summer 2017), allow spearfishing for black drum, which often frequent jetties and other near-shore structures.

== As food ==
Black drum are edible, with a moderate flavor and are not oily. Some restaurants in the Southern US serve smaller black drum. Big drum can be challenging to clean; removing the large scales is a challenge. Many fishermen prefer to fillet with an electric knife, first removing the fillet from along the backbone, and then using the electric knife to cut the fillet from the skin and scales. Fish over 15 pounds (6.8 kg) can become tough and have a consistency comparable with chicken, rather than the flaky texture of many species of fish. Younger fish are often indistinguishable in flavor from red drum.
