= Gavia egeriana =

Gavia egeriana Temporal range: Burdigalian

Scientific classification
- Kingdom: Animalia
- Phylum: Chordata
- Class: Aves
- Order: Gaviiformes
- Family: Gaviidae
- Genus: Gavia
- Species: †G. egeriana

Binomial name
- †Gavia egeriana P. Švec, 1982

Extinct species of loon

Gavia egeriana is an extinct species of loon from the Miocene epoch, where the holotype was found in Dolnice, Czech Republic dating to the Burdigalian. The holotype consists of two distal ends of the humeri bones. Other more complete material has been found in the Calvert Formation from the Chesapeake Group in the United States, with possible material from the Pungo River Formation from North Carolina. This material consists of the right coracoid and nearly two-thirds of a right ulna and dates to the Langhian. G. egeriana was a very small species of loon and it was the earliest, possibly the ancestral species that gave raise to the other species in the genus.
