= Aurora Fossil Museum =

- Location within North Carolina
- Established: May 1978
- Location: Aurora, North Carolina
- Coordinates: 35.305447°N 76.788543°W
- Type: Natural history museum
- Key holdings: Miocene and Pliocene era fossils
- Website: www.aurorafossilmuseum.org

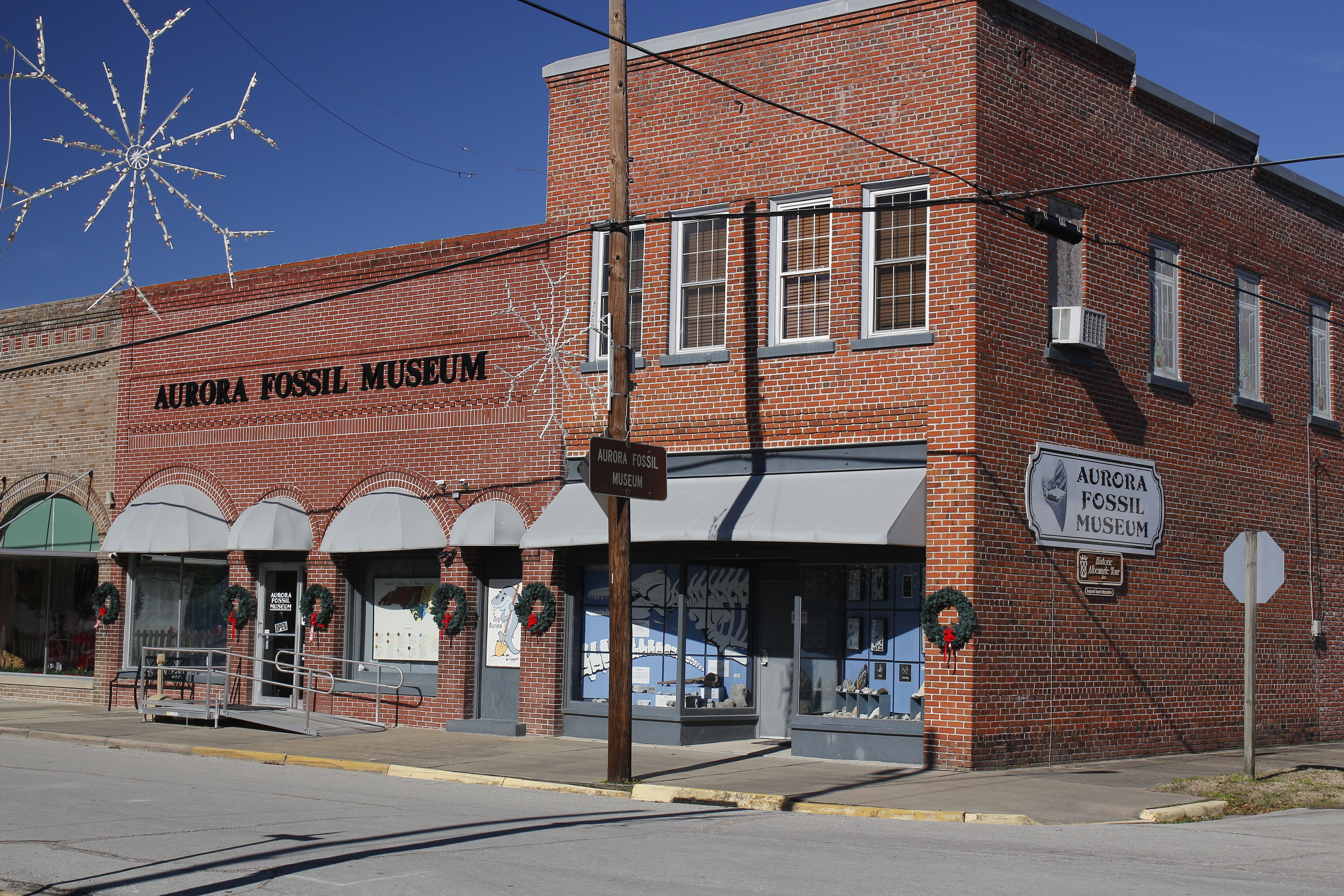

The Aurora Fossil Museum is a natural science museum in Aurora, North Carolina. The museum's collection is built around fossils recovered from the nearby phosphate mine, but also includes fossil specimens donated from around the world as well as geology and meteorite displays. Fossils from the local mine are approximately 22 to 2.5 million years old, coming from layers in the mine traced to the early Miocene and Pliocene eras in the Pungo River and Yorktown formations. The museum also maintains 2 fossil pits in its Fossil Park, located across the street. The pits are filled with mine tailings, where small shells, coral, shark teeth, and other fossils are relatively easy to find. The pits are open during daylight hours daily.

The museum provides information about the geological history of the Aurora area, which is known as a center for fossil hunting (especially due to the phosphate mine). The museum was founded in 1976 and opened in 1978 as a collaboration between the town of Aurora, local mines, East Carolina University, and other interested parties. Visitors are allowed to collect fossils from the neighboring fossil pits.

== Events ==
The museum has hosted a yearly Fossil Festival each May since 1993. The festival includes a fossil auction.
