= Aurora, North Carolina =

- Town
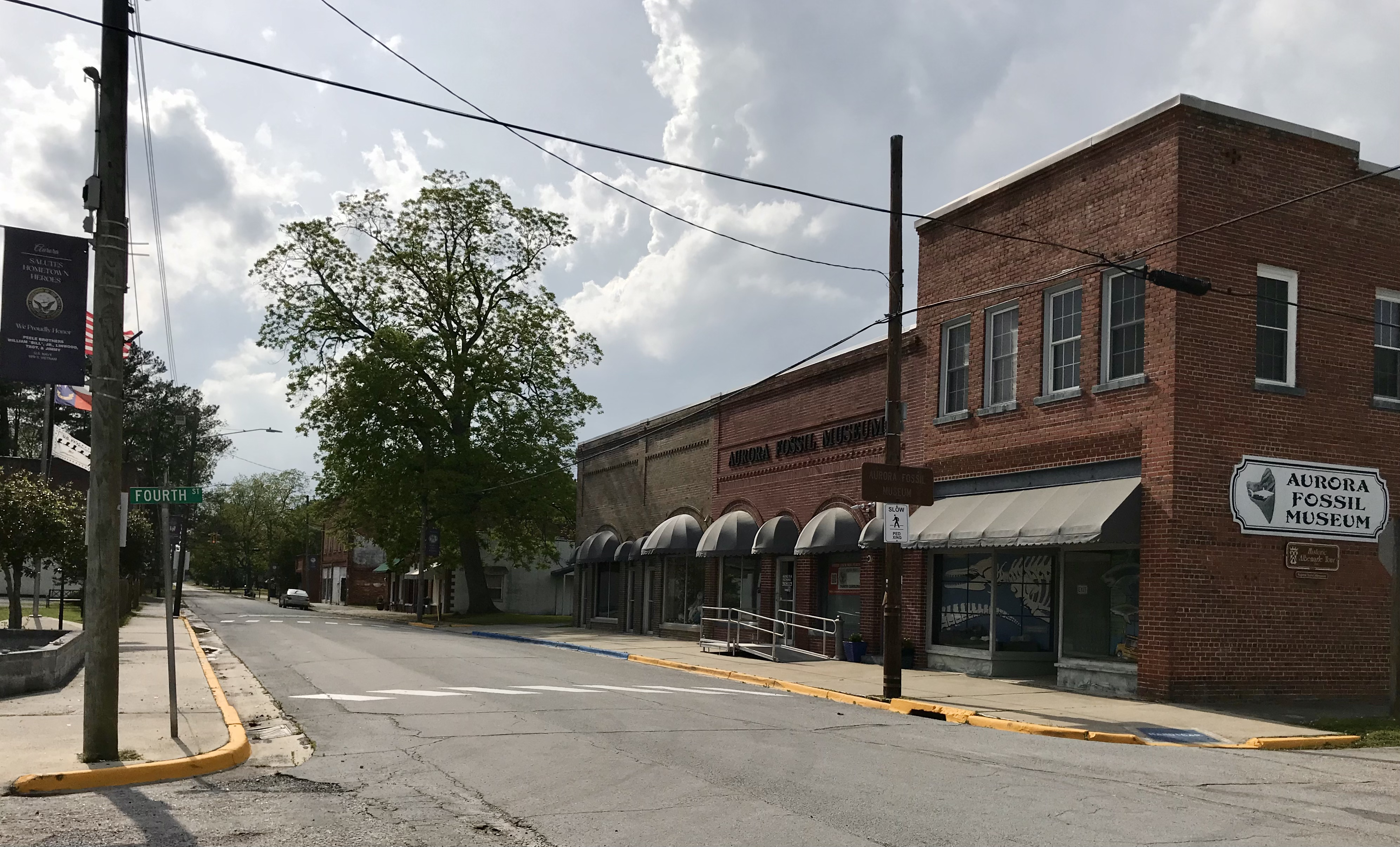
- Main Street

- Seal

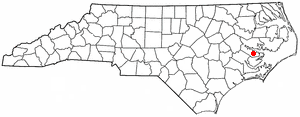
- Location of Aurora, North Carolina
- Coordinates: 35°18′11″N 76°47′20″W
- Country: United States
- State: North Carolina
- County: Beaufort

Government
  - Mayor: Curt Hendrix

Area
  - Total: 1.03 sq mi (2.66 km^{2})
  - Land: 0.93 sq mi (2.40 km^{2})
  - Water: 0.10 sq mi (0.26 km^{2})
- Elevation: 10 ft (3.0 m)

Population (2020)
  - Total: 455
  - Density: 490.2/sq mi (189.27/km^{2})
- Time zone: UTC-5 (Eastern (EST))
  - Summer (DST): UTC-4 (EDT)
- ZIP code: 27806
- Area code: 252
- FIPS code: 37-02620
- GNIS feature ID: 2405186
- Website: auroranc.us

Aurora is a town in Beaufort County, North Carolina, United States. The population was 455 at the 2020 census.

== Geography ==
According to the United States Census Bureau, the town has a total area of 1.0 square mile (2.7 km^{2}), of which 0.93 square miles (2.4 km^{2}) is land and 0.12 square miles (0.3 km^{2}), or 9.60%, is water.

The large Aurora phosphate mine is located just outside the town.

== Climate ==
Climate data for AURORA 6 N, NC, 1991-2020 normals
| Month | Jan | Feb | Mar | Apr | May | Jun | Jul | Aug | Sep | Oct | Nov | Dec | Year |
|---|---|---|---|---|---|---|---|---|---|---|---|---|---|
| Mean daily maximum °F (°C) | 53.4 (11.9) | 55.6 (13.1) | 62.2 (16.8) | 71.8 (22.1) | 78.5 (25.8) | 85.6 (29.8) | 88.9 (31.6) | 87.0 (30.6) | 81.9 (27.7) | 73.4 (23.0) | 63.8 (17.7) | 56.3 (13.5) | 71.5 (21.9) |
| Daily mean °F (°C) | 44.8 (7.1) | 47.0 (8.3) | 53.2 (11.8) | 62.2 (16.8) | 70.2 (21.2) | 77.7 (25.4) | 81.3 (27.4) | 79.8 (26.6) | 74.9 (23.8) | 65.2 (18.4) | 55.6 (13.1) | 48.0 (8.9) | 63.3 (17.4) |
| Mean daily minimum °F (°C) | 36.2 (2.3) | 38.3 (3.5) | 44.2 (6.8) | 52.7 (11.5) | 61.9 (16.6) | 69.9 (21.1) | 73.8 (23.2) | 72.7 (22.6) | 68.0 (20.0) | 57.0 (13.9) | 47.5 (8.6) | 39.8 (4.3) | 55.2 (12.9) |
| Average precipitation inches (mm) | 3.90 (99) | 3.41 (87) | 3.75 (95) | 3.54 (90) | 3.97 (101) | 5.12 (130) | 5.24 (133) | 5.92 (150) | 5.90 (150) | 4.01 (102) | 3.12 (79) | 3.68 (93) | 51.56 (1,310) |
| Average snowfall inches (cm) | 0.1 (0.25) | 0.1 (0.25) | 0.0 (0.0) | 0.0 (0.0) | 0.0 (0.0) | 0.0 (0.0) | 0.0 (0.0) | 0.0 (0.0) | 0.0 (0.0) | 0.0 (0.0) | 0.0 (0.0) | 0.0 (0.0) | 0.2 (0.51) |
| Average precipitation days (≥ 0.01 in) | 10.6 | 9.6 | 10.0 | 8.4 | 9.4 | 9.7 | 12.1 | 10.4 | 9.0 | 7.8 | 8.2 | 10.0 | 115.2 |
Source: NOAA

== Demographics ==
Historical population
| Census | Pop. | Note | %± |
|---|---|---|---|
| 1880 | 81 | | — |
| 1890 | 251 | | 209.9% |
| 1900 | 314 | | 25.1% |
| 1910 | 440 | | 40.1% |
| 1920 | 524 | | 19.1% |
| 1930 | 429 | | −18.1% |
| 1940 | 492 | | 14.7% |
| 1950 | 525 | | 6.7% |
| 1960 | 449 | | −14.5% |
| 1970 | 620 | | 38.1% |
| 1980 | 698 | | 12.6% |
| 1990 | 654 | | −6.3% |
| 2000 | 583 | | −10.9% |
| 2010 | 520 | | −10.8% |
| 2020 | 455 | | −12.5% |
U.S. Decennial Census

As of the census of 2000, there were 583 people, 265 households, and 169 families residing in the town. The population density was 615.8 inhabitants per square mile (237.8/km^{2}). There were 316 housing units at an average density of 333.8 per square mile (128.9/km^{2}). The racial makeup of the town was 51.29% White, 47.51% African American, 0.34% from other races, and 0.86% from two or more races. Hispanic or Latino of any race were 1.37% of the population.

There were 265 households, out of which 23.4% had children under the age of 18 living with them, 43.8% were married couples living together, 15.8% had a female householder with no husband present, and 36.2% were non-families. 33.6% of all households were made up of individuals, and 18.9% had someone living alone who was 65 years of age or older. The average household size was 2.20 and the average family size was 2.81.

In the town, the population was spread out, with 22.8% under the age of 18, 6.7% from 18 to 24, 23.0% from 25 to 44, 25.0% from 45 to 64, and 22.5% who were 65 years of age or older. The median age was 43 years. For every 100 females, there were 92.4 males. For every 100 females age 18 and over, there were 83.7 males.

The median income for a household in the town was $25,917, and the median income for a family was $42,000. Males had a median income of $33,542 versus $20,000 for females. The per capita income for the town was $13,252. About 15.5% of families and 20.9% of the population were below the poverty line, including 24.5% of those under age 18 and 16.9% of those age 65 or over.

== Media ==
- The Pamlico News, newspaper for the Pamlico Sound area
- 104.5 FM WSTK Surge Radio – Rhythmic Hot AC/Dance Hits

== Museum ==
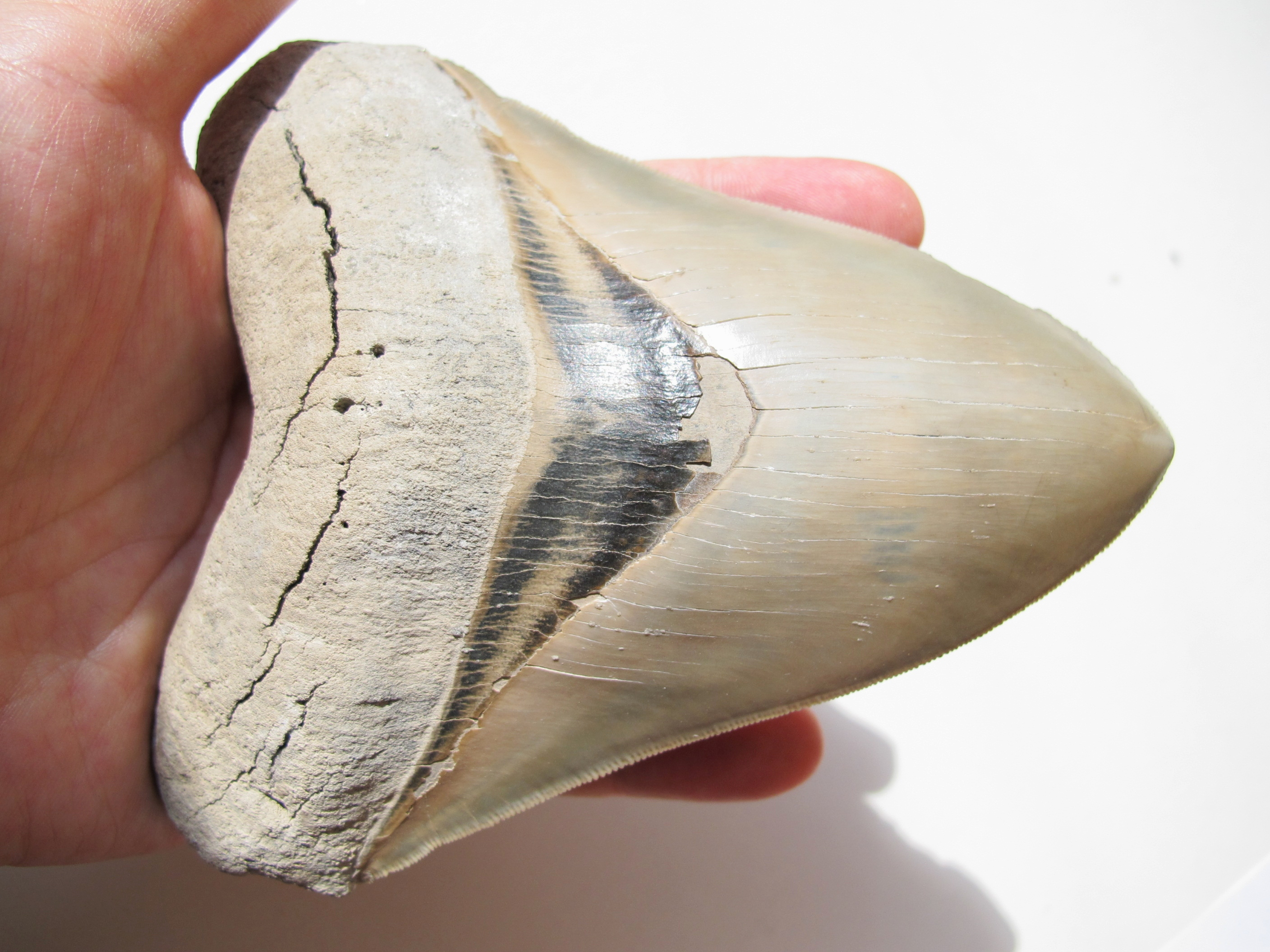
A C. megalodon tooth excavated from Aurora.

Aurora is the home of the Aurora Fossil Museum, which houses specimens collected from the local PCS Phosphate Mine. The museum's collection includes a wide variety of marine fossils from the Pleistocene, Pliocene and Miocene epochs. It also houses other specimens and a gem and mineral display. This display includes a black room to see fossils and minerals glow under a black light. There is also a full room of Native American artifacts as well as the newest addition, the Mine Room.

== Education ==
Beaufort County Schools is the local school district. The local schools are S. W. Snowden School (K-8), and Southside High School.

BHM Regional Library operates the Hazel W. Guilford Memorial Library in Aurora.

== Notable people ==
- Richard Coffey, former NBA player
