= Aurora mine =

Phosphate mine and plant in North Carolina, US

- Location in North Carolina
- Location: Richland Township, near Aurora, North Carolina, United States; 35°19′23″N 76°48′29″W
- Products: Phosphates
- Company: Nutrien

The Aurora mine is the largest integrated phosphate mining and chemical plant in the world. The mine is located in Richland Township, in Aurora in Beaufort County, North Carolina. The mine, has been owned by PotashCorp since 1995, has an annual production capacity of over six million tonnes of phosphate ore. In 2008 the mine produced 6.6 million tonnes of phosphate ore from which 1.3 million tonnes of phosphoric acid was produced.

== History ==
The phosphates of the Aurora mine are the result of a recession experienced by the sea coast of Aurora. Phosphates were deposited into the sea about 15 million years ago, deposits which are now known as the Pungo River Formation. The result was a phosphate ore zone with 98.4 feet (30.0 m) of low-grade phosphate sand blanketed by other sediments. The ore zone is estimated to be about 39.4 feet (12.0 m) thick, consisting of phosphate sand, fine quartz, clay, and silt. PotashCorp bought the Aurora mine in 1995 from the Texas Gulf Sulphur Company as its first phosphate operation, and purchased the agricultural chemicals division of Occidental Chemicals six months later. In 2018, PotashCorp merged with Agrium, another Canadian company, to form Nutrien Ltd, current owner of the mine.

As of 2005 the Aurora mine had estimated proven and probable reserves of approximately 356 million tonnes of phosphate rock at an average grade of 30.7% P_{2}O_{5}. PotashCorp has rights to exploit an area of 8,900 hectares (22,000 acres) of phosphate-bearing reserves, sufficient to support the mine's operations for around 75 years. In 2009 the mine produced 4.2 million tonnes of phosphate rock and 0.93 million tonnes of phosphoric acid and had a number of 1,093 employees. In June 2009, PotashCorp received permission from the US Army Corps of Engineers to mine reserves within the extraterritorial jurisdiction boundaries for a period of 30 years.

The phosphate rock is transported by waterway to the deep water port of Morehead City, and a 31 miles (50 km) railroad links the mining complex to the Norfolk Southern Railway and CSX Transportation rail networks.

== See also ==
Phosphate mining in the United States
