= Pogonias courbina =

Conservation status
- Vulnerable (IUCN 3.1)

Scientific classification
- Kingdom: Animalia
- Phylum: Chordata
- Class: Actinopterygii
- Order: Acanthuriformes
- Family: Sciaenidae
- Genus: Pogonias
- Species: P. courbina

Binomial name
- Pogonias courbina (Lacépède, 1803)

Synonyms
- Pogonathus courbina Lacepède, 1803; Sciena barbata Larrañaga, 1923

Species of ray-finned fish

Pogonias courbina, the southern black drum, is a species of marine ray-finned fish belonging to the family Sciaenidae, the drums and croakers. This species is found in the western South Atlantic Ocean from southern Brazil to northern Argentina.
