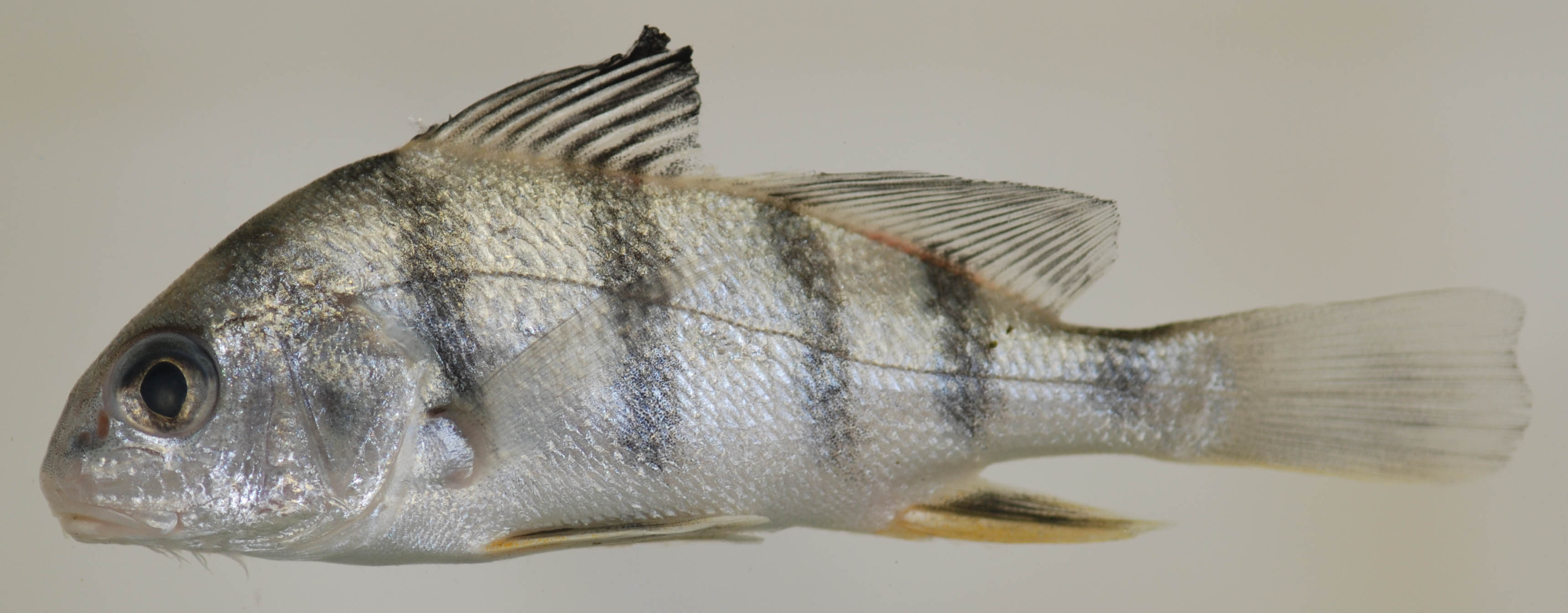
- Pogonias cromis

Scientific classification
- Kingdom: Animalia
- Phylum: Chordata
- Class: Actinopterygii
- Division: Teleostei
- Order: Acanthuriformes
- Family: Sciaenidae
- Genus: Pogonias; Lacépède, 1801

Type species
- Pogonias fasciatus Lacépède, 1801

Species
- 2, see text

= Pogonias =

Genus of ray-finned fishes

Pogonias is a genus of ray-finned fish in the family Sciaenidae. It was formerly believed to be a monotypic genus only containing the black drum, but a second species was re-described in 2019.

== Taxonomy ==
Pogonias was first proposed as a monospecific genus in 1803 by the French naturalist Bernard Germain de Lacépède when he described Pogonias fasciatus as a new species from Charleston, South Carolina. Pogonias fasciatus subsequently came to be regarded as a junior synonym of Linnaeus' Labrus chromis. The genus Pogonias has been placed in the subfamily Sciaeninae by some workers, but the 5th edition of Fishes of the World does not recognise subfamilies within the Sciaenidae which it places in the order Acanthuriformes.

== Etymology ==
Pogonias means "bearded" and is an allusion to the may barbels on the chin of the type species.

== Species ==
There are currently two described species:

- Pogonias courbina (Lacépède, 1803) (Southern black drum)
- Pogonias cromis (Linnaeus, 1766) (Black drum)

== Characteristics ==
Pogonias drums are characterised by having rhomboidal, compressed bodies, with a low head and an almost horizontal mouth located beneath the snout. There are 5 pores on the chin with 3 pairs of small barbels and a further 8 to 22 barbels along the outer edge of the lower jaw. The preoperculum has no serrations. The dorsal fin has a deep incision dividing the spiny part at the front from the soft-rayed part. There are 11 thin spines and between 19 and 22 soft rays in the dorsal fin while the small anal fin has 2 spines and between 5 and 7 soft rays. The short pectoral fin does not extend as far as the anus, These are large fishes with the maximum published total length of the black drum being 170 cm (67 in) and its maximum published weight being 51.3 kg (113 lb).

== Distribution and habitat ==
Pogonias drums are found in the western Atlantic and the two species are parapatric. The black drum is found as far north as the Bay of Fundy, although they are uncommon farther north than Chesapeake Bay and south to the Gulf of Mexico and the Bahamas, although absent from Cuba. The Southern black drum is found in southeastern South America between Rio de Janeiro State and the southern San Matías Gulf in Patagonia. They are demersal coastal fishes which live on sandy or muudy bottoms and use estuaries as nursery areas.
