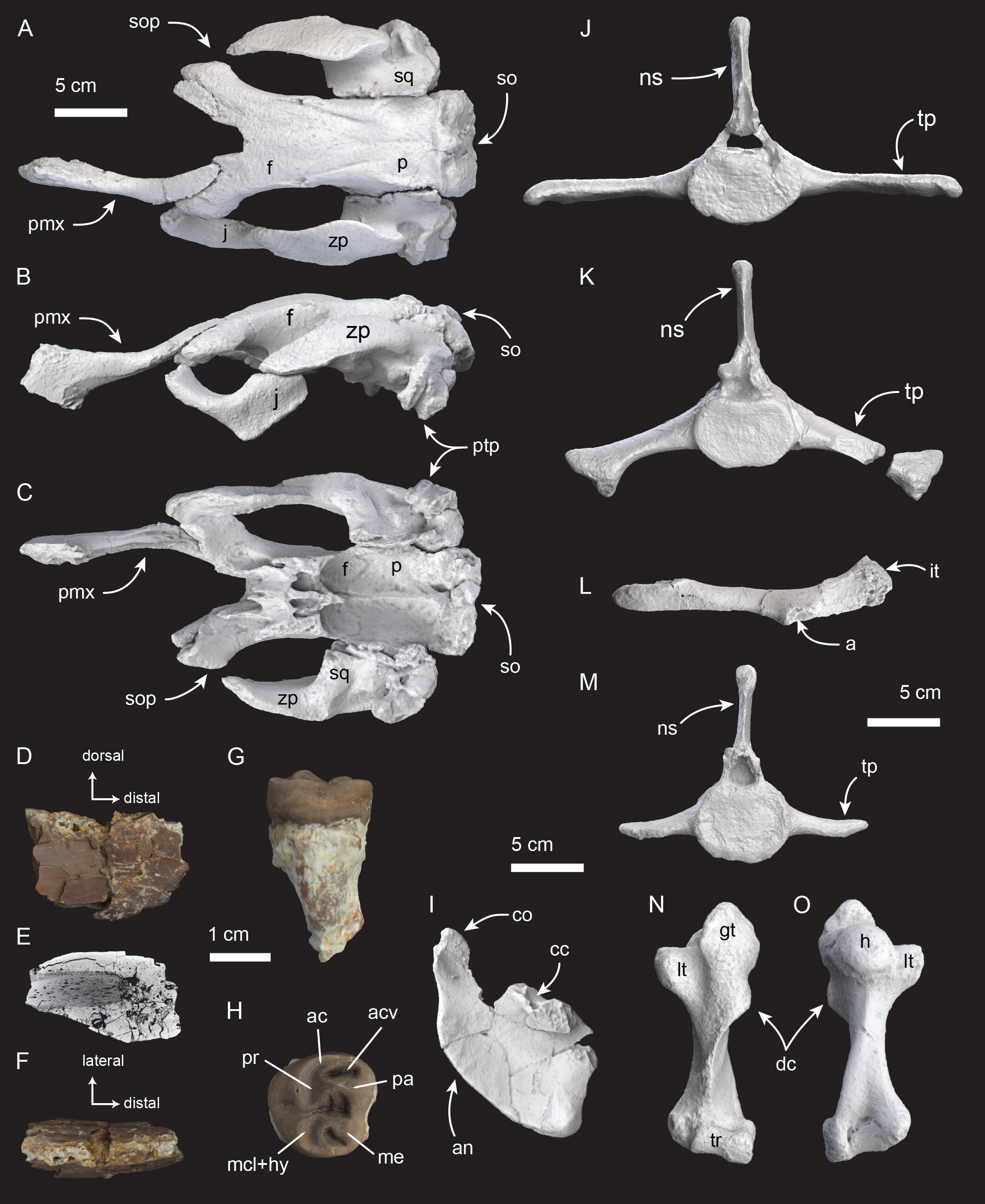
- Holotype of Salwasiren

Scientific classification
- Kingdom: Animalia
- Phylum: Chordata
- Class: Mammalia
- Order: Sirenia
- Family: Dugongidae
- Subfamily: Dugonginae
- Genus: †Salwasiren; Pyenson et al., 2025
- Species: †S. qatarensis

Binomial name
- †Salwasiren qatarensis Pyenson et al., 2025

= Salwasiren =

Salwasiren Temporal range: Early Miocene (Aquitanian), 23.03–21.6 Ma

Extinct genus of sirenian

Salwasiren is an extinct genus of dugongid sirenian mammal from the Early Miocene of the Dam Formation (Lower Al-Kharrara Member) of southwestern Qatar. The genus contains a single species, Salwasiren qatarensis. The generic name, Salwasiren, is a reference to the Gulf of Salwah, while the specific name, qatarensis refers to Qatar, the country in which it was found.

== Discovery and naming ==
The fossils of Salwasiren were discovered in 2023–2024 when Nicholas Pyenson and colleagues were prospecting fossil-bearing outcrops of the Dam Formation in southwestern Qatar. In 2025, Pyenson et al. named Salwasiren qatarensis as a new genus and species based on the discovered material.

The holotype of S. qatarensis consists of fossilised remains of an incomplete cranium, a mandible, a maxillary second molar, a sternum, two scapulae, two humeri, an ilium, and a partial vertebral column. An incomplete left incisor was also referred to this species.

== Classification ==
The cladogram below illustrates the results of the phylogenetic analysis done by Pyenson et al. (2025).

- Sirenia
  - Trichechidae (manatees and their fossil relatives)
  - - †Kaupitherium spp.
    - - †Lentiarenium cristolii
      - - †Priscosiren atlantica
        - †Caribosiren turneri
        - †Stegosiren macei
        - Dugongidae
          - †Dusisiren spp. + †Metaxytherium spp. + †Hydrodamalis spp.
          - Dugonginae
            - †Crenatosiren olseni
            - - - †Italosiren bellunensis
                - - †Salwasiren qatarensis
                  - - †Nanosiren spp.
                    - - Dugong dugon
                      - †Corystosiren varguezi
              - - †Callistosiren boriquensis
                - - †Rytiodus heali
                  - - - †Domningia sodhae
                      - - †Dioplotherium manigaulti
                        - - †Xenosiren yucateca
                          - †Norosiren zazavavindrano
                    - - †Kutchisiren cylindrica
                      - - †Rytiodus capgrandi
                        - - †Bharatisiren spp.
                          - - †Culebratherium alemani
                            - †Dioplotherium allisoni

== Palaeoenvironment ==
Salwasiren likely lived alongside multiple indeterminate odontocete cetaceans, turtles, teleosts and carcharhiniform sharks.
