= Carrillo Puerto Formation =

Geologic formation in Mexico

- Stratigraphic range: Late Miocene-Early Pliocene; ~10.3–3.6 Ma
- Type: Formation

Lithology
- Primary: Limestone

Location
- Region: Yucatán
- Country: Mexico

The Carrillo Puerto Formation is a geologic formation in Mexico. It preserves fossils dating back to the Late Miocene to Early Pliocene of the Neogene period.

== Fossil content ==
Various fossils have been found in the formation:

=== Fishes ===
- Carcharodon hastalis
- Chilomycterus dzonotensis
- Galeocerdo sp.
- Hemipristis serra
- Megalodon

=== Mammals ===
- Corystosiren varguezi
- Dioplotherium sp.
- Nanosiren cf. garciae
- Xenosiren yucateca

== See also ==
- List of fossiliferous stratigraphic units in Mexico
