= Indosiren =

Indosiren Temporal range: Miocene

Scientific classification
- Kingdom: Animalia
- Phylum: Chordata
- Class: Mammalia
- Order: Sirenia
- Family: Dugongidae
- Genus: †Indosiren von Koenigswald, 1952

Type species
- Indosiren javanensis von Koenigswald, 1952

Sirenian from Western Indonesia (Java)

Indosiren is a genus of sirenian that lived in the Western part of Java during Miocene epoch. It was described as Indosiren javanense and then amended into I. javanensis. Not much is known regarding the animal overall shape and lifestyle: it is only known from a tooth fragment that was inferred to be a molar (M2/M3). The tooth is a small (14,6 mm x 13,5 mm x 10,6 mm) biphodont upper molar that lack development roots. It is said that the occlusal surface is similar to the tooth of Trichechus (the extant manatees) and Prototherium, while the lateral view also bears resemblance to manatee. The original describer (Koeningswald, 1952) also mentioned that the tooth differs from other genera of similar age such as Miosiren and Metaxytherium (then recognized as Halianassa and Felsinotherium).

Koeningswald also mentioned a discovery of heavy bones and tusks from marine sediment that he claimed as those of sirenian. There are also upper Eocene pachyostotic rib that Koeningswald said as the oldest indication of sirenian presence in East Indies. Unfortunately, these Javan specimen are now lost or too fragmentary to be determinate; these specimens cannot be confirmed to be Indosiren. There are additional specimens from India described as Indosiren: I. koeningswaldi. While it is also a dugongine, Bajpai & Domning (1997) proposed that it may be closer to Bharatisiren instead.
