= Dam Formation =

Geological formation in the Arabian Peninsula

- Stratigraphic range: Early Miocene; ~22–18 Ma
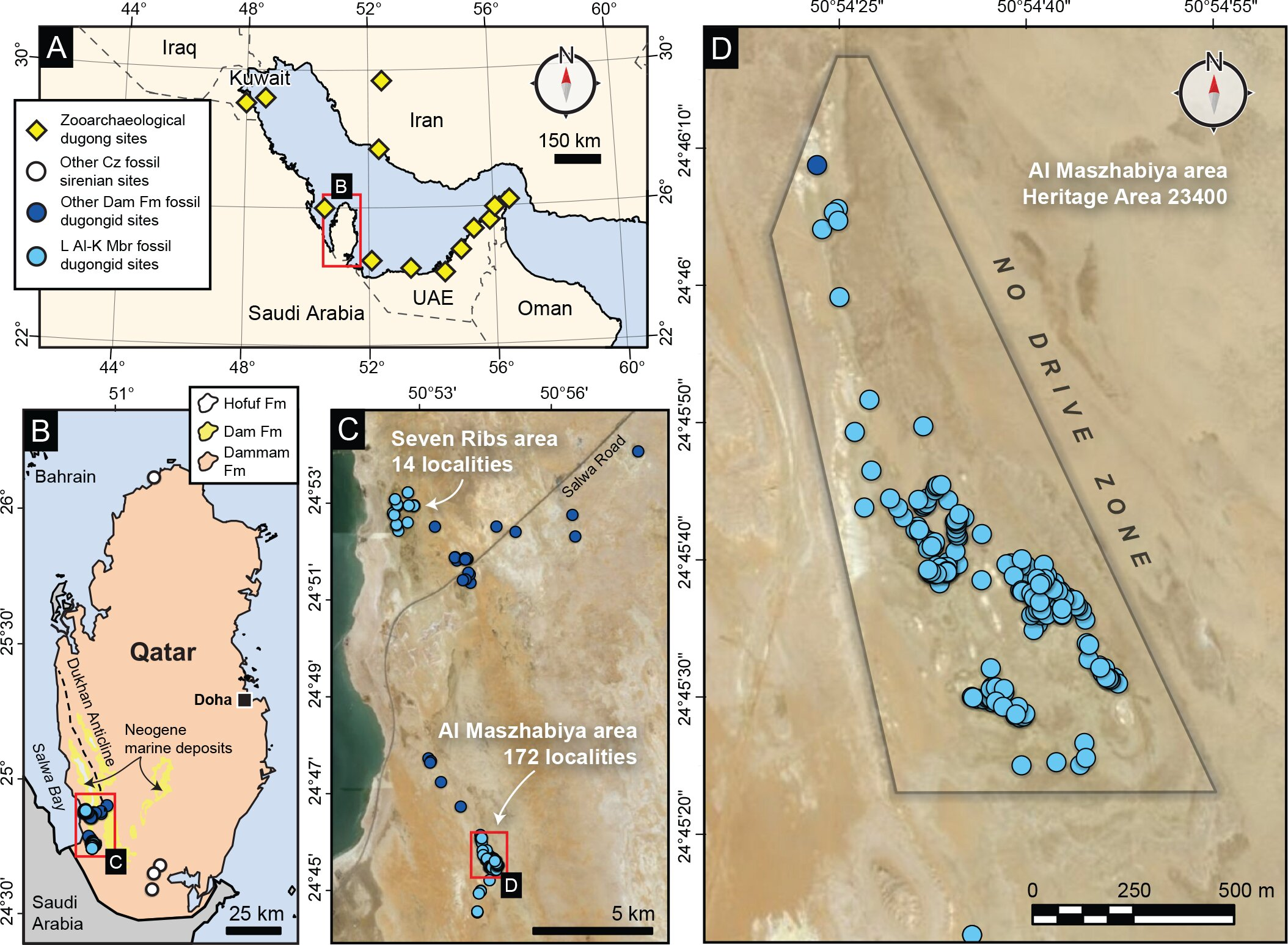
- The location of the Dam formation in Qatar (dark and light blue dots)
- Type: Geological formation
- Sub-units: Al-Kharrara Member, Al-Nakhsh member, Abu Samrah member
- Underlies: Dammam Formation
- Overlies: Hofuf Formation

Lithology
- Primary: Silicate, dolomite and calcite
- Other: Celestine, chlorite, gypsum, kaolinite, muscovite, illite, palygorskite, and smectite

Location
- Country: Qatar, Saudi Arabia, UAE

Type section
- Named by: Steineke and Kock (unpublished), Powers (in Saudi Arabia), Cavelier (in Qatar)
- Year defined: 1935 (unpublished), 1968 (Saudi Arabia), 1970 (Qatar)
- Coordinates: 26°21′42″N 49°27′42″E
- Country: Qatar, Saudi Arabia, United Arab Emirates
- Dam Formation (Saudi Arabia)

The Dam Formation is an Early Miocene formation located in southwestern Qatar, Saudi Arabia and the UAE.

== Description ==
The formation was first described in a report in 1935 by Steineke and Kock. However, this report was unpublished. It was first described in published material by Powers in 1968 in Saudi Arabia, and by Cavelier in 1970 in Qatar.

The formation in Saudi Arabia and the U.A.E. was deposited in a terrestrial environment, while the formation in Qatar was deposited in a marine habitat as evidenced by the multiple marine animals found in the formation.

== Fossil content ==
Mammals from the Dam formation
Genus	Species	Material	Notes	Member	Images
Salwasiren	S. qataernsis	ARC.2023.23.008, one associated skeleton including an incomplete cranium, mandible, left upper molar (M2), sternum, both scapulae and humeri, a partial vertebral column and ilium. ARC.2023.28.014, an incomplete left incisor	A dugongid sireanian	Lower Al-Kharrara Member	
Odontoceti	Indeterminate	A tooth among other remains		Lower Al-Kharrara Member	

Fish from the Dam formation
Genus	Species	Material	Notes	Member	Images
Teleost	Indeterminate			Lower Al-Kharrara Member	
Carcharhiniformes	Indeterminate			Lower Al-Kharrara Member	
Physodon/Scoliodon	P./S.sp.				
Aetobatus	A.arcuatus		A species of Eagle ray		
Diodon	D.sp.		A species of porcupine fish		

Reptiles from the Dam formation
Genus	Species	Material	Notes	Member	Images
Testudines	Indeterminate			Lower Al-Kharrara Member	
Reptillia?	Indeterminate			Lower/Middle Al-Kharrara Member	

Molluscs from the Dam formation
Genus	Species	Material	Notes	Member	Images
Ostrea	O.latimarginata		Bivalve	Lower & Middle Al-Kharrara Members	
Pectinidae	Indeterminate		Scallop		
Anomia	Indeterminate		Bivalve		
Spondylus					
Avicula					
Clementia	C.papayracea		"Impressions and molds"	Lower, Middle & Upper Al-Kharrara Members & Abu Samrah member	
Chama	C. gryphoides		"Impressions and molds"		
Clausinella	C.erisca		Bivalve		
Clausinella	C. persica		Bivalve		
Hydrobiidae	Indeterminate		A family of fresh to brackish water snails		
Chlamys	C.senatoria		Bivalve	Upper Al-Kharrara Member & Abu Samrah member	
Fissurella	Indeterminate		Gastropod	Upper Al-Kharrara Member & Abu Samrah member	
Natica	Indeterminate		Gastropod	Upper Al-Kharrara Member & Abu Samrah member	
Xenophora	Indeterminate		Gastropod	Upper Al-Kharrara Member & Abu Samrah member	
Turritella	Indeterminate		Gastropod	Upper Al-Kharrara Member & Abu Samrah member	
Cerithiidae	Indeterminate		Gastropod	Upper Al-Kharrara Member & Abu Samrah member	
Conus	Indeterminate		Gastropod	Upper Al-Kharrara Member & Abu Samrah member	
Bulla	Indeterminate		Gastropod	Upper Al-Kharrara Member & Abu Samrah member	
Hydrobia	Indeterminate		Gastropod "Very locally" found	Upper Al-Kharrara Member & Abu Samrah member	
Potamides	Indeterminate		Gastropod "Very locally" found	Upper Al-Kharrara Member & Abu Samrah member	
Capsa	C. lacunosa			Upper Al-Kharrara Member & Abu Samrah member	
Capsa	cf. C. fragilis			Upper Al-Kharrara Member & Abu Samrah member	
Tellina	T. bipartita		Bivalve	Upper Al-Kharrara Member & Abu Samrah member	
Diplodonta	D.cf. rotundata			Upper Al-Kharrara Member & Abu Samrah member	
Barbatia	B. barbata		Bivalve	Upper Al-Kharrara Member & Abu Samrah member	
Anadara	A.cf. turonica			Upper Al-Kharrara Member & Abu Samrah member	
Cardiocardita	C.cf. monolifera			Upper Al-Kharrara Member & Abu Samrah member	
Cardiocardita	C.aff. turonica			Upper Al-Kharrara Member & Abu Samrah member	
Solecurtus	S. basteroti			Upper Al-Kharrara Member & Abu Samrah member	
Timoclea	T. subspadicea			Upper Al-Kharrara Member & Abu Samrah member	
Musculus	M.sp.		Bivalve	Upper Al-Kharrara Member & Abu Samrah member	
Eastonia	Indeterminate			Upper Al-Kharrara Member & Abu Samrah member	
Panopea	Indeterminate		Gastropod	Upper Al-Kharrara Member & Abu Samrah member	
Tapes	Indeterminate		Bivalve	Upper Al-Kharrara Member & Abu Samrah member	
Mactra	Indeterminate			Upper Al-Kharrara Member & Abu Samrah member	
Lucina	Indeterminate			Upper Al-Kharrara Member & Abu Samrah member	
Cardium	Indeterminate			Upper Al-Kharrara Member & Abu Samrah member	
?Olivella	Indeterminate		Remains of "Internal molds"	Upper Al-Kharrara Member & Abu Samrah member	
Voluta	Indeterminate		Remains of "Internal molds"	Upper Al-Kharrara Member & Abu Samrah member	
Fasciolaria	Indeterminate		Remains of "Internal molds"	Upper Al-Kharrara Member & Abu Samrah member	
Cassis	Indeterminate		Remains of "Internal molds"	Upper Al-Kharrara Member & Abu Samrah member	
Cypraea	Indeterminate		Remains of "Internal molds"	Upper Al-Kharrara Member & Abu Samrah member	

Echinoderms from the Dam formation
Genus	Species	Material	Notes	Member	Images
Fibularia	F. damensis		A Sand Dollar		
Agassizia	A. aff. persica		Sea urchin		
Cidaris	C.sp.	Spines	Sea urchin		

Bryozoans from the Dam formation
Genus	Species	Material	Notes	Member	Images
?Cupuladria	C. gr. haidingeri				

Crustacean remains have also been found in the formation
