= Sirenavus =

Sirenavus Temporal range: Lutetian-Priabonian ~48.6–34 Ma

Scientific classification
- Kingdom: Animalia
- Phylum: Chordata
- Class: Mammalia
- Order: Sirenia
- Family: Dugongidae
- Genus: †Sirenavus; Kretzoi, 1941

Species
- S. hungaricus Kretzoi, 1941 (type)

Extinct genus of mammals

Sirenavus was an early sea cow from the Eocene of Hungary (Eger-Kis-Eged, Felsogalla, Felsotarkany and Urom).

== Location ==
Fossils of Sirenavus are known from the Eocene deposits in Hungary.

== See also ==
- Evolution of sirenians
