= Anisosiren =

Anisosiren Temporal range: Lutetian ~47–40 Ma

Scientific classification
- Kingdom: Animalia
- Phylum: Chordata
- Class: Mammalia
- Order: Sirenia
- Family: Dugongidae
- Genus: †Anisosiren; Kordos, 1979

Species
- A. pannonica Kordos, 1979 (type)

Anisosiren was an early sea cow from the Middle Eocene of Hungary.

== Location ==
Fossils of Anisosiren are known from the Eocene deposits in Hungary.

== See also ==
- Evolution of sirenians
