= Norosiren =

Norosiren Temporal range: Miocene

Scientific classification
- Kingdom: Animalia
- Phylum: Chordata
- Class: Mammalia
- Infraclass: Placentalia
- Order: Sirenia
- Family: Dugongidae
- Genus: †Norosiren
- Species: †N. zazavavindrano

Binomial name
- †Norosiren zazavavindrano Samonds et al., 2019

Genus of molluscs (fossil)

Norosiren is an extinct genus of sirenian that inhabited Madagascar during the Miocene epoch. It contains a single species, N. zazavavindrano.
