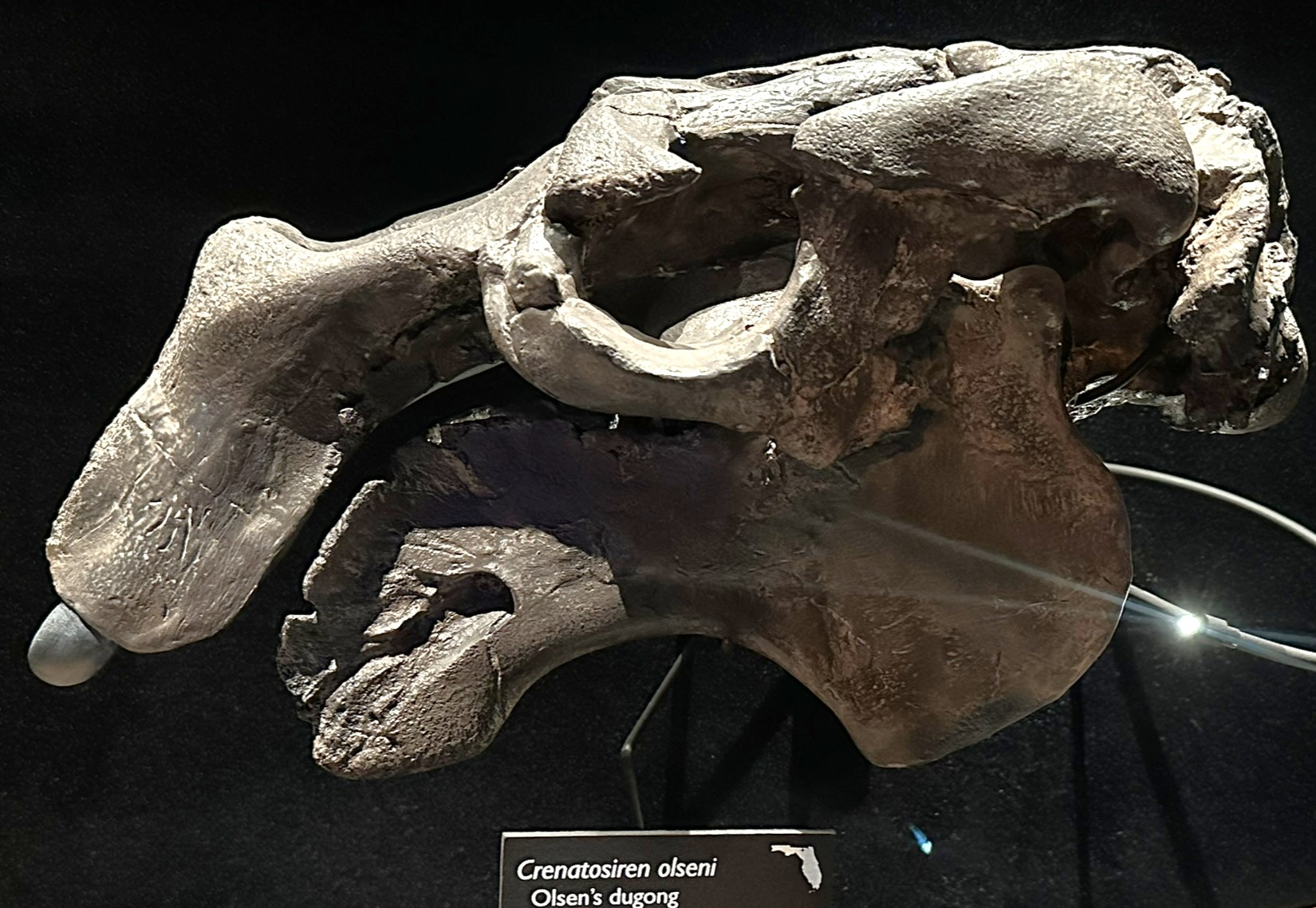
- Skull cast of C. olseni, Florida Museum of Natural History

Scientific classification
- Domain: Eukaryota
- Kingdom: Animalia
- Phylum: Chordata
- Class: Mammalia
- Order: Sirenia
- Family: Dugongidae
- Genus: †Crenatosiren; Domning, 1991
- Species: †C. olseni

Binomial name
- †Crenatosiren olseni (Olsen, 1976)

= Crenatosiren =

Crenatosiren Temporal range: Late Oligocene

Extinct genus of dugongid sirenian

Crenatosiren is an extinct genus of dugongid sirenian known from the late Oligocene (Chattian) of Florida, North Carolina, and South Carolina. The type and only known species is Crenatosiren olseni.

== Taxonomy ==
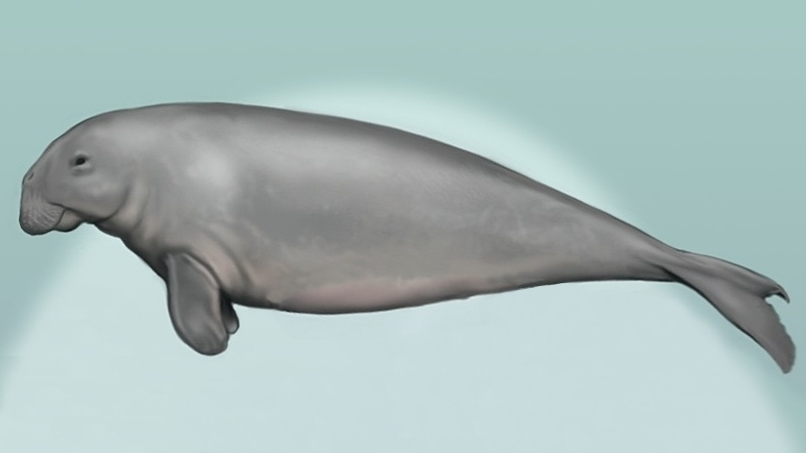
Life restoration of C. olseni

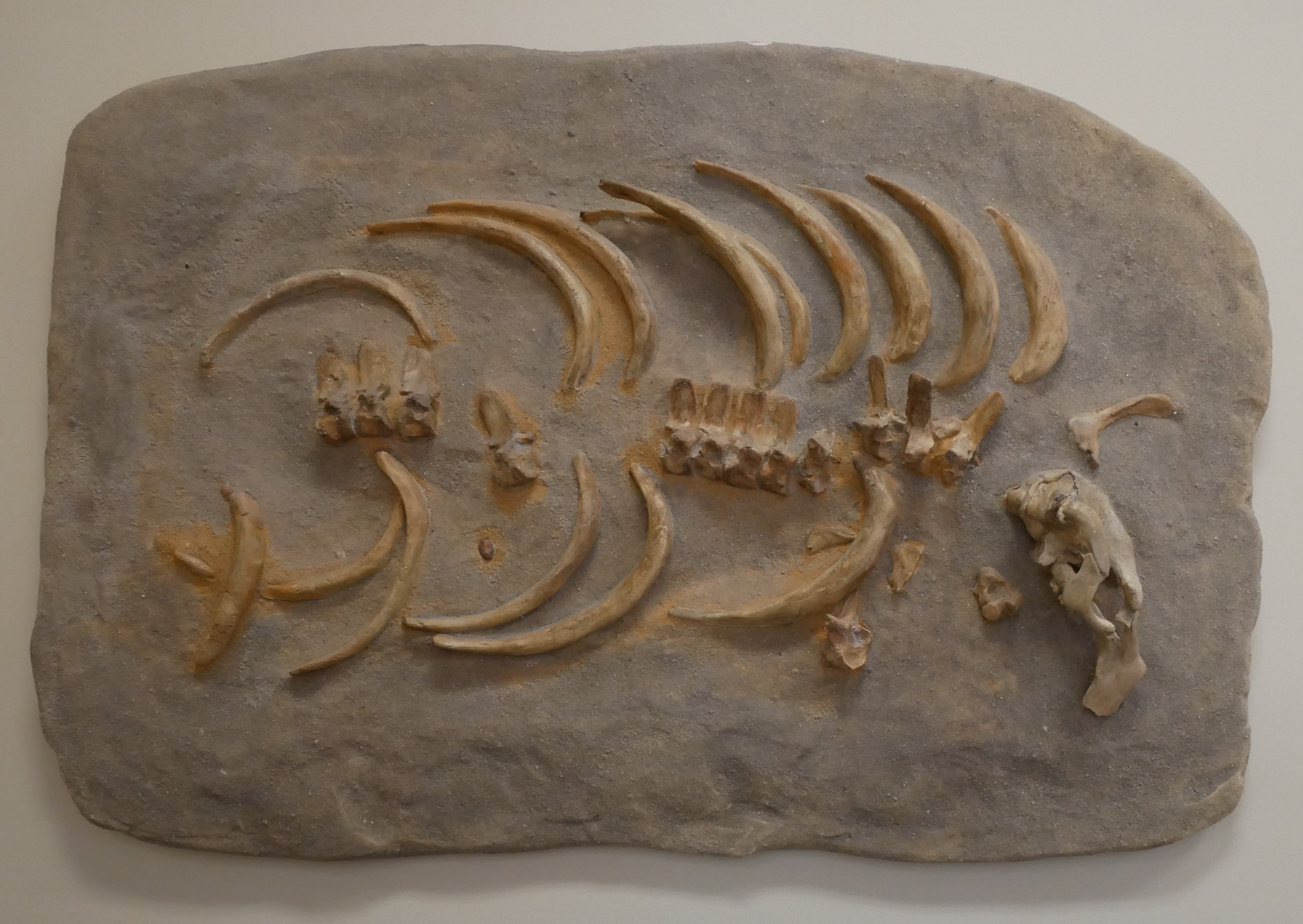
Partial Skeleton, Alabama Museum of Natural History

Crenatosiren was originally named "Halitherium" olseni by Rinehart (1976), who described the species from marine deposits of the late Oligocene (Arikareean NALMA) Parachucla Formation in the Suwannee River in Hamilton County, Florida. Domning (1991) eventually recognized the taxon as more derived than the Halitherium type species and assigned it to the new genus Crenatosiren, classifying it as a relative of the dugongid Rytiodus. The genus name is derived from the Latin words crenatus (meaning 'notched') and siren. More specimens of C. olseni were later found in the Ashley and Chandler Bridge formations of South Carolina.

== Palaeoecology ==
C. olseni primarily ate seagrasses. Dioplotherium manigaulti and Metaxytherium sp. coexisted with C. olseni in its habitat and also fed on seagrasses, suggesting that some sort of niche partitioning existed between the three taxa.
