= Chilomycterus dzonotensis =

Chilomycterus dzonotensis Temporal range: Late Miocene/Early Pliocene

Scientific classification
- Kingdom: Animalia
- Phylum: Chordata
- Class: Actinopterygii
- Division: Teleostei
- Order: Tetraodontiformes
- Family: Diodontidae
- Genus: Chilomycterus
- Species: †C. dzonotensis

Binomial name
- †Chilomycterus dzonotensis Cantalice et al., 2025

Extinct species of fish

Chilomycterus dzonotensis is an extinct species of burrfish that inhabited the waters around the Yucatan Peninsula during the Neogene period. The species name derives from d'zonot, the Mayan word for "sinkhole" (eventually translated into the Spanish and English cenote).

== Distribution ==
Fossils of C. dzonotensis are known from the Carrillo Puerto Formation, dating to the boundary between the Late Miocene and Early Pliocene. As suggested by the species name, these fossils were recovered via cave diving within cenotes (the "X-Nabuy" Cenote), at a depth of about 40 to 50 metres (130 to 160 ft) below the surface.
