= Anomotherium =

Anomotherium Temporal range: Oligocene ~34–23 Ma

Scientific classification
- Kingdom: Animalia
- Phylum: Chordata
- Class: Mammalia
- Order: Sirenia
- Family: Trichechidae
- Subfamily: †Miosireninae
- Genus: †Anomotherium; Siegfried, 1965

Species
- Anomotherium langewieschei Siegfried, 1965 (type)

Anomotherium is an extinct genus of manatee that lived in the shallow seas of what is now Northern Germany. Its closest relative is Miosiren. Fossils of the genus have been found in the Bohlen and Doberg Formations of Germany.

== Ecology ==
Like extant sirenians, Anomotherium was probably capable of feeding upon seagrasses, brown algae, and mollusks on the shallow seabed.

== See also ==
- Evolution of sirenians
