= Paralitherium =

Paralitherium Temporal range: Priabonian ~37–34 Ma

Scientific classification
- Domain: Eukaryota
- Kingdom: Animalia
- Phylum: Chordata
- Class: Mammalia
- Order: Sirenia
- Family: Dugongidae
- Genus: †Paralitherium; Kordos, 1977

Species
- P. tarkanyense Kordos, 1977 (type)

Sea cow found in Hungary

Paralitherium was an early sea cow from the late Eocene of Hungary (Felsotarkany).

== Etymology ==
The species name tarkanyense honors Felsotarkany, Hungary, where the type specimen was collected.

== See also ==
- Evolution of sirenians
