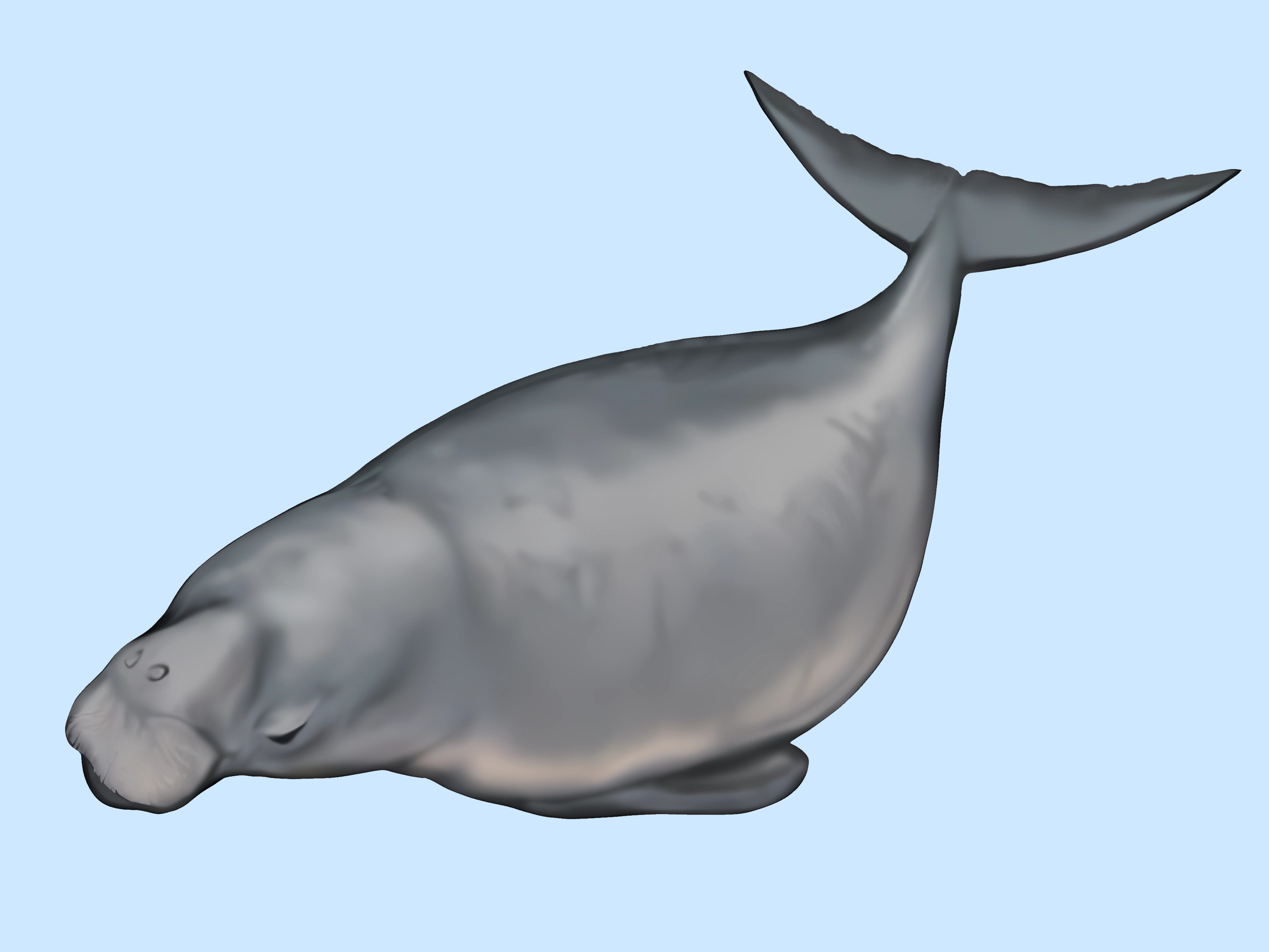

Scientific classification
- Kingdom: Animalia
- Phylum: Chordata
- Class: Mammalia
- Order: Sirenia
- Family: Dugongidae
- Subfamily: Dugonginae
- Genus: †Domningia; Thewissen and Bajpai, 2009

Species
- D. sodhae Thewissen and Bajpai, 2009 (type)

= Domningia =

Domningia Temporal range: Miocene

Extinct genus of mammals

Domningia is an extinct genus of mammal which existed in what is now India during the Miocene period. It is named in honor of Daryl Domning, a sirenian specialist.
