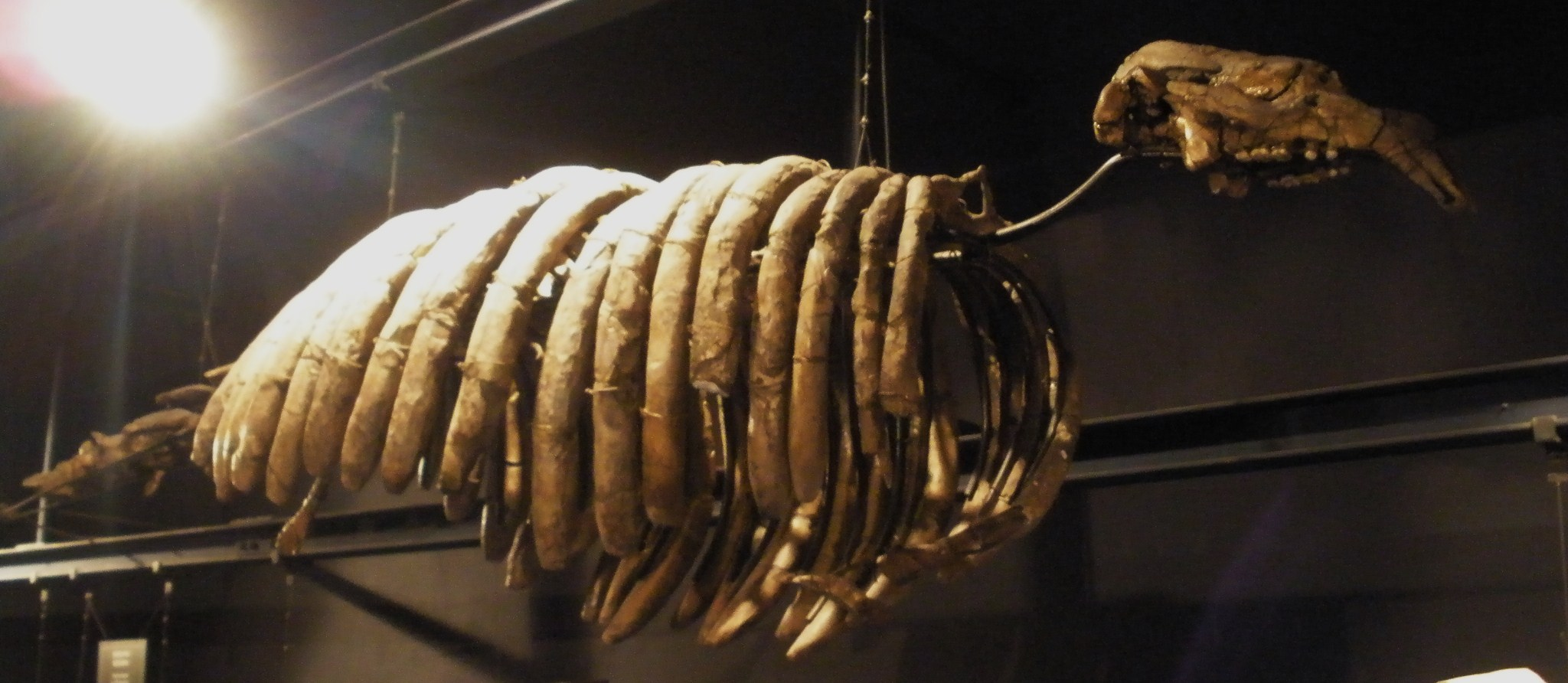
- Miosiren kocki skeleton

Scientific classification
- Domain: Eukaryota
- Kingdom: Animalia
- Phylum: Chordata
- Class: Mammalia
- Order: Sirenia
- Family: Trichechidae
- Subfamily: †Miosireninae
- Genus: †Miosiren; Dollo, 1889

Species
- Miosiren canhami (Flower, 1874); Miosiren kocki Dollo, 1889 (type)

= Miosiren =

Miosiren Temporal range: Early Miocene

Genus of manatee

Miosiren is an extinct genus of manatee from the Early Miocene of southeastern England (Suffolk) and Antwerp, Belgium.

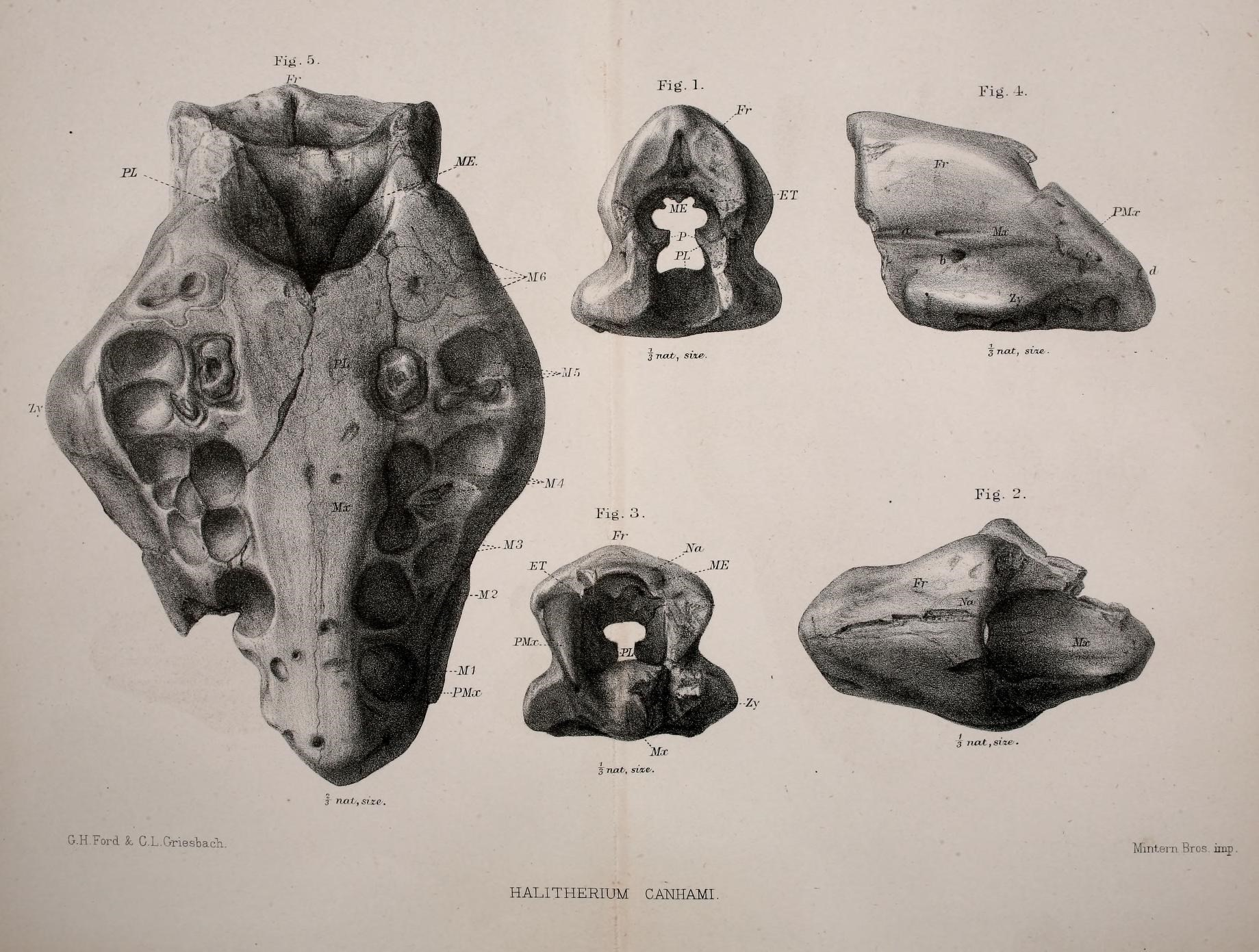
M. canhami fossils

Two species are recognized, M. canhami and M. kocki.

== Phylogeny ==
A 2014 cladistic analysis of extinct sirenians recovered Miosiren as a close relative of Anomotherium in a separate subfamily within Trichechidae, Miosireninae.

== See also ==
- Evolution of sirenians
