= Callistosiren =

Callistosiren Temporal range: Chattian

Scientific classification
- Kingdom: Animalia
- Phylum: Chordata
- Class: Mammalia
- Order: Sirenia
- Family: Dugongidae
- Subfamily: Dugonginae
- Genus: †Callistosiren; Velez-Juarbe and Domning, 2015

Species
- C. boriquensis Velez-Juarbe and Domning, 2015 (type)

Extinct genus of mammal

Callistosiren is an extinct genus of mammal which existed in what is now Puerto Rico during the late Oligocene (Chattian).
