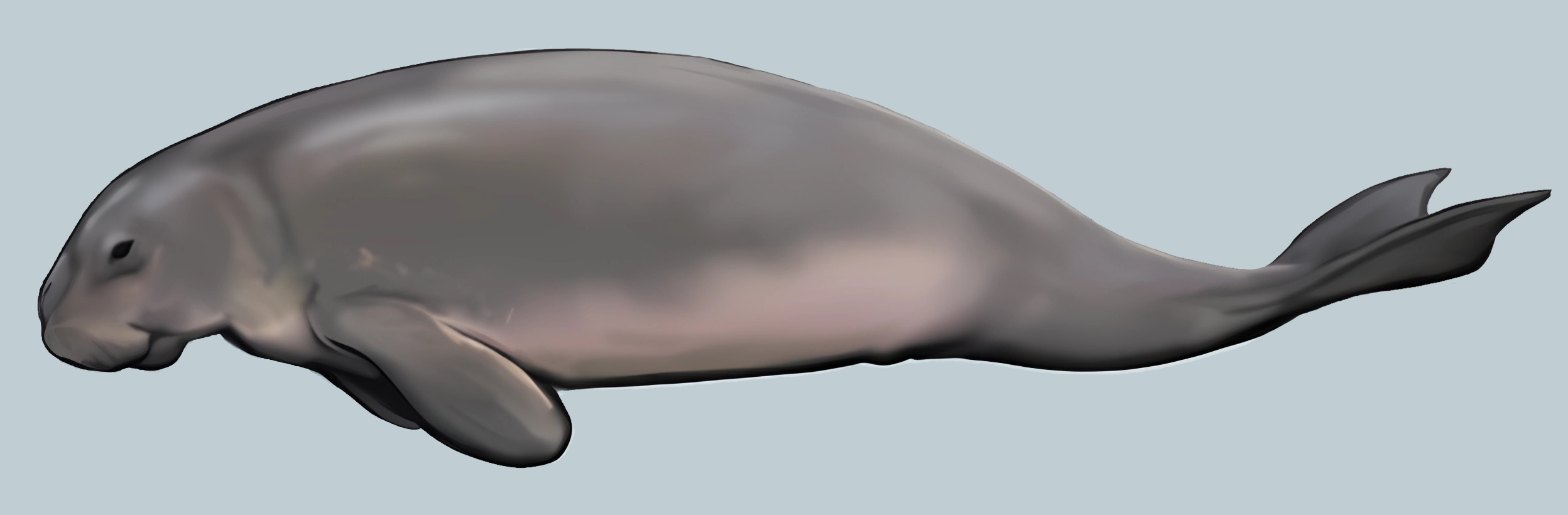

Scientific classification
- Kingdom: Animalia
- Phylum: Chordata
- Class: Mammalia
- Order: Sirenia
- Family: Dugongidae
- Subfamily: Dugonginae
- Genus: †Nanosiren; Domning, 2001
- Species: †N. garciae

Binomial name
- †Nanosiren garciae Domning, 2001

= Nanosiren =

Nanosiren Temporal range: Serravallian–Zanclean

Extinct genus of mammals

Nanosiren garciae is an extinct sirenian dugong that lived in warm shallow seas in what is now Venezuela, approximately 11.610—3.6 Ma during the Miocene and Pliocene. The species is listed in the Paleobiology Database, funded by the Australian Research Council.

In their book, Ecology and Conservation of the Sirenia: Dugongs and Manatees, authors Helena Marsh, Thomas J. O'Shea and John E. Reynolds III, describe the evolution of Nanosiren garciae from the Crenatosiren lineage, and argue that their small size allowed them access to very shallow water unavailable to larger sea mammals.

== Taxonomy ==
Nanosiren garciae was named by Domning and Aguilera (2008). Its name was attributed to Domning, not Domning and Aguilera. It was assigned to Dugonginae by Domning and Aguilera (2008).

== Description ==
Nanosiren was named in 2008 based on fossils uncovered from the Bone Valley Formation near Tampa, Florida. It is the smallest known post-Eocene sirenian, with body lengths of about 2 meters and weighing about 150 kg. Newborn nanosirens may have weighed only 6.8 kg. Its small size gave rise to the naming of its genus as Nanosiren, from the Greek for a "dwarf siren". These mammals were of shallow draft and possessed small, conical tusks, suggesting they foraged in shallower waters than their dugong relatives. Nanosiren likely fed on smaller seagrasses near shorelines. They thrived approximately 5 million years ago during the Hemphillian age.

A map of locations where fossils of Nanosiren garciae has been created, ranging from Chile and Peru in South America to the United States, can be found at the Global Biodiversity Information Facility.

The species was described and named by Daryl P. Domning of Howard University and Orangel A. Aguilera of the Universidad Nacional Experimental Francisco de Miranda, Venezuela in 2008, along with a second plausible species Nanosiren sanchezi. The name was chosen to commemorate famed Florida paleontologist Frank A. Garcia, who uncovered many fossil samples of the extinct mammal from the Bone Valley phosphate mines in Central Florida.
