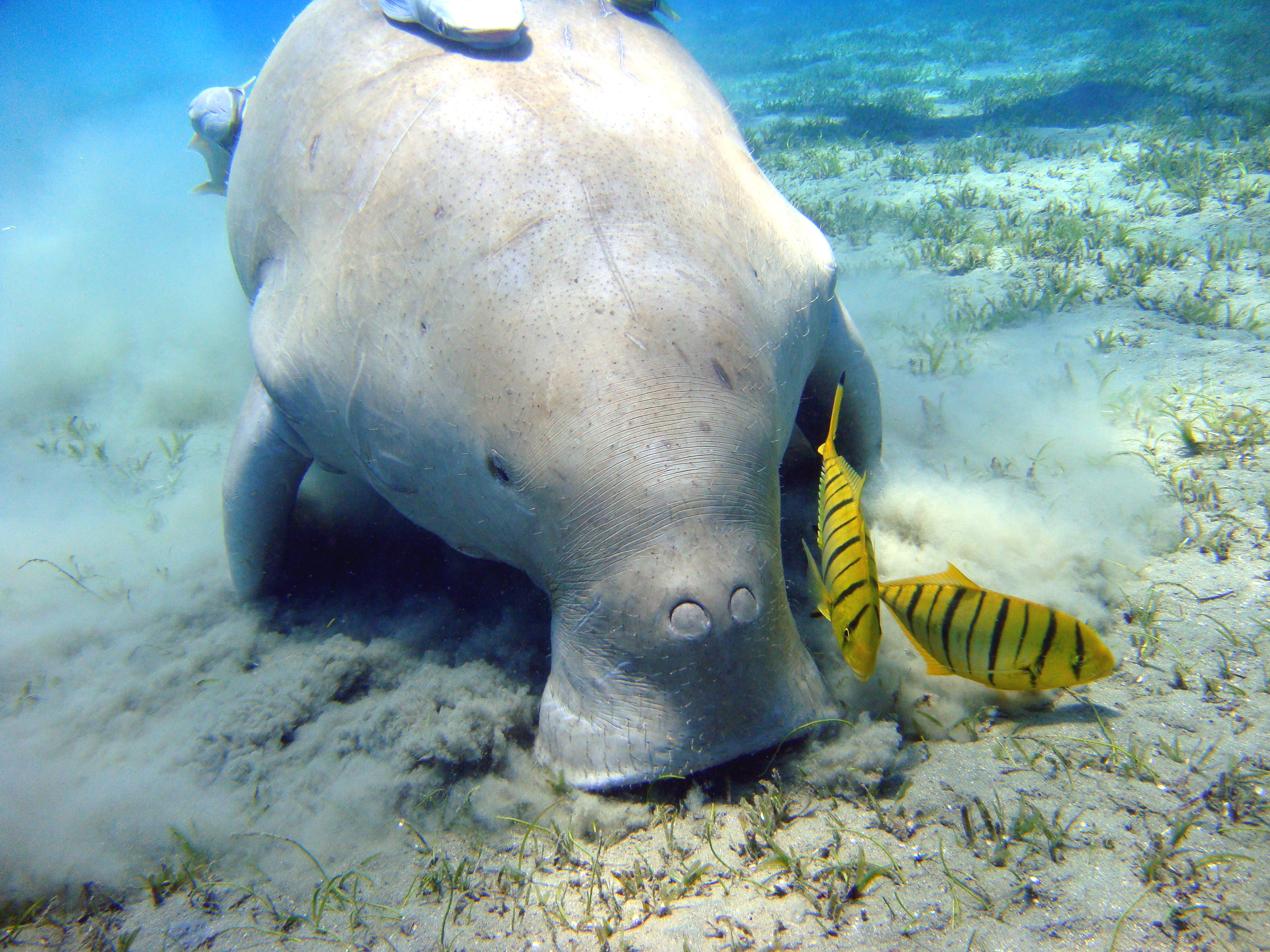
- A dugong in Marsa Alam

Scientific classification
- Kingdom: Animalia
- Phylum: Chordata
- Class: Mammalia
- Infraclass: Placentalia
- Order: Sirenia
- Family: Dugongidae; Gray, 1821

Recent genera
- Dugong †Hydrodamalis; For fossil species, see text

= Dugongidae =

Dugongidae Temporal range: Late Eocene-Holocene

Family of mammals

Dugongidae is a family in the order of Sirenia. The family has one surviving species, the dugong (Dugong dugon), one recently extinct species, Steller's sea cow (Hydrodamalis gigas), and a number of extinct genera known from fossil records.

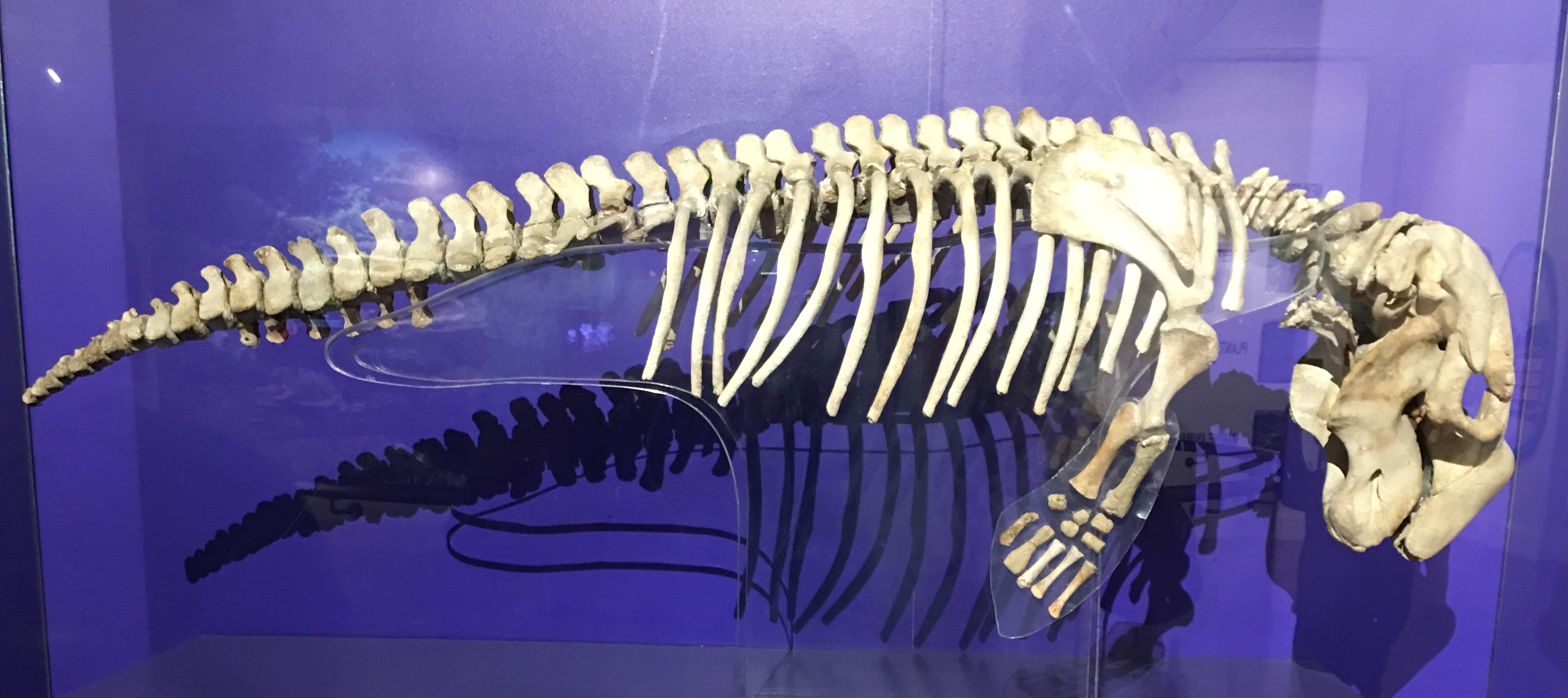
Dugong skeleton displayed at Philippine National Museum

== Taxonomy ==
- Family Dugongidae
  - Genus †Anisosiren
  - Genus †Caribosiren
  - Genus †Indosiren
  - Genus †Lentiarenium
  - Genus †Kaupitherium
  - Genus †Paralitherium
  - Genus †Priscosiren
  - Genus †Prohalicore
  - Genus †Sirenavus
  - Subfamily †Halitheriinae
    - Genus †Halitherium (nomen dubium)
  - Subfamily Dugonginae
    - Genus †Bharatisiren
    - Genus †Callistosiren
    - Genus †Crenatosiren
    - Genus †Corystosiren
    - Genus †Culebratherium
    - Genus †Dioplotherium
    - Genus †Domningia
    - Genus Dugong
      - Species Dugong dugon, dugong
    - Genus †Italosiren
    - Genus †Kharisiren
    - Genus †Kutchisiren
    - Genus †Nanosiren
    - Genus †Norosiren
    - Genus †Rytiodus
    - Genus †Salwasiren
    - Genus †Xenosiren
  - Subfamily †Metaxytheriinae
    - Genus †Metaxytherium
  - Subfamily †Hydrodamalinae
    - Genus †Dusisiren
    - Genus †Hydrodamalis
      - Species †Hydrodamalis cuestae
      - Species †Hydrodamalis spissa
      - Species †Hydrodamalis gigas, Steller's sea cow

The genera Eosiren, Eotheroides, and Prototherium have been assigned to Halitheriinae in the past, but recent cladistic analysis recovers these genera as basal to the clade formed by Trichechidae and Dugongidae. Moreover, Halitheriinae is paraphyletic with respect to Dugonginae and Hydrodamalinae, and further use of the name should be discontinued because the type genus is based on a non-diagnostic tooth.

== Phylogeny ==
- Afrotheria
  - Afroinsectiphilia
    - Tubulidentata
      Orycteropodidae
    - Afroinsectivora
      - Macroscelidea
        Macroscelididae
      - Afrosoricida
        - Chrysochloridae
        - Tenrecidae
  - Paenungulata
    - Hyracoidea
      Procaviidae
    - Tethytheria
      - Proboscidea
        Elephantidae
      - Sirenia
        - Dugongidae
        - Trichechidae
