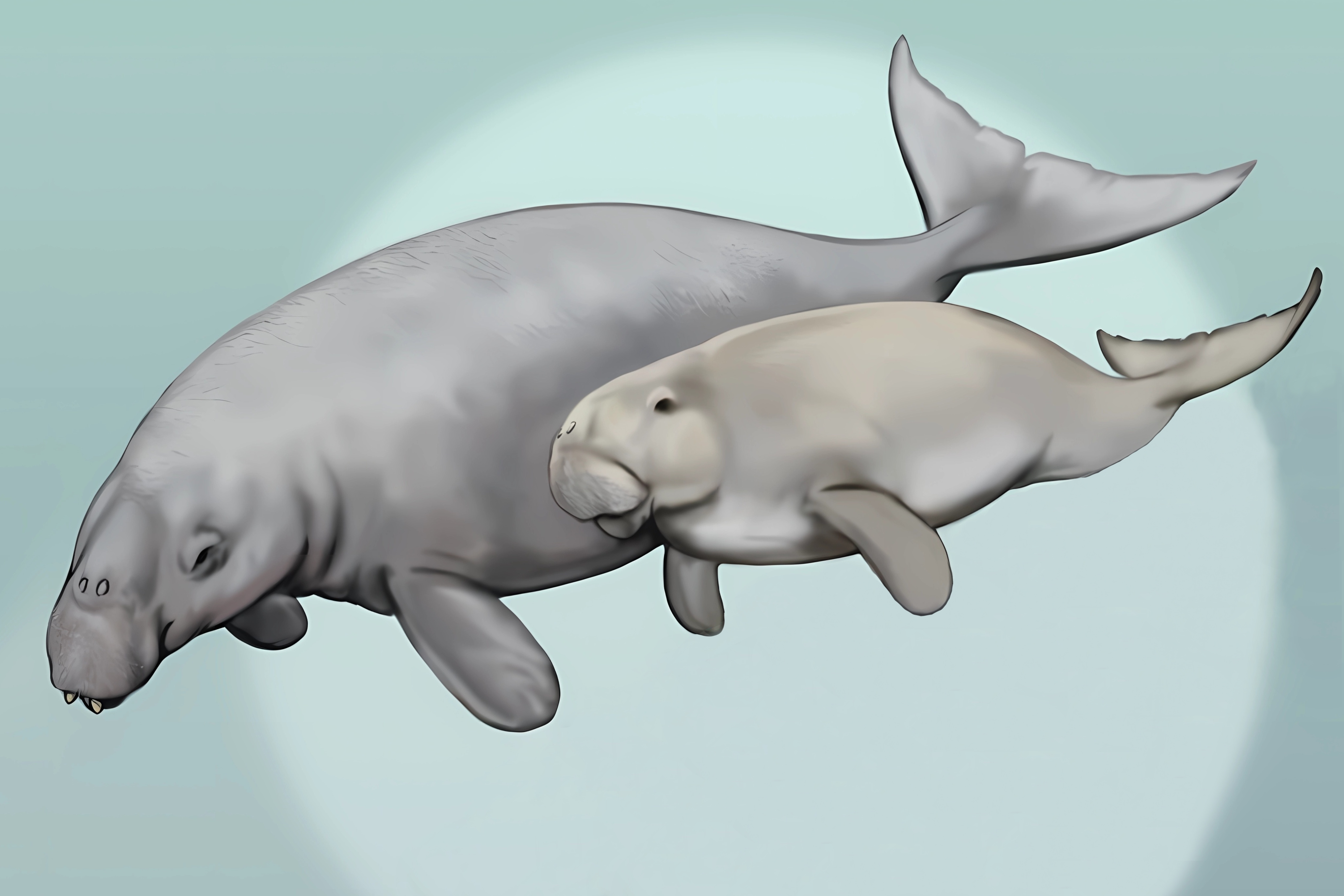
- Bharatisiren kachchhensis and Kutchisiren cylindrica

Scientific classification
- Kingdom: Animalia
- Phylum: Chordata
- Class: Mammalia
- Order: Sirenia
- Family: Dugongidae
- Subfamily: Dugonginae
- Genus: †Bharatisiren; Bajpai and Domning, 1997

Species
- B. kachchhensis (Bajpai et al., 1987) (type)

= Bharatisiren =

Bharatisiren Temporal range: Aquitanian

Genus of mammals

Bharatisiren is an extinct genus of mammal which existed in what is now India during the early Miocene (Aquitanian) period.

== Taxonomy ==
The type species of Bharatisiren, B. kachchhebsis, was originally named as a species of Metaxytherium, M. kachchhebsis, by Bajpai et al. (1987) from the Aquitanian-age Khari Nadi Formation of western India. Bajpai and Domning (1997) however, judged M. kachchhensis generically distinct enough from the Metaxytherium type species to warrant its own genus, Bharatisiren.
