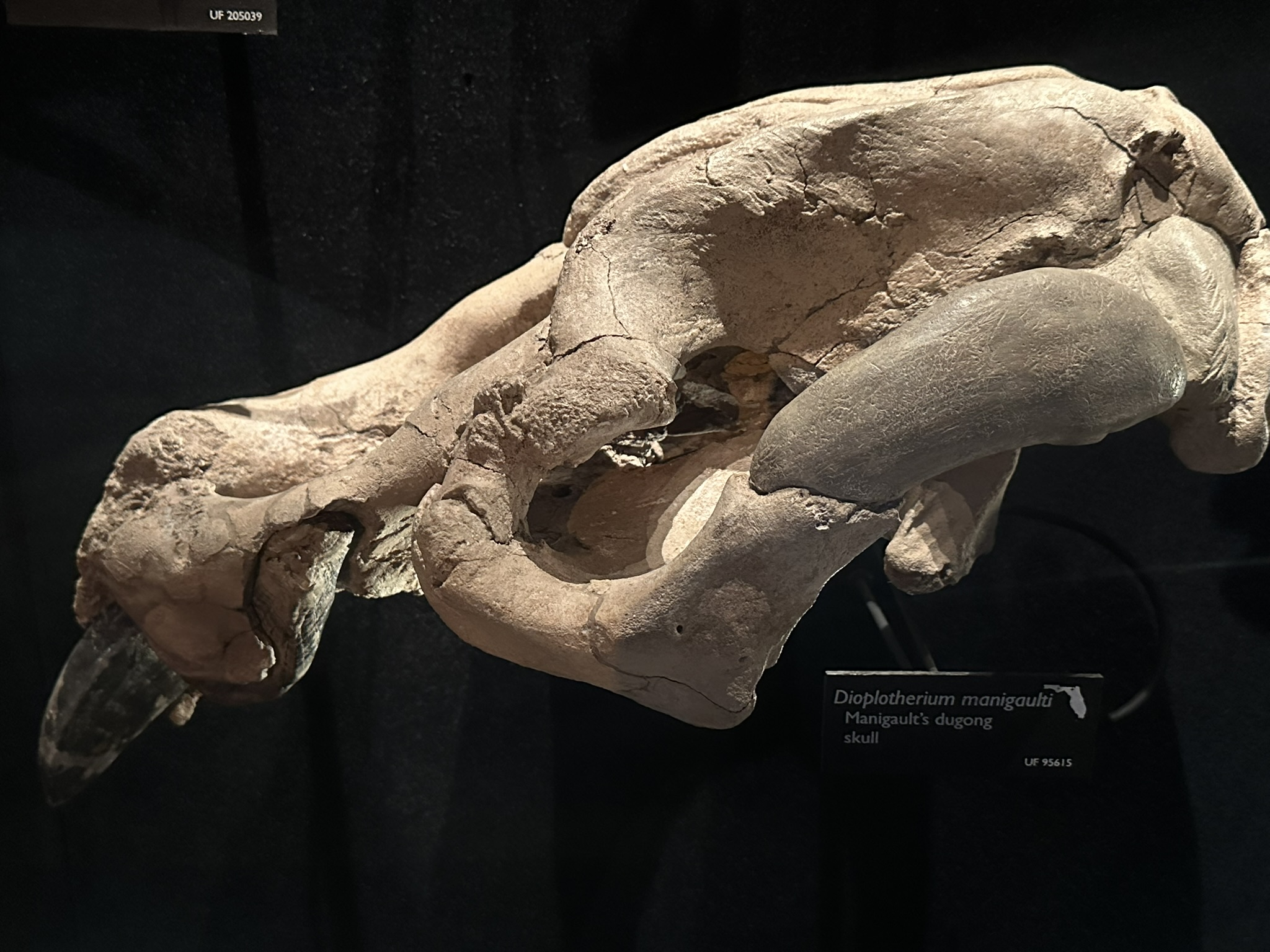
- Skull of D. manigaulti, Florida Museum of Natural History

Scientific classification
- Domain: Eukaryota
- Kingdom: Animalia
- Phylum: Chordata
- Class: Mammalia
- Order: Sirenia
- Family: Dugongidae
- Subfamily: Dugonginae
- Genus: †Dioplotherium; Cope, 1883

Species
- D. allisoni Kilmer, 1965; D. manigaulti Cope, 1883 (type)

= Dioplotherium =

Dioplotherium Temporal range: Early Miocene–Late Miocene

Extinct genus of mammal

Dioplotherium is an extinct genus of sirenian related to the dugongs, known from Neogene-aged deposits from southern North America.

== Species ==
- Dioplotherium allisoni, described as Halianassa allisoni by Kilmer in 1965 from remains found in the middle Miocene Isidro Formation of Baja California, Mexico, and known from marine deposits in Baja California and California. The species was referred to Dioplotherium by Domning in 1989.
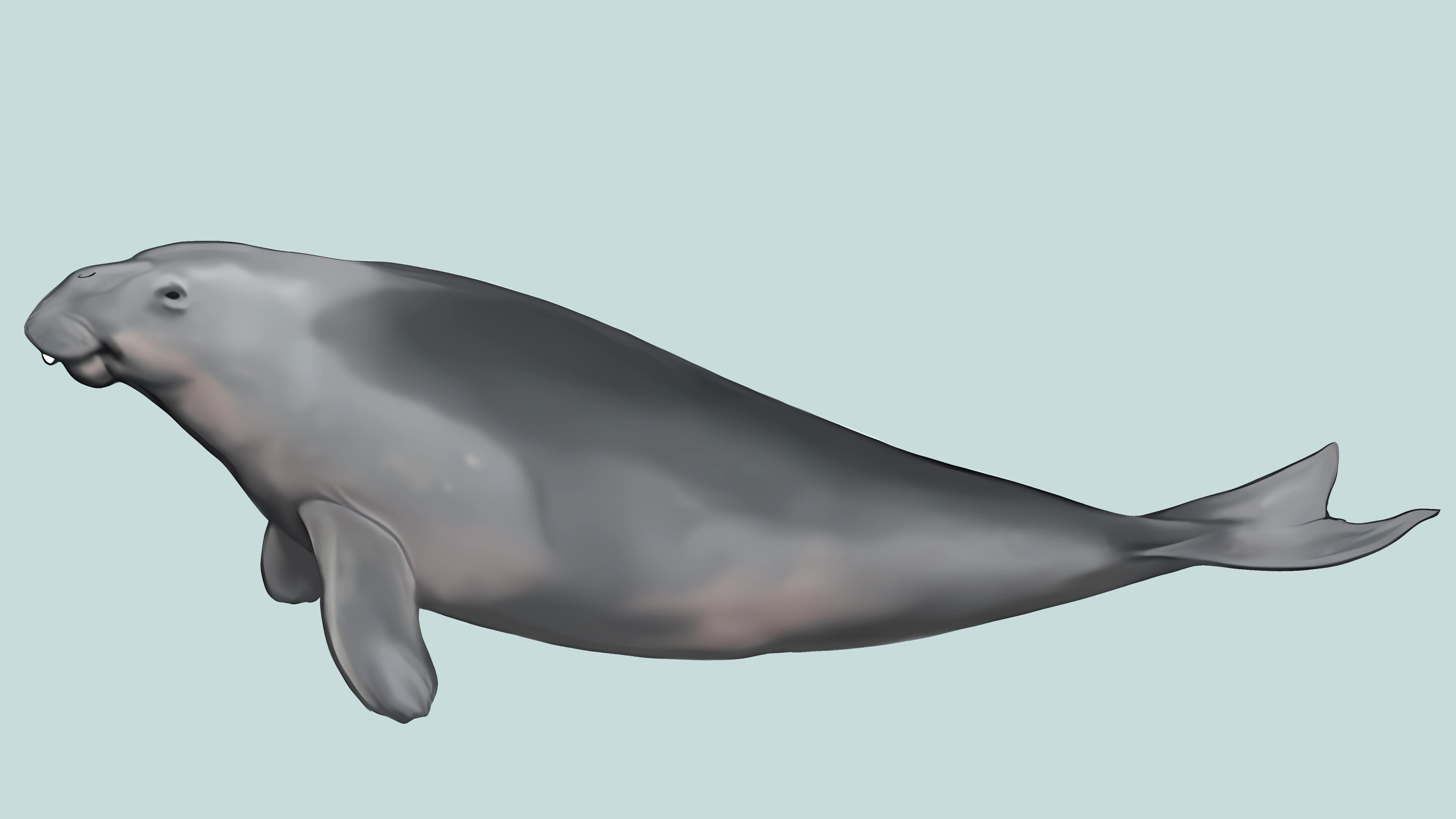
  Life restoration of D. manigaulti
- Dioplotherium manigaulti, was described by Edward Drinker Cope in 1883 on the basis of a partial premaxilla with a tusk found near Charleston, South Carolina. Nothing more was known of the species until a nearly complete skull was found in the Suwannee River by Gary S. Morgan in 1985. Additional fossils ascribed to D. manigaulti have been found in the Charleston Phosphate Beds and Ashley River phosphate deposits in South Carolina, and in exposures of the Hawthorn Group in Jackson County, Florida.
