= Xenosiren =

Xenosiren Temporal range: Miocene

Scientific classification
- Kingdom: Animalia
- Phylum: Chordata
- Class: Mammalia
- Order: Sirenia
- Family: Dugongidae
- Subfamily: Dugonginae
- Genus: †Xenosiren; Domning, 1989

Species
- X. yucateca Domning, 1989 (type)

Xenosiren is an extinct genus of dugong which existed in Mexico during the Miocene. The genus is classified in the subfamily Dugonginae as well as in the family Dugongidae. The genus contains only 1 species, X. yucateca. The size estimate of Xenosiren may have been larger than the modern manatee, presumably the same size as the West Indian manatee, an extant species in the manatee family.
