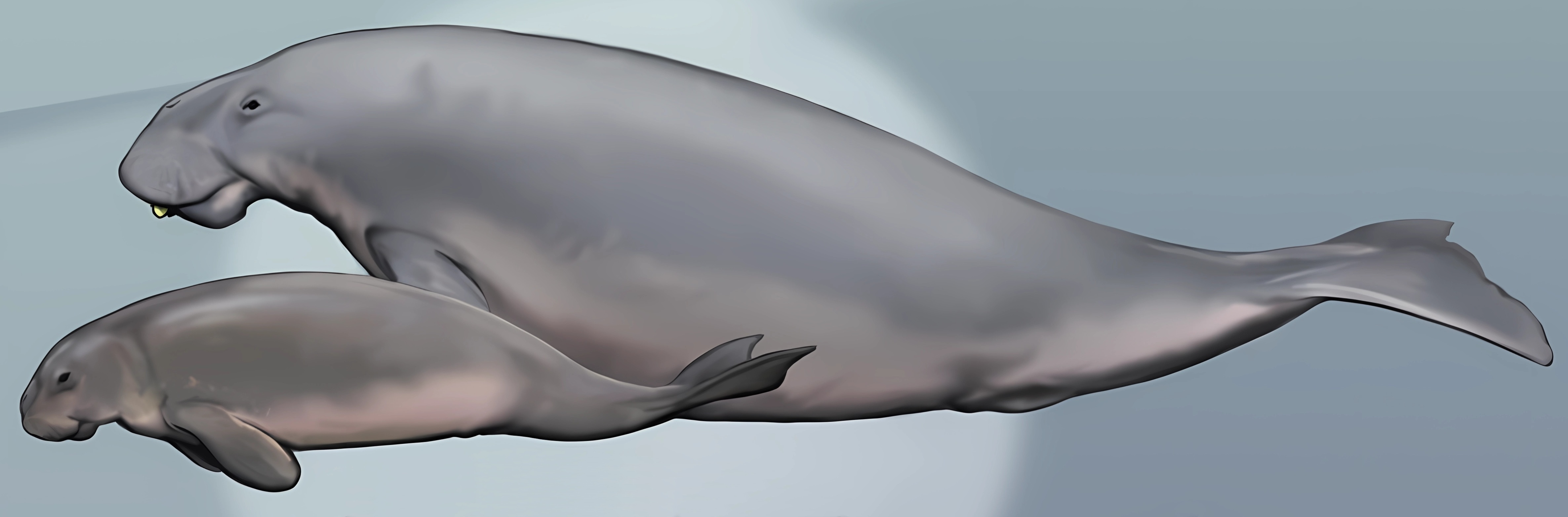

Scientific classification
- Kingdom: Animalia
- Phylum: Chordata
- Class: Mammalia
- Order: Sirenia
- Family: Dugongidae
- Subfamily: Dugonginae
- Genus: †Corystosiren; Domning, 1990

Species
- C. varguezi Domning, 1990 (type)

= Corystosiren =

Corystosiren Temporal range: Zanclean

Extinct genus of mammal

Corystosiren is an extinct genus of dugongid sirenian mammal which existed in the waters of the Caribbean Basin during the Early Pliocene. Fossils have been found in the Yucatán Peninsula, Mexico, and Florida.

== Palaeobiology ==
=== Palaeoecology ===
Corystosiren varguezi, based on its high δ^{13}C values, was a specialist that fed primarily on seagrasses.
