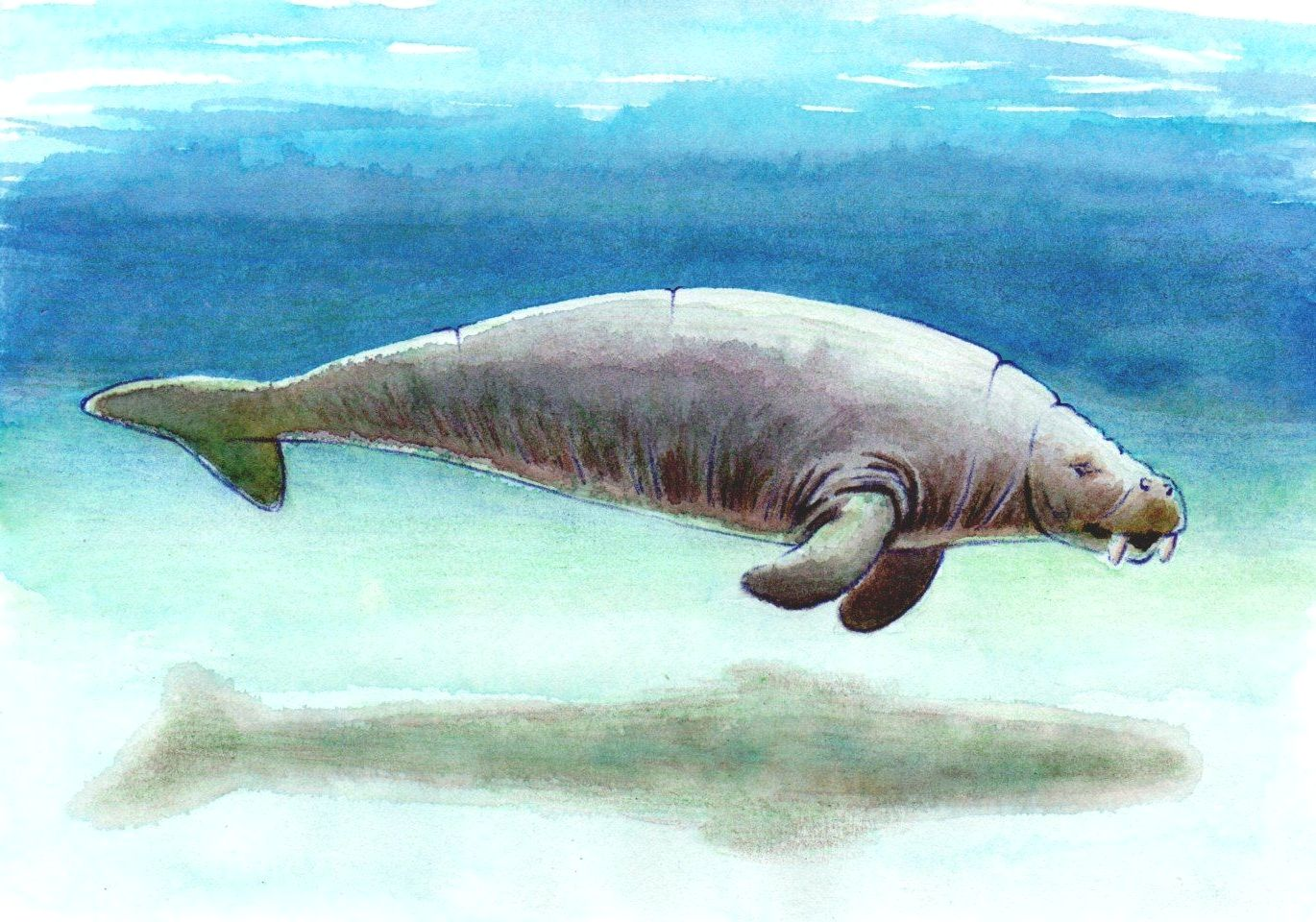

Scientific classification
- Domain: Eukaryota
- Kingdom: Animalia
- Phylum: Chordata
- Class: Mammalia
- Order: Sirenia
- Family: Dugongidae
- Subfamily: Dugonginae
- Genus: †Rytiodus

Species
- R. capgrandi (type species) Lartet, 1886; R. heali Domning, Sorbi, 2011

= Rytiodus =

Rytiodus Temporal range: Miocene

Extinct genus of sirenian

Rytiodus (meaning Rytina, "wrinkled", an old name for Steller's sea cow) is an extinct genus of sirenian, whose fossils have been discovered in France, Europe and Libya.

== Description ==
With a length of 6 m (20 ft), Rytiodus was about twice the size as modern sirenians, surpassed only by Steller's sea cow, which was up to 8–9 m (26–30 ft) long. Like its closest modern relatives, the dugongs, Rytiodus had a pair of flippers, a streamlined body and a tail fin. Its flattened snout allowed it to feed in shallow coastal waters. Rytiodus had short tusks which it may have used to extract food from the sand.

== See also ==
- Evolution of sirenians
