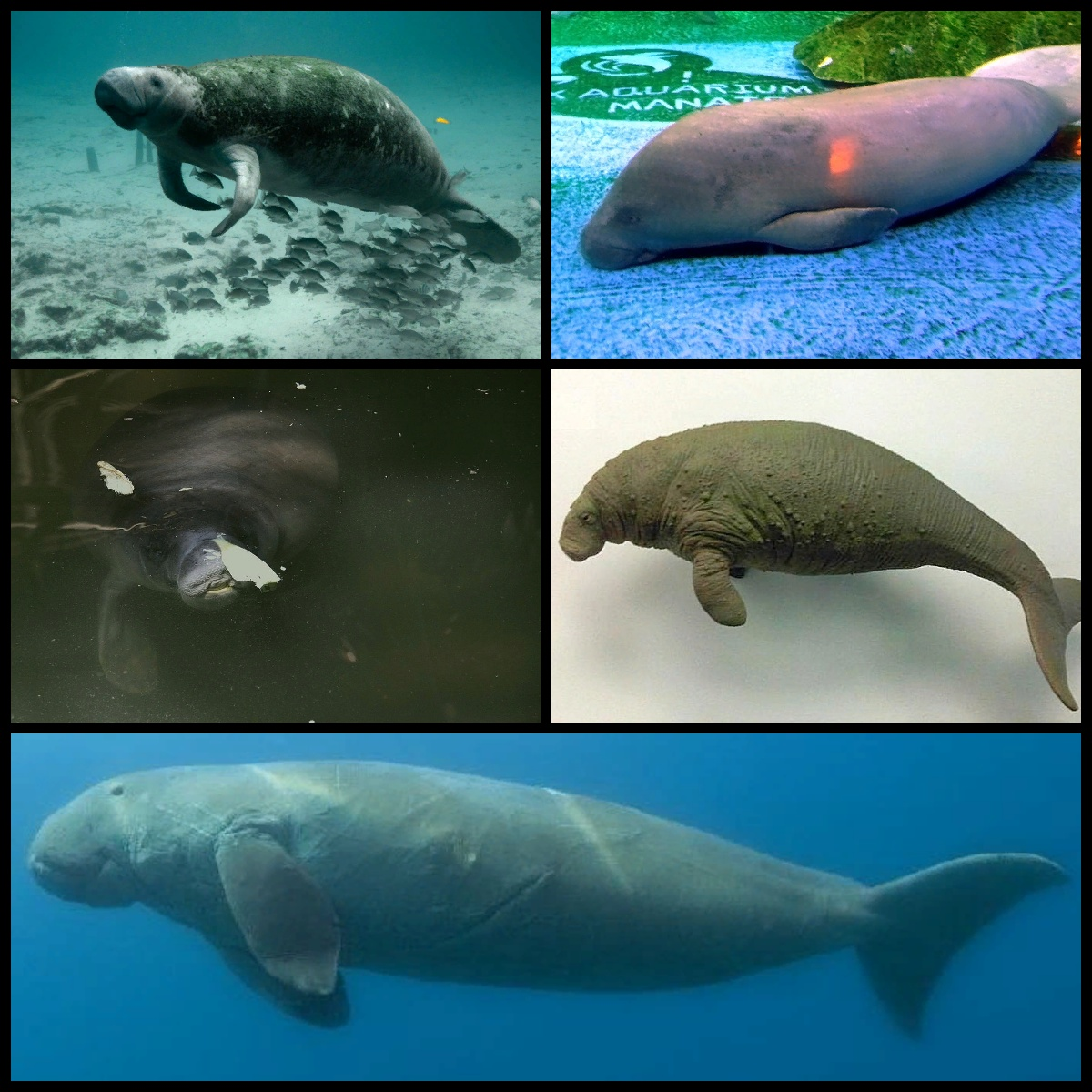
- Clockwise from upper left: West Indian manatee, African manatee, Steller's sea cow, dugong, Amazonian manatee

Scientific classification
- Kingdom: Animalia
- Phylum: Chordata
- Class: Mammalia
- Clade: Paenungulatomorpha
- Grandorder: Paenungulata
- Mirorder: Tethytheria
- Order: Sirenia; Illiger, 1811

Families
- Dugongidae; Trichechidae; †Prorastomidae; †Protosirenidae
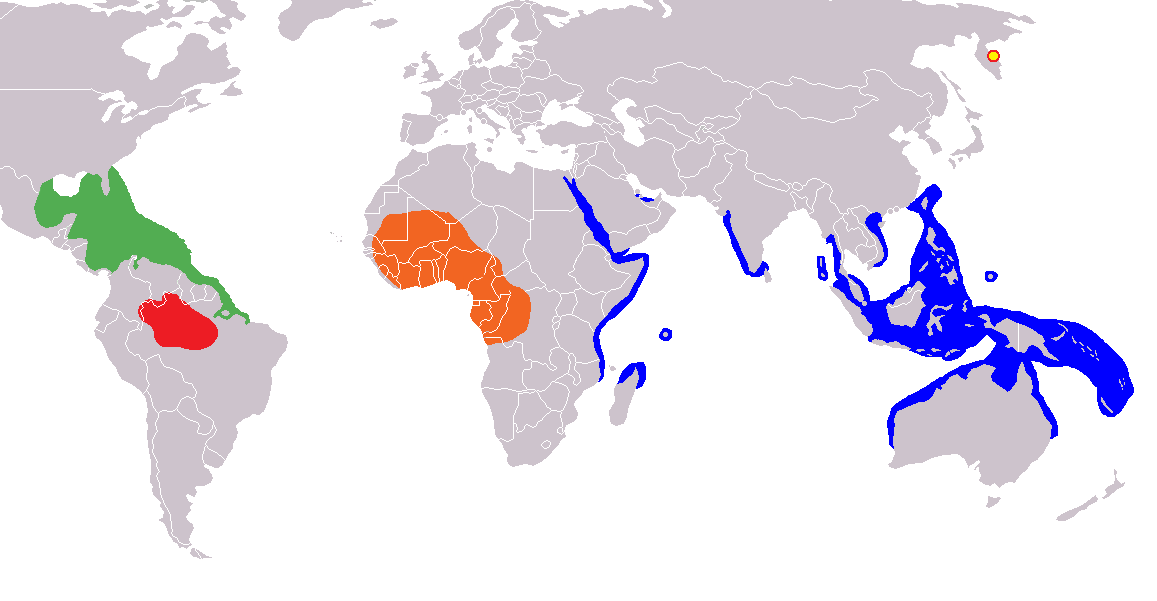
- West Indian in green, Amazonian in red, African in orange, dugong in blue, Steller's sea cow circled (yellow)

Synonyms
- Halobioidea Ameghino, 1889; Herbivorae Gray, 1821; Phycoceta Haeckel, 1866; Sirenoidea van Beneden, 1855; Sireniformes Kinman, 1994; Trichechiformes Hay, 1923

= Sirenia =

Sirenia Temporal range: Early Eocene – Holocene, 55.8–0 Ma

Order of aquatic herbivorous mammals

The Sirenia (/saɪˈriːniə/ sy-REE-nee-ə), commonly referred to as sea cows or sirenians, are an order of fully aquatic, herbivorous mammals that inhabit swamps, rivers, estuaries, marine wetlands, and coastal marine waters. The extant Sirenia comprise two distinct families:

- Dugongidae (the dugong and the now extinct Steller's sea cow) and
- Trichechidae (manatees, namely the Amazonian manatee, West Indian manatee, and West African manatee) with a total of three species.

The Protosirenidae (Eocene sirenians) and Prorastomidae (terrestrial sirenians) families are extinct. Sirenians are classified in the clade Paenungulata, alongside the elephants and the hyraxes, and evolved in the Eocene 50 million years ago (mya). The Dugongidae diverged from the Trichechidae in the late Eocene or early Oligocene (30–35 mya).

Sirenians grow to between 2.5 and 4 metres (8.2 and 13.1 feet) in length and 1,500 kilograms (3,300 pounds) in weight. The recently extinct Steller's sea cow was the largest known sirenian to have lived, reaching lengths of 10 metres (33 feet) and weights of 5 to 10 tonnes (5.5 to 11.0 short tons).

Sirenians have a large, fusiform body which reduces drag through the water and heavy bones that act as ballast to counteract the buoyancy of their blubber. They have a thin layer of blubber and consequently are sensitive to temperature fluctuations, which cause large-scale migrations when water temperatures dip too low. Sirenians are slow-moving, typically coasting at 8 kilometres per hour (5.0 miles per hour), but they can reach 24 kilometres per hour (15 miles per hour) in short bursts. They use their strong lips to pull out seagrasses, consuming 10–15% of their body weight per day.

While breathing, sirenians hold just their nostrils above the surface, sometimes standing on their tails to do so. They typically inhabit warm, shallow, coastal waters, or rivers. They are mainly herbivorous, but have been known to consume animals such as jellyfish. Males typically mate with more than one female and may gather in leks to mate. Sirenians are K-selected, displaying parental care.

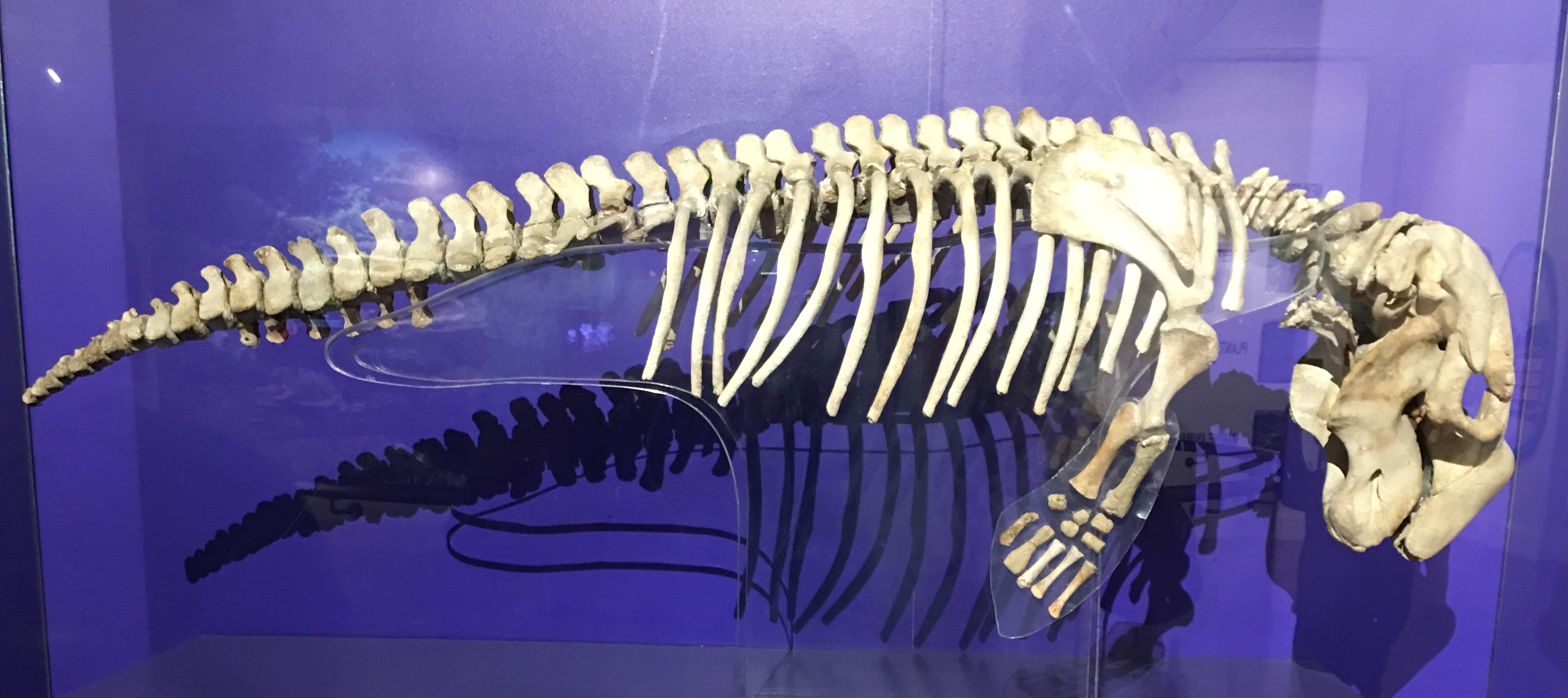
Dugong skeleton displayed at Philippine National Museum

The meat, oil, bones, and skins of sirenians are commercially valuable. Mortality is often caused by direct hunting from humans or by other human-induced causes, such as habitat destruction, entanglement in fishing gear, and watercraft collisions. Steller's sea cow was finally driven to extinction due to overhunting in 1768.

== Taxonomy ==
=== Etymology ===
Sirenia, commonly sirenians, are also referred to by the common name sirens, deriving from the sirens of Greek mythology.

=== Classification ===
Sirenians are classified within the cohort Afrotheria in the clade Paenungulata, alongside Proboscidea (elephants), Hyracoidea (hyraxes), Embrithopoda, Desmostylia, and Afroinsectiphilia. This clade was first established by George Gaylord Simpson in 1945 on the basis of anatomical evidence, such as testicondy and similar fetal development. The Paenungulata, along with the Afrotheria, are one of the most well-supported mammalian clades in molecular phylogeny. Sirenia, Proboscidae, and Desmotylia are grouped together in the clade Tethytheria. On the basis of morphological similarities, Tethytheria, Perissodactyla, and Hyracoidea were previously thought to be grouped together as the Altungulata, but this has been invalidated by molecular data.

- Afrotheria
  - Paenungulata
    - Hyracoidea
      Procaviidae
    - Tethytheria
      - Sirenia
        - Trichechidae
        - Dugongidae
      - Proboscidea
        Elephantidae
  - Afroinsectiphilia
    - Tubulidentata
      Orycteropodidae
    - Afroinsectivora
      - Macroscelidea
        Macroscelididae
      - Afrosoricida
        - Chrysochloridae
        - Tenrecomorpha
          - Potamogalidae
          - Tenrecidae

A cladogram showing the position of the Sirenia within Afrotheria on the basis of molecular evidence

==== Sirenia families ====
† = Extinct

Family Dugongidae:

- Genus Dugong
  - D. dugon
- Genus †Anisosiren
  - †A. pannonica
- Genus †Indosiren
  - †I. javanense
- Genus †Bharatisiren
  - †B. indica
- Genus †Callistosiren
  - †C. boriquensis
- Genus †Crenatosiren
  - †C. olseni
- Genus †Corystosiren
  - †C. varguezi
- Genus †Dioplotherium
  - †D. allisoni
  - †D. manigualti
- Genus †Domningia
  - †D. sodhae
- Genus †Kutchisiren
  - †K. cylindrica
- Genus †Nanosiren
  - †N. garciae
  - †N. sanchezi
- Genus †Rytiodus
  - †R. capgrandi
  - †R. heali
- Genus †Xenosiren
  - †X. yucateca
- Genus †Caribosiren
  - †C. turneri
- Genus †Halitherium
  - †H. alleni
  - †H. schinzii
- Genus †Paralitherium
  - †P. tarkanyense
- Genus †Priscosiren
  - †P. atlantica
- Genus †Sirenavus
  - †S. hungaricus
- Genus †Metaxytherium
  - †M. albifontanum
  - †M. arctodites
  - †M. crataegense
  - †M. floridanum
  - †M. krahuletzi
  - †M. medium
  - †M. serresii
  - †M. subapenninum
- Genus †Dusisiren
  - †D. dewana
  - †D. jordani
  - †D. reinharti
  - †D. takasatensis
- Genus †Hydrodamalis
  - †H. cuestae
  - †H. gigas

Family Trichechidae:

- Genus Trichechus
  - T. manatus
  - T. senegalensis
  - T. inunguis
- Genus †Anomotherium
  - †A. langewieschei
- Genus †Miosiren
  - †M. canhami
  - †M. kocki
- Genus †Potamosiren
  - †P. magdalenensis
- Genus †Ribodon
  - †R. limbatus

†Family Protosirenidae:

- Genus †Ashokia
  - †A. antiqua
- Genus †Libysiren
  - †L. sickenbergi
- Genus †Protosiren
  - †P. eothene
  - †P. fraasi
  - †P. minima
  - †P. sattaensis
  - †P. smithae

†Family Prorastomidae:

- Genus †Pezosiren
  - †P. portelli
- Genus †Prorastomus
  - †P. sirenoides

Extant order Sirenia – two genera, four species
Common name	Genus	Scientific name	Status	Distribution	Picture
West Indian manatee	Trichechus (manatees)	T. manatus Linnaeus, 1758	VU^{IUCN}	Coastal areas of the Caribbean sea	
African manatee	Trichechus (manatees)	T. senegalensis Link, 1795	VU^{IUCN}		
Amazonian manatee	Trichechus (manatees)	T. inunguis Natterer, 1883	VU^{IUCN}		
Dugong	Dugong	D. dugon Müller, 1776	VU^{IUCN}		

Distribution

The warm shallow waters of the equator have been the center of sirenian habitation. The northernmost living population, the Florida subspecies of the West Indian manatee (T. manatus latirostris), inhabits the coast and frequents freshwater springs, power plants, and canals in Florida to stay warm during the winter. Individuals may migrate north in the warm summer months, some up to 1,000 kilometers (about 621.37 mi) from their winter range. The Antillean subspecies (T. manatus manatus) occurs in the Caribbean, South America, and Central America and frequent drowned cays, mangroves, lagoons, and sea grass beds.

The Amazonian manatee (T. inunguis) has been documented in all parts of the Amazon River Basin in South America. River channels that connect allow easy travel to other waterways where food may be plentiful. The Amazonian manatee lives only in freshwater.

The West African manatee (T. senegalensis) lives in murky isolated inland mangroves and coastal flats in West Africa. It is found in waters above 18 °C (64 °F), and its range spans Senegal to Angola.

The dugong (Dugong dugong), the closest living relative of Steller's sea cow, lives in the Indo-West Pacific Ocean in more than 40 different countries. They are coastal animals supported by wide protected sea grass meadows.

Steller's sea cow was discovered in 1741 around islands in the Bering Sea and was specialized for cold subarctic temperatures. It ranged from Alaska through the Amchitka and Aleutian Islands, and even to Japan. Steller's sea cow was reported to have congregated in shallow, sandy areas along coastline and mouths of rivers and creeks to feed on kelp.

=== Evolution ===
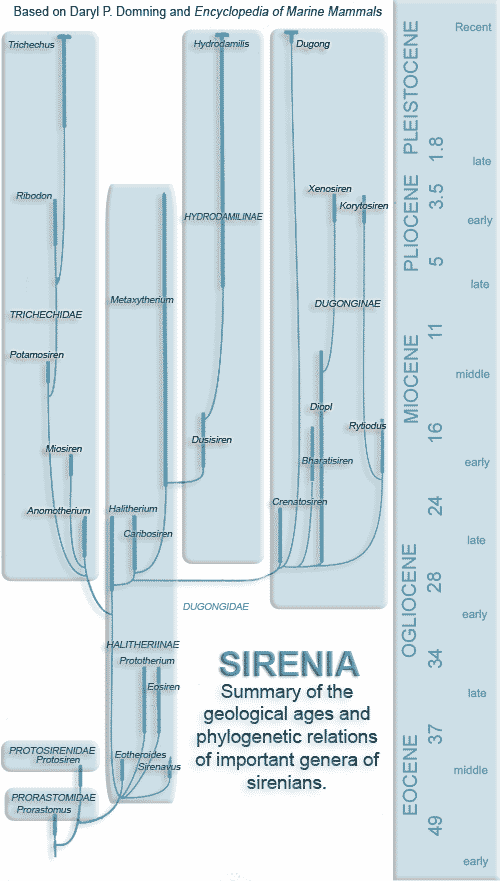
Cladogram showing the estimated times of divergence between sirenian taxa

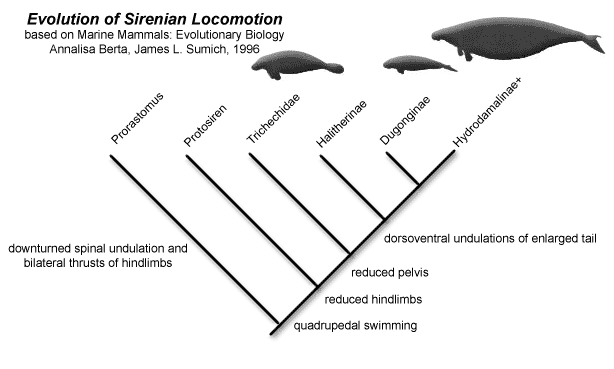
Anatomical changes of sirenian lineages

The evolution of sirenians is characterized by the appearance of several traits that are found in all sirenians. The nostrils are large and retracted, the upper-jaw bone contacts the frontal bone, the sagittal crest is missing, the mastoid fills the supratemporal fenestra (an opening on the top of the skull), there is a drop-like ectotympanic (a bony ring that holds the ear drum), and the bones are pachyosteosclerotic (dense and bulky).

Sirenians first appeared in the fossil record in the Early Eocene and diversified throughout the epoch. They inhabited rivers, estuaries, and nearshore marine waters. Sirenians, unlike other marine mammals such as cetaceans, lived in the New World. In Western Europe the first and oldest sirenian remains have been found in a new paleontological site, in Santa Brígida, Amer (La Selva, Catalonia, Spain). One of the earliest aquatic sirenians discovered is Prorastomus, which dates back to 40 million years ago, and the first known sirenian, the quadruped Pezosiren, lived 50 million years ago. An ancient sirenian fossil of a petrosal bone was found in Tunisia, dating back to approximately the same time as Prorastomus. This is the oldest sirenian fossil to be found in Africa and supports molecular data suggesting that sirenians may have originated in Africa. Prorastomidae and Protosirenidae, the earliest sirenian families, consisted of pig-like amphibious creatures who died out at the end of the Eocene. With the appearance of the Dugongidae at this time, sirenians had evolved the characteristics of the modern order, including an aquatic, streamlined body with flipper-like fore limbs and no hind limbs, and a powerful tail with horizontal caudal fins which uses an up-and-down motion to move them through the water.

The last of the sirenian families to appear, Trichechidae, apparently arose from early dugongids in the late Eocene or early Oligocene. In 1994, the family was expanded to include not only the subfamily Trichechinae (Potamosiren, Ribodon, and Trichechus), but also Miosireninae (Anomotherium and Miosiren). The African manatee and the West Indian manatee are more closely related to each other than to the Amazonian manatee.

Dugongidae comprises the subfamilies Dugonginae and Hydrodamalinae and the paraphyletic Halitheriinae. The tusks of modern-day dugongs may have originally been used for digging, but they are now used for social interaction. The genus Dugong probably originated in the Indo-Pacific.

== Description ==
=== Adaptations ===
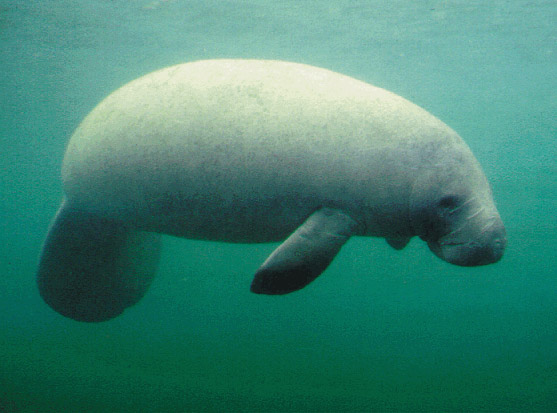
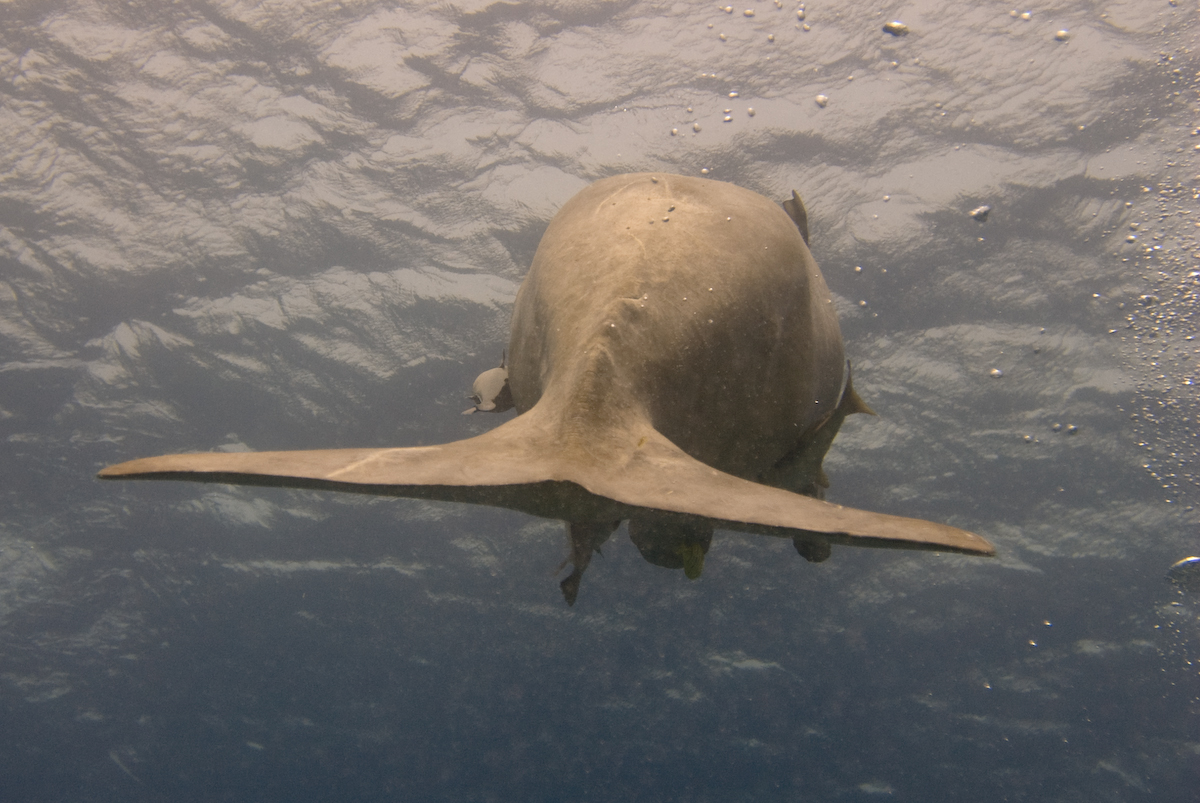
The paddle-shaped fluke of a manatee (left) vs. that of a dugong (right)

The tail fluke of a dugong is notched and similar to those of dolphins, whereas the tail fluke of manatee is paddle-shaped. The fluke is pumped up and down in long strokes to move the animal forward, or twisted to turn. The forelimbs are paddle-like flippers which aid in turning and slowing. Unlike manatees, the dugong lacks nails on its flippers, which are only 15% of a dugong's body length. Manatees generally glide at speeds of 8 kilometres per hour (5 mph), but can reach speeds of 24 kilometres per hour (15 mph) in short bursts. The body is fusiform to reduce drag in the water. Like those of cetaceans, the hind limbs are internal and vestigial. The snout is angled downwards to aid in bottom-feeding. Sirenians typically make two- to three-minute dives, but manatees can hold their breath for up to 15 minutes while resting and dugongs up to six minutes. They may stand on their tails to hold their heads above water.

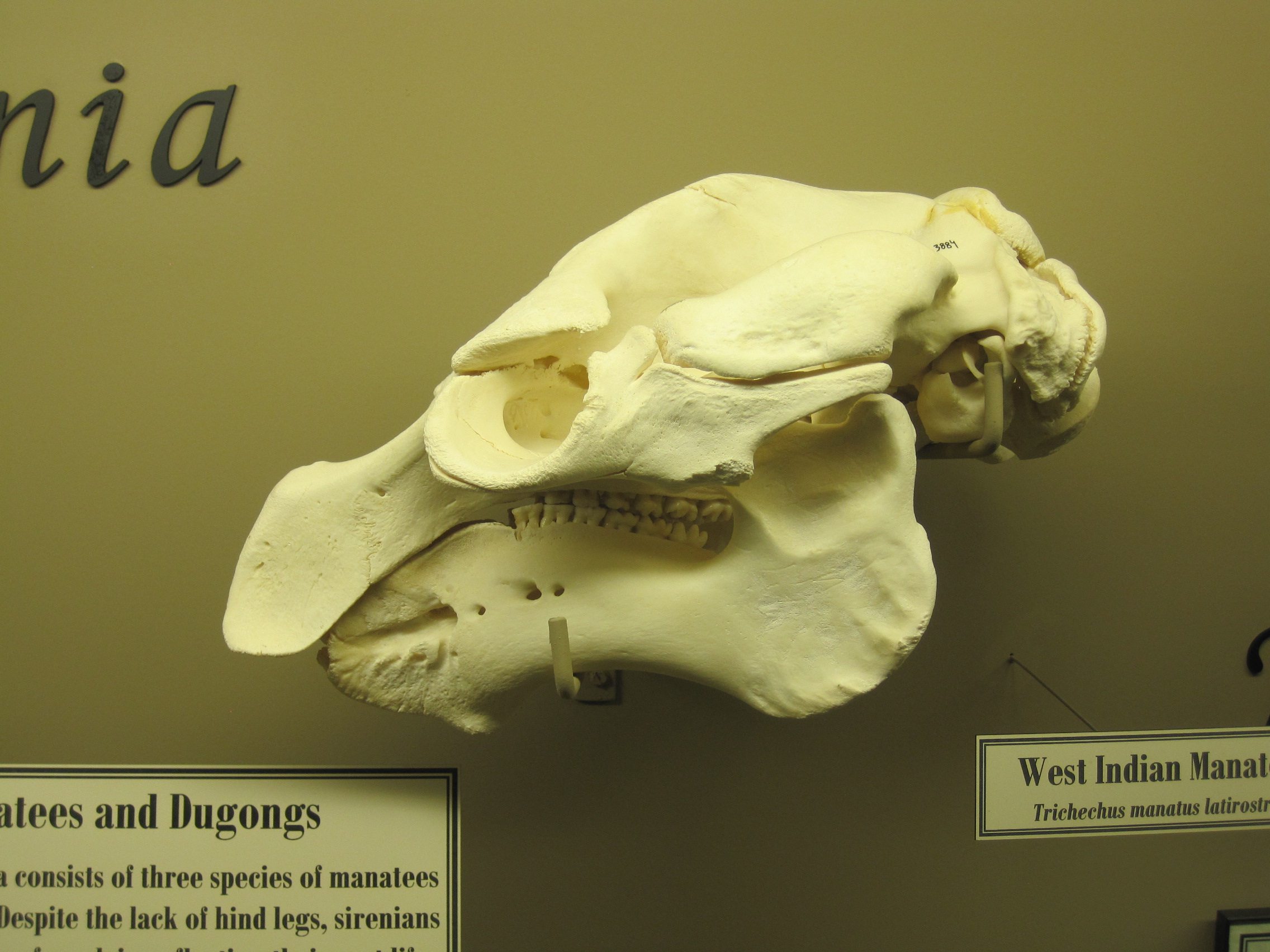
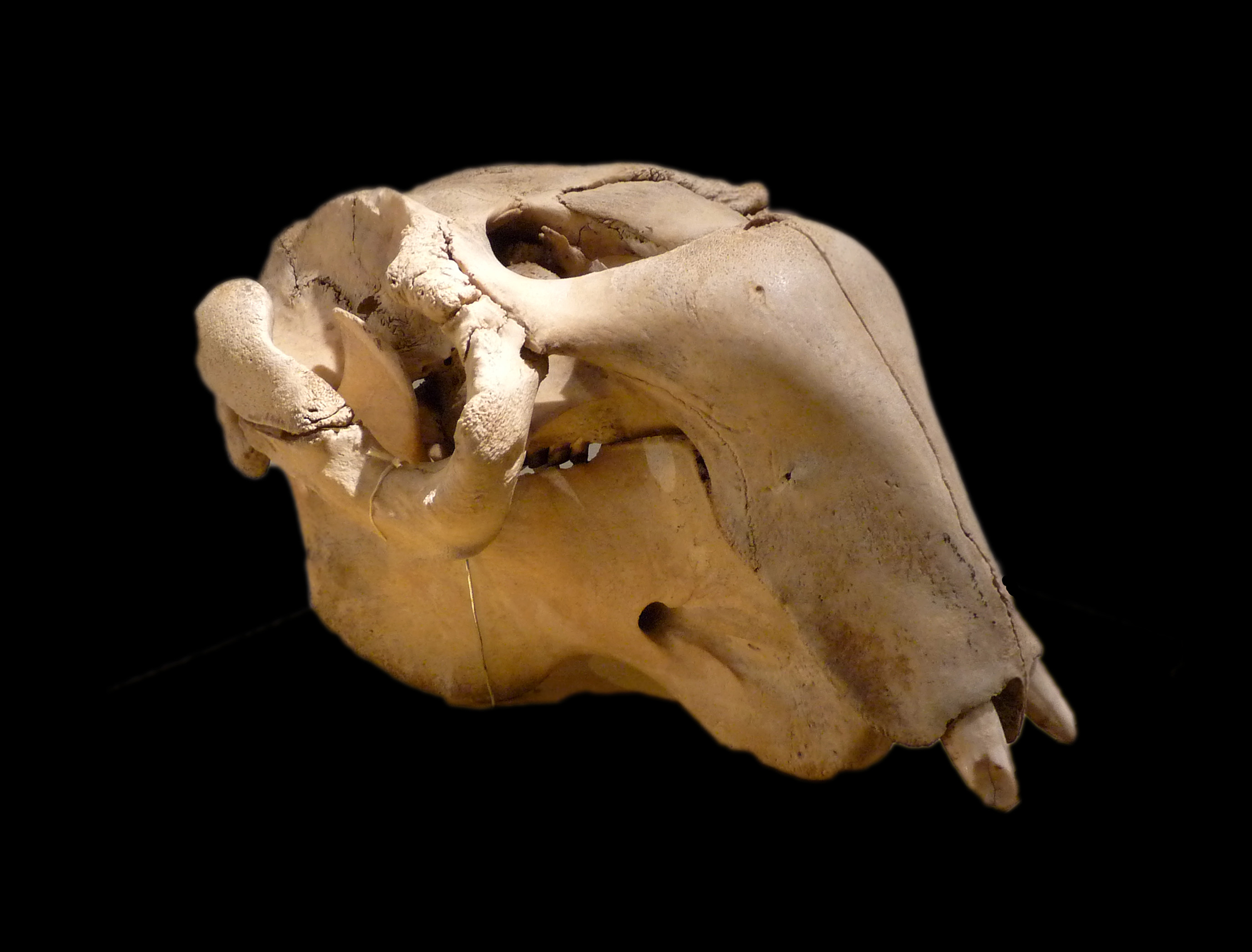
A manatee skull (left) vs. a dugong skull (right)

Much like elephants, manatees are polyphyodonts, continuously replacing their teeth from the back of the jaw. Adults lack incisors, canines, and premolars, and instead have eight to ten cheek teeth. Manatees have an unlimited supply of teeth moving in from the back and shedding in the front; these are continuously formed by a dental capsule behind the tooth row. These teeth are constantly worn down by the abrasive vascular plants they forage, particularly aquatic grasses. Unlike those of manatees, the dugong's teeth do not continually grow back via horizontal tooth replacement. The dugong has two tusks which emerge in males during puberty, and sometime later in life for females after reaching the base of the premaxilla. The number of growth layer groups in a tusk indicates the age of a dugong.

Sirenians exhibit pachyostosis, a condition in which the ribs and other long bones are solid and contain little or no bone marrow. They have among the densest bones in the animal kingdom. These may act as ballast, countering the buoyancy of their blubber and helping them remain suspended slightly below the water's surface. Manatees do not possess blubber per se, but rather have thick skin and consequently are sensitive to temperature changes. They often migrate to warmer waters whenever the water temperature dips below 20 °C (68 °F). The lungs of sirenians are unlobed; along with the diaphragm, these extend the entire length of the vertebral column, helping the animals control their buoyancy and reducing tipping in the water.

Extant sirenians grow to between 2.5 and 4 metres (8.2 and 13.1 ft) in length and can weigh up to 1,500 kilograms (3,300 lb). Steller's sea cow was the largest known sirenian to have lived, and could reach lengths of 9 metres (30 ft) and weight of 8 to 10 tonnes (8.8 to 11.0 short tons). A dugong's brain weighs a maximum of 300 grams (11 ounces), about 0.1% of the animal's body weight. The bodies of sirenians are sparsely covered in short hair (vibrissae), except that it becomes denser on the muzzle, which may allow for tactile interpretation of their environment. Manatees are the only known organism with uniformly vascularized corneas. This may be the result of irritation from or protection against their hypotonic freshwater environment.

=== Diet ===
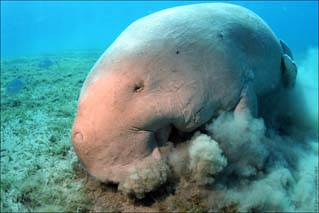
Dugongs sift through the seafloor in search of seagrasses.

Sirenians are referred to as "sea cows" because their diet consists mainly of seagrass. Dugongs sift through the seafloor in search of seagrasses, using their sense of smell because their eyesight is poor. They ingest the whole plant, including the roots, although they will feed on just the leaves if this is not possible. Using its divided upper lip, the West Indian manatee is known to consume over 60 different freshwater and saltwater plants, such as shoalweed, water lettuce, muskgrass, manatee grass, and turtle grass. An adult manatee will commonly eat up to 10–15% of its body weight, or 50 kilograms (110 lb), per day, which requires the manatee to graze for several hours per day. By contrast, 10% of the diet of the African manatee is fish and mollusks. Manatees have been known to eat small amounts of fish from nets.

As opposed to bulk feeding, dugongs target high-nitrogen grasses to maximize nutrient intake, and, although predominantly herbivorous, dugongs will occasionally eat invertebrates such as jellyfish, sea squirts, and shellfish. Some populations of dugongs, such as the one in Moreton Bay, Australia, are omnivorous, feeding on invertebrates such as polychaetes or marine algae when their supply of seagrasses is low. In other dugong populations in western and eastern Australia, there is evidence that dugongs actively seek out large invertebrates.

Populations of Amazonian manatees become restricted to lakes during the July–August dry season when water levels begin to fall, and are thought to fast during this period. Their large fat reserves and low metabolic rates—only 36% of the usual placental mammal metabolic rate—allow them to survive for up to seven months with little or no food.

=== Feeding behavior ===
==== Important anatomy in feeding ====
Perioral bristles are not only used to sense things, but can be used to grasp and manipulate food. Of the six distinct fields of bristles on upper and lower lips, the perioral fields have distinct length-to-diameter ratios, defining their boundaries. Macrovibrissae are used to detect food by its size and microvibrissae to manipulate food. They can be used to break off leaves and undesirable parts while feeding. Sirenians use their elaborate facial musculature along with perioral bristles to acquire, manipulate, and ingest aquatic vegetation. The snout makes up a muscular hydrostat, a biological structure that relies on muscular pressure and muscle contractions to manipulate and move food. The manatee uses its large upper perioral bristles to carry out a grasping motion: it performs a flare that tightens the muscular hydrostat while the large upper bristles get pushed out and the lower jaw drops and sweeps the vegetation in by closing. The primary bristles used for vegetation ingestion are the U2 and L1 fields. Dugongs and trichechids differ in how they use the U1 and U2 bristle fields during feeding. Dugongs use a medial-to-lateral motion for U2 bristles, while trichechids use a prehensile, lateral-to-medial grasping motion. These divergent feeding behaviors allow dugongs to exploit benthic foraging, including rhizome consumption, more effectively than trichechids.

==== Food handling ====
Food handling was measured by observing the length of cyclic movements (feeding cycles) of the manatees' perioral bristles used to introduce food into their mouths. Mean feeding cycle lengths varied based on the manatees' body size and the species of plant being consumed. Rates of food introduction, derived from mean feeding cycle lengths, were comparable to chewing rates reported in other studies. Manatees consumed plants with tubular stems and numerous branches more quickly than plants with flat blades. Food handling time using perioral bristles differed depending on the species of plants consumed, as reflected in the mean feeding cycle length. Thus, Florida manatees adapt their feeding behavior depending on the characteristics of the plants they consume. They exhibit different food handling strategies and efficiencies based on the plant species, with faster consumption observed for plants with tubular stems and numerous branches. This research provides valuable insights into the feeding ecology.

==== Cultivation grazing ====
Dugongs are constrained in their feeding by their rudimentary dentition and limited nitrogen abundance in seagrasses. To counter this, they use a strategy called "cultivation grazing". This grazing can alter the composition of seagrass communities and favor species. Early and rapidly growing species will succeed over slow-growing species. Oftentimes, these "pioneer" species can be high in nitrogen and low in fibre, making them a preferred diet for the dugongs. To ensure the abundance of favored seagrasses, dugongs exhibit sustained grazing pressure on seagrass patches up to a month or more. The grazing maximizes the presence of species preferred by the dugongs at the expense of less nutritious and less favored species. This grazing method also encourages rapid recovery of seagrass meadows- the dugongs graze in meandering, single trails that leave uncropped patches of seagrass. This ungrazed reserve with their surviving rhizomes are key to the expansion and restoration of seagrasses. Seagrasses respond to cropping by increasing nitrogen levels and decreasing lignin. Cultivation grazing allows dugongs to increase both nutritionally superior seagrasses, but the overall nutritional quality of the seagrasses. By maintaining the seagrasses in an immature state, dugongs ensure the highest level of nutrition.

=== Reproduction ===
Despite being mostly solitary, sirenians congregate in groups while females are in estrus. These groups usually include one female with multiple males. Sirenians are K-selectors; despite their longevity, females give birth only a few times during their lives and invest considerable parental care in their young. Dugongs generally gather in groups of less than a dozen individuals for one to two days. Since they congregate in turbid waters, little is known about their reproductive behavior. The males are often seen with scars, and the tusks on dugongs grow in first for males, suggesting they are important in lekking. They have also been known to lunge at each other. The age when a female first gives birth is disputed, ranging anywhere from six to seventeen years. The time between births is unclear, with estimates ranging from two to seven years. In Sarasota, Florida, 53 females under observation produced at least 55 calves during a five-year period.

Manatees can reach sexual maturity as early as two to five years of age. Manatee gestation is around one year, and then they lactate for one to two years. West Indian manatees and African manatees can breed year-round, and a female will mate with multiple males. Amazonian manatees have a breeding season, usually mating when the river levels begin to rise, which varies from place to place.

== Manatees in captivity ==
Manatees may be taken into captivity after being found stranded to facilitate their recovery, and there are many instances of manatees being successfully rehabilitated and released into the wild. As all extant sirenian species are rated as Vulnerable, these rehabilitation programs present a useful means to support these species. However, the vulnerability of these animals also means that the taking of manatees from the wild for commercial purposes is a conservation issue.

=== Diet in captivity ===
Manatees tend to do well in a captive environment and have been known to thrive. However, it can be difficult to replicate the conditions of their natural environment to the extent necessary to maintain a manatee at its healthiest; the typical diet fed to captive manatee populations may contain insufficient quantities of the nutrients they need.

Manatee captive-fed diets vary greatly from the manatee's diet in the wild. In captivity, manatees are fed 70–80% leafy green vegetables, 10–20% dried forage, and 5% vegetables and fruits. Dried forage is foods such as hay and timothy grass, which are often used as horse and cattle feed. The vegetables and fruits that are fed to manatees include romaine lettuce, carrots, and apples. In their natural habitat, approximately half of the manatee's diet is marine or estuarine plants. When compared to the captive diet, aquatic plants have more dry matter and soluble neutral detergent fiber, and less digestible nutrients. Although more easily digestible nutrients may seem to represent a better diet, a manatee's gastrointestinal tract is adapted to the wild diet through microbial processes of fermentation.

Rescue and rehabilitation efforts often involve orphaned infant manatees. In captivity, young manatees will be bottle-fed an amino acid-based milk formula that includes a protein source, oils, and a stabilizing agent. This concoction is supplemented with vitamins. During intake, young manatees might require electrolytes via intravenous hydration or even tube feeding if they continuously reject the bottle. After six months, they will be introduced to solid foods like romaine and iceberg lettuce, pumpkin, and root vegetables. After a year and a half, the weaning process will begin and the juvenile manatees will be offered less and less milk during feeding times, slowly transitioning to a completely solid food diet.

== Threats and conservation ==
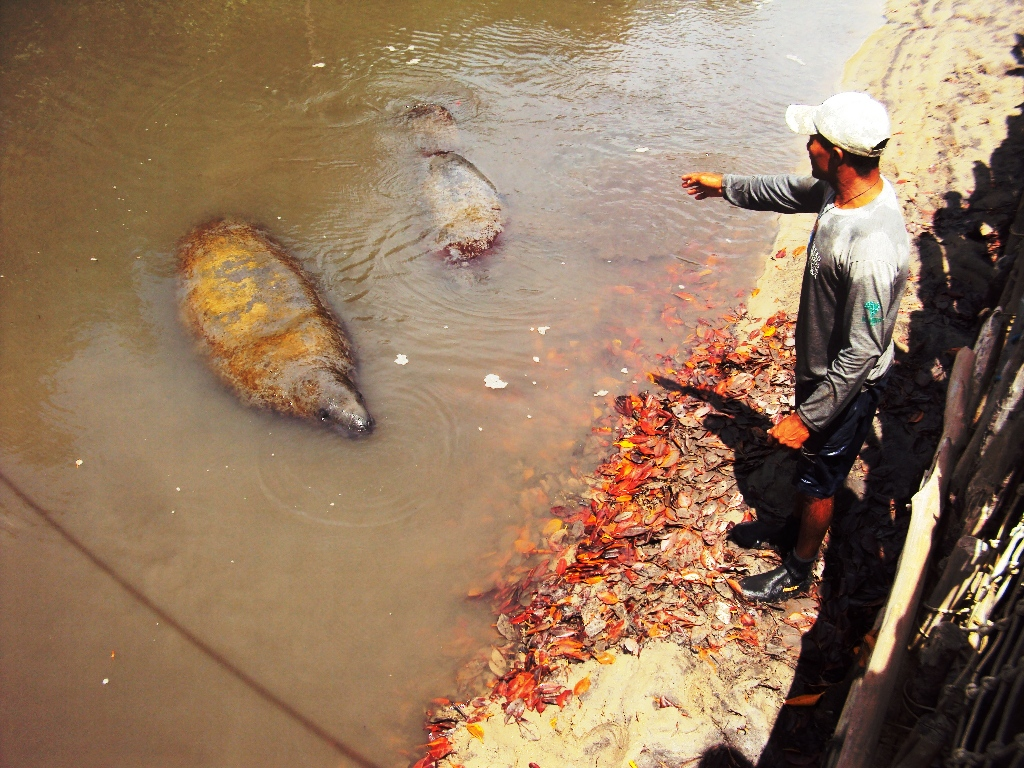
West Indian manatees in a conservation project in Brazil

The three extant manatee species (family Trichechidae) and the dugong (family Dugongidae) are rated as Vulnerable on the IUCN Red List of Threatened Species. All four are vulnerable to extinction from habitat loss and other negative impacts related to human population growth and coastal development. Steller's sea cow, extinct since 1768, was hunted to extinction by humans.

The meat, oil, bones, and skin of manatees have commercial value. In some countries, such as Nigeria and Cameroon, African manatees are sold to zoos, aquariums, and online as pets, sometimes being shipped internationally. Though hunting of them is illegal, lack of law enforcement in these areas allows poaching. Some residents of West African countries, such as Mali and Chad, believe that the oil of the African manatee can cure ailments such as ear infections, rheumatism, and skin conditions. Hunting is the largest source of mortality in Amazonian manatees, and there are no management plans except in Colombia. Amazonian manatees, especially calves, are sometimes illegally sold as pets, but there are several institutions that care for and rescue these orphans, with the possibility of releasing them into the wild. The body parts of dugongs are used as medicinal remedies across the Indian Ocean.

Manatees in Cuba have faced poaching, entanglement and pollution. The area has some of the most extensive and best manatee habitat in the Caribbean, but the population has been unable to thrive there. Existing information about manatees in Cuba is limited; this makes it difficult to spread awareness, which therefore enhances the risks of poaching and entanglement in fishing nets in coastal communities. Poaching of the manatees has been a significant issue since the 1970s, when it was initially reported that the hunting was taking its toll on the manatee population in Cuba. In 1975, it was reported that the manatees' population in Cuba was rare and declining at an alarming rate due to pollution and hunting. In 1996, manatees were placed under protection through Fishery Decree Law 164. This law provided penalties against those who manipulate, harm, or injure manatees. The hunting of manatees in Cuba in the 1990s may have been the result of economic hardship, with the manatees being seen as a source of protein. Although there have been efforts made to protect the population of manatees in Cuba, it has not proven to be effective as those working to protect the population had hoped. Many of these areas are seen as parks that exist only on paper, and they do not have a significant impact on conversation and protection.

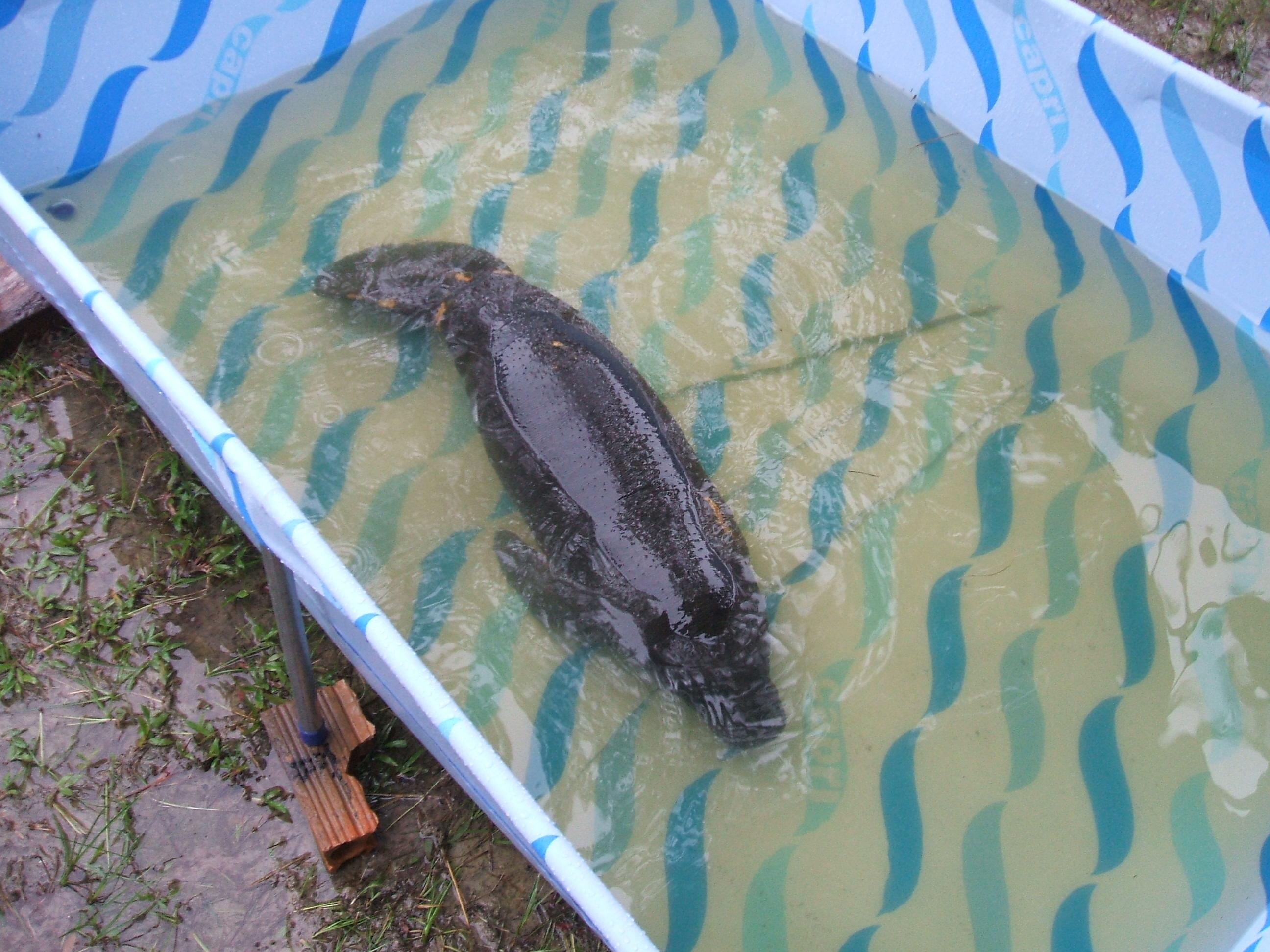
Rehabilitation of an Amazonian manatee calf by the Brazilian Institute of Environment and Renewable Natural Resources (IBAMA)

Environmental hazards induced by humans also puts sirenians at risk. Sirenians, especially the West Indian manatee, face high mortality from watercraft collision, and about half of all West Indian manatee deaths are caused by watercraft collisions. An increased use of hydroelectric power and consequent damming of rivers increase waterway traffic, which can lead to vessel collisions, and manatees may become entrapped in navigational locks. The urbanization of the coastline of areas such as the Caribbean, Florida, and Australia can result in a decline in seagrass populations. Seagrass meadows are also highly susceptible to pollution, and are currently among the top threatened ecosystems on Earth. Reliable areas of warm water in Florida are generally the result of discharge from power plants, but newer plants with more efficient cooling systems may disrupt the pattern of warm water refuges, and an increased demand on artesian springs, the animals' natural source of warm water, for human use decreases the number of warm water refuges. Congregating in the warm waters of industrial areas of Florida can expose manatees to pollutants and toxins at a time of year when their immune systems are already compromised.

Sirenians can be caught as bycatch from fisheries, and they can be seen as pests that interfere with local fishermen and damage their nets. African manatees have also been known to venture into rice paddies and destroy the crops during the rainy season, and these confrontations with locals may lead to intentional killing of the manatees.

Red tide, a harmful algae bloom of Karenia brevis that releases toxins into the water, kills many marine species. In 1982, many manatees were sickened by consuming brevetoxins that had accumulated in filter-feeding organisms attached to seagrass blades. Manatees can also inhale these brevotoxins from the surface of the water as they come up for air, leading to respiratory symptoms and even drowning. Manatee die-offs from exposure to red tide toxins were recorded by the Florida Fish and Wildlife Conservation Commission in southwest Florida in 2002, 2003, 2005, 2007, and 2013. A 2018 red tide bloom spread from Pasco County to Collier County off the west coast of Florida. As of January 2018, there were a total of 472 manatee deaths caused by this red tide, along with watercraft, cold stress, and other factors.

Manatees have been negatively impacted by plastics and other debris that makes its way into the ocean and other waterways. Plastic and debris can result in manatee entanglement, ingestion, amputation or even death. When a manatee ingests plastic, it is often not known until after death, when a necropsy is conducted and debris is found in the manatee's GI tract. Of the 40 Antillean manatees that were rescued, rehabilitated, and released by the Clearwater Marine Aquarium Manatee Reintroduction Program along the Central and South American coast, four were found to have plastic in their GI tract. Treatment was completed and the manatees were released. Later, three of the four were found dead, two as a direct result of plastic ingestion and the third with plastic pieces in its GI tract. Items found in the deceased manatees' GI tracts included condoms, plastic bags, Raschel knit polyester, unknown plastic debris, and ice cream and sanitary product wrappers.

A study at the University of Miami in Florida assessed 439 manatee carcasses that were recovered and necropsied between 1978 and 1986. Of these, 63 (14.4%) had ingested debris; four of the animals died as a direct result of ingestion of plastic or other debris. Some of the debris that was found in the animals' GI tracts included monofilament fishing line (the most common item found), plastic bags, string, twine, rope, fishhooks, wire, paper, cellophane, synthetic sponges, rubber bands and stockings.

Infectious diseases may also play an important role in morbidity and mortality. Although viruses have been identified only from Florida manatees, parasites and bacteria have been observed in at least three of the four sirenian species. The viruses that have been detected in Florida manatees include trichechid herpesvirus 1 (TrHV-1) and manatee papillomaviruses (TmPV) 1 through 4. Mycobacteriosis has reportedly led to mortality in captive Florida manatees and illness in Amazonian manatees while bacteria such as Vibrio, Pasteurella, Pseudomonas, Streptococcus, and Clostridium have been cultured from dead dugongs in Australia. Salmonellosis has been associated with mortality in dugongs since at least 1981. Although not well studied, the Senegal manatee is known to host the nematode Heterocheilus tunicatus, just as its sister species the West Indian manatee does. There is still a great deal to learn about the threat that infectious diseases pose to both wild and captive populations of manatees. The relationship between the presence of certain potential pathogens, including those listed above, and their effect on disease in individuals is still largely unknown, although many wild manatees are found to be positive for papillomavirus with no known negative health effects. Immunosuppressed individuals that test positive for papillomavirus can sometimes develop cutaneous lesions; however, cutaneous papillomatosis is not always correlated with a papillomavirus infection, and further study is warranted.

In Florida, agricultural runoff can negatively affect the manatee habitat, and during the rainy season, over 50 counties practice fertilizer bans to try to limit the pollutants that end up in waterways. Weather disasters and other natural occurrences are also sources of mortality. The West Indian manatee and dugong face risks from hurricanes and cyclones, which are predicted to increase in the future. These storms can spread pollutants and may damage seagrass populations. African manatees can become stranded during the dry season when rivers and lakes become too small or dry up completely.

Climate change is a growing concern for manatees, as changes in temperature can affect sea levels, pH, precipitation, salinity, and the circulation patterns of coastal ecosystems. Climate change is also predicted to make winter months even colder, leading to increased instances of cold stress in manatees. Manatees are known to have an incredibly low metabolic rate and poor insulation, therefore, it is harder for them to thermoregulate in cold water conditions. They typically will migrate to warmer waters once water temperatures start to drop below 20 degrees Celsius. This can include naturally warmer waters or artificial warm water habitats produced by power plants/energy center outfalls. Manatee cold stress syndrome can occur when there is prolonged exposure to water temperatures below the 20 degrees Celsius threshold, which can ultimately result in frostbite-like skin lesions, anorexia, fat atrophy, lymphoid depletion, and secondary infections and diseases. According to the Florida Fish and Wildlife Conservation Commission over the past three years, they have documented the highest number of cold-related deaths to date. This a common disease that is treated through the manatee rehabilitation facilities in the state of Florida like SeaWorld Orlando, Zoo Tampa at Lowry Park, Miami Seaquarium, and the Jacksonville Zoo and Gardens.

Manatee rehabilitation for diseases like cold stress syndrome is possible through the support of veterinary staff, zookeepers, researchers, and volunteers in the field. The number of manatees needing intervention is likely to rise as the number of warm water habitats decrease due to declining spring discharges and retirement of power plants. Common treatment therapies for manatee cold stress syndrome can include warm clean water, antibiotics, rehydration, enemas and mineral oil for constipation and foreign debris, and most importantly nutritional supplementation. For some manatee patients experiencing frostbite-like lesions, long-term supplementation may be recommended for optimal recovery. Those most affected by cold stress syndrome are those recently weaned, which can be trickier to treat because of concerns surrounding hypothermia.

Warming ocean temperatures can cause harmful algal blooms, which can choke out the light needed for growth of seagrass. Reduced seagrass beds means that more manatees end up congregating in smaller areas to feed, increasing competition for resources and the spread of pathogens. Exposure to brevetoxin during a red tide event is also a source of mortality; manatees may be exposed to brevetoxin after a red tide has subsided, as it can accumulate on seagrasses. The act of eating vegetation also stirs up sediment, resulting in the ingestion of contaminants trapped in the mud.

All sirenians are protected by the US Marine Mammal Protection Act of 1972, the US Endangered Species Act of 1973, and the Convention on the International Trade in Endangered Species of Wild Fauna and Flora (CITES). In addition to this, the four species are further protected by various specialty organizations. The dugong is listed in the Convention on Biological Diversity, the Convention on Migratory Species, and the Coral Triangle Initiative. In Florida, manatees are protected by the Florida Manatee Sanctuary Act of 1978, which implements actions such as the prohibition of watercraft or limits on their speeds where manatees exist. Marine mammal rehabilitation programs have been underway and regulated in the United States for more than 40 years. In 1973, injured and distressed manatees were rescued or aided in Florida. Eventually, the program was formalized into the Manatee Rescue, Rehabilitation, and Release Program managed by the US Fish and Wildlife Service. In 2012, the program became the Manatee Rescue & Rehabilitation Partnership, with permitting and oversight by the USFWS. From 1973 through 2014, this program rescued 1,619 manatees and released 526.

== See also ==
- Dwarf manatee
- Cetacea
- Marine mammal
