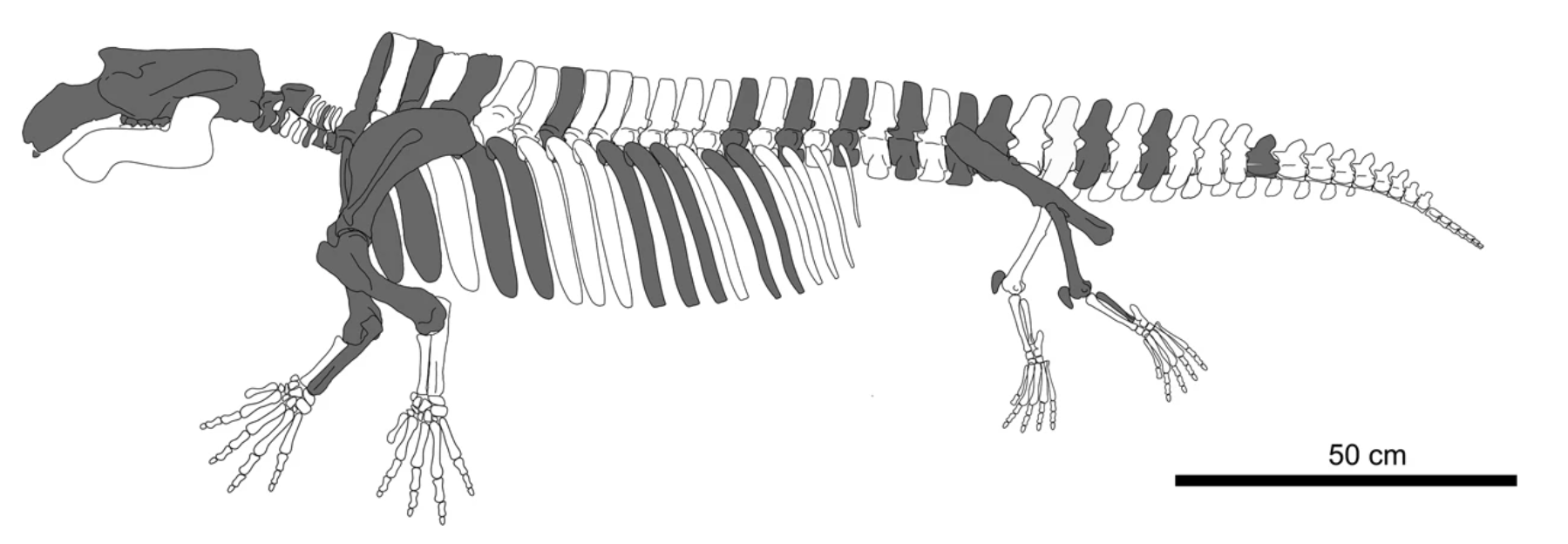
- Skeletal reconstruction of Sobrarbesiren, showing known elements in grey

Scientific classification
- Domain: Eukaryota
- Kingdom: Animalia
- Phylum: Chordata
- Class: Mammalia
- Order: Sirenia
- Family: incertae sedis
- Genus: †Sobrarbesiren
- Species: †S. cardieli

Binomial name
- †Sobrarbesiren cardieli Díaz-Berenguer, 2018

= Sobrarbesiren =

Sobrarbesiren Temporal range: Lutetian

Extinct sirenian

Sobrarbesiren (meaning "siren from Sobrarbe") is a genus of extinct sirenian that lived in the Eocene, about 47 million years ago. The type and only species is S. cardieli, known from a multitude of specimens from the Spanish Pyrenees. Sobrarbesiren was a medium-sized animal, 2.7 m (8 ft 10 in) long and still retaining both pairs of limbs. Although initially thought to be amphibious, later studies instead suggest that they would have been fully aquatic and been selective sea grass browsers. Unlike modern dugongs and manatees, they likely lacked a tail fluke, although it would have appeared horizontally flattened.

== Discovery and naming ==
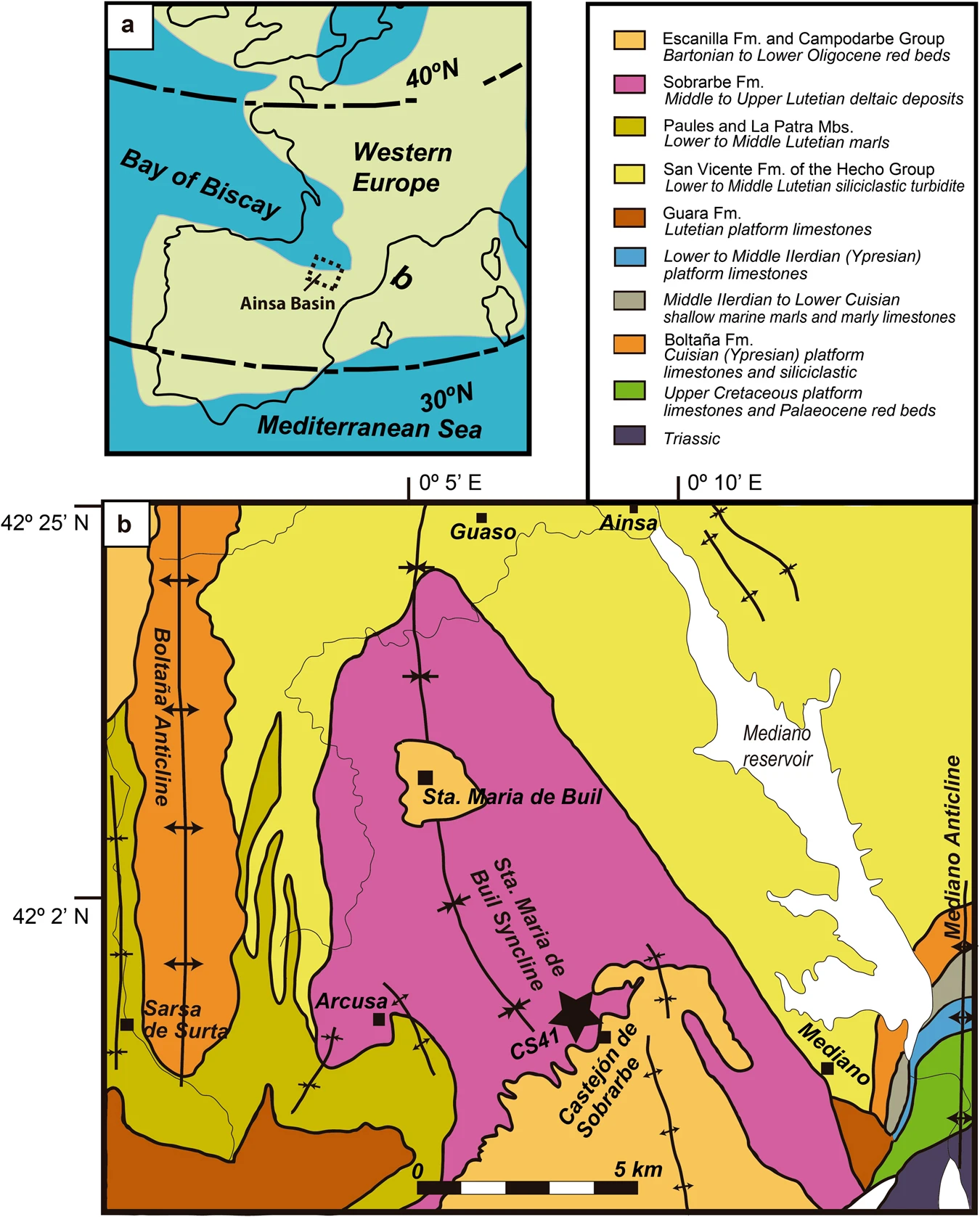

Sobrarbesiren was discovered in the Castejón de Sobrarbe-41 locality (Sobrarbe Formation) in the Spanish Pyrenees, specifically the Huesca province. The locality dates to the Lutetian stage of the Eocene and preserved 300 individual siren fossils thought to belong to at least six individuals of different growth stages. The holotype specimen is complete skull of a juvenile animal housed at the Museo de Ciencias Naturales de la Universidad de Zaragoza. Later discoveries recovered several additional specimens, including remains of young adults. Sobrarbesiren represents the first record of sirenians in western Europe as well as the first and only well preserved instance of a quadrupedal siren on the continent. Prior to its discovery, only more derived members of Dugongidae have been known from adequate remains, while any more basal fossils were only present in the form of fragments.

The name Sobrarbesiren derives from the type locality, while the species name is a patronym, styled after Jesús Cardiel Lalueza who first discovered the site.

== Description ==
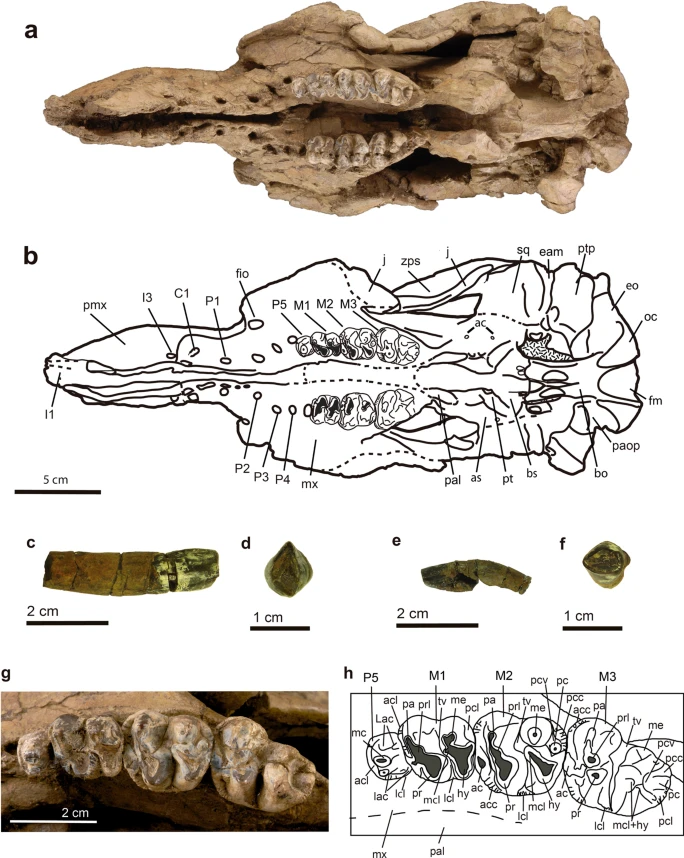
Skull of Sobrarbesiren in ventral view

Sobrarbesiren was a medium-sized sirenian that retained all four limbs in a well developed state, unlike later sirenians that would eventually lose their hindlimbs entirely. Estimates suggest that it reached a length of 2.7 m (8 ft 10 in).

The rostrum shows a significant downturn of 32°, which is notably more deflected than in prorastomids, but far from as developed as the deflection in later sirenians. The symphysis of the premaxilla is high but laterally flattened with a tapering nasal process that contacts the maxilla, nasal bone and frontal bone, as in other sirenians. The nares are enlarged and retracted and overhung by a triangular process formed by both nasal bones. The posterior end of the nasal bones is rounded with a small incursion of the frontal bone, which otherwise wraps around the nasals on either side. The lacrimal bones are only partially preserved and entirely surrounded by the maxilla and frontal, however in spite of the preservation a small foramina can be observed. The frontal shows no bosses and the parietal does not form a proper sagittal crest, instead possessing a temporal crest formed by the parietal bones that fuse just before the coronal suture. The back of the head is marked by three foramina arranged in a triangular pattern just before the nuchal crest. Like in other basal sirenians, Sobrarbesiren possesses an alisphenoid canal.

The upper jaw of Sobrarbesiren preserved two incisors, the first and the third, showing no signs of the second incisor whatsoever. Like in later dugongids, the first incisor forms a tusk at the anterior end of the premaxilla, while the third incisor of Sobrarbesiren is situated much further back, just before the suture between premaxilla and maxilla. The following canines and premolars were not preserved in situ, but the alveoli they would have fit into show that they only had a single root. However the fifth and final premolar is still present in the holotype skull. Although still relatively small compared to the molars that follow it, the presence of a permanent premolar is considered to be a plesiomorphic state in sirenians. The premolar shows a single central cusp surrounded by much lower outer (labial) and inner (lingual) cuspules. An anterior cingulum with its own cuspules is also present. The molars are significantly larger than the fifth premolar, longer than wide (especially prominent in the last two teeth), bilophodont and three-rooted. Of the molars lophs the protoloph is more developed thanks to the higher trigon. The lophs of each tooth are separated by a valley that opens outwards but is closed off towards the inside of the mouth.

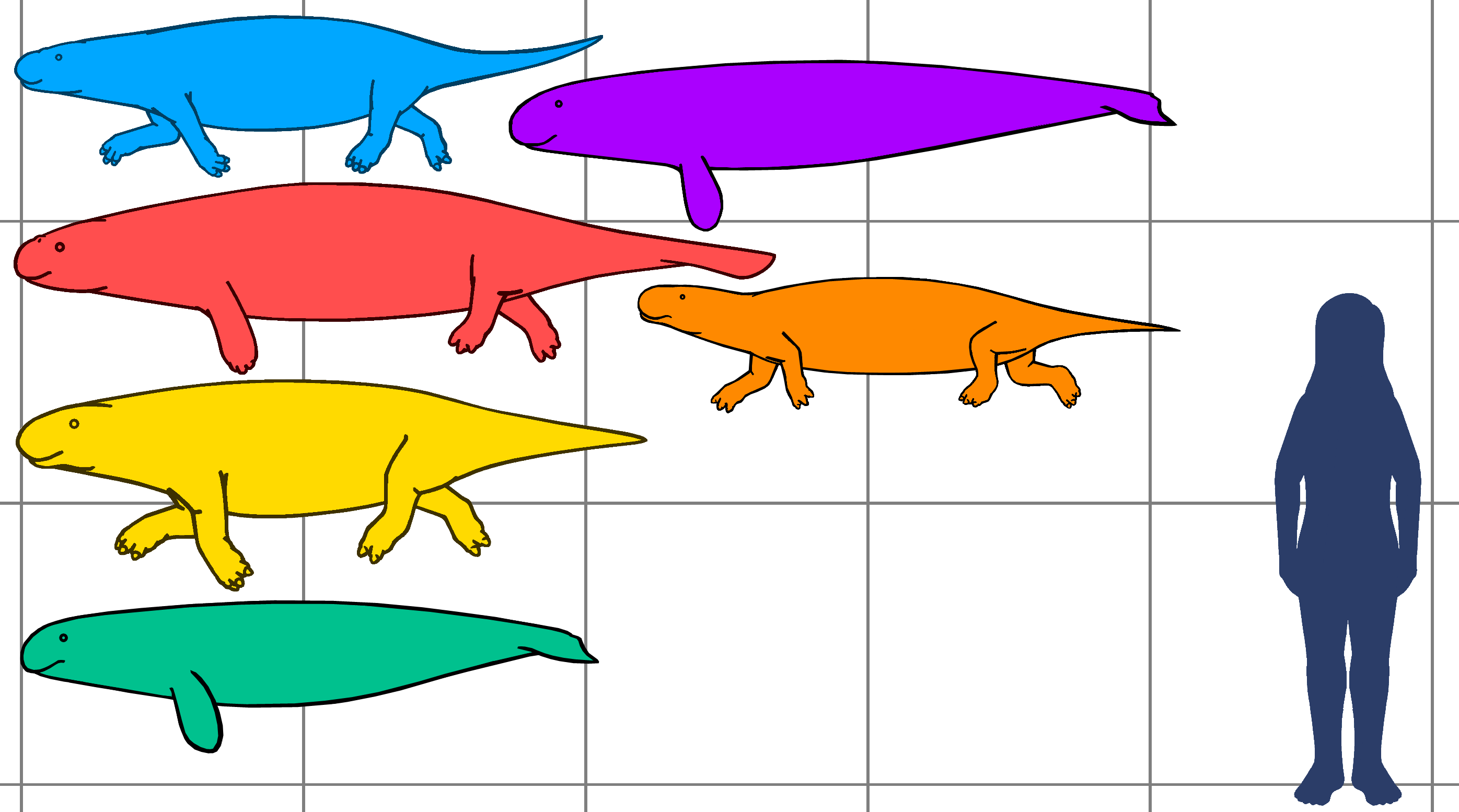
Eocene sirenians size comparison, Sobrarbesiren in yellow

The vertebral column is only incompletely known, but the preserved neural spines do not show the same horizontal projections of prorastomid sirenians, nor the split neural spine seen in protosirenids. The atlas is wide and relatively shallow, while the axis is robust with a swollen neural spine. The genus' neural canal is teardrop-shaped, a condition similar to derived sirenians, while the neural spines themselves are much higher than in dugongids, which indicates the presence of ligament that may have supported the head. The vertebrae of the sacram, of which there are at least two (compared to one in protosirenids and dugongids), are unfused with short transverse processes. The caudal vertebrae are not well enough preserved nor is that part of the skeleton complete enough to determine whether or not Sobrarbesiren had a tail fluke, however it was likely horizontally flattened. The ribs are thick and dense (pachyosteosclerotic) as well as flat and broad.

The scapula is stout and the humerus robust, while the ulna is straight and unfused to the absent radius (however this is likely connected to the age of the specimen). The pubis, ilium and ischium are fused to form an innominate bone which is long and narrow. The symphysis of the pubic elements of the innominate is long and rugose and the two pubes likely had a bony connection to one another. The sacroiliac joint between the sacrum and the ilium is bony and thus stronger than what is preserved for protosirenids. The socket for the femur is well developed and the femur itself resembles that of Pezosiren and protosirenids, however with a hemispherical head. Despite still being fully developed, the hindlimbs of Sobrarbesiren are already notably shorter than the forelimbs, with the ratio of femur length to humerus length being 1.42–1.5. However this number is uncertain, as the fossil humerus and femurs do not belong to specimens of the exact same age, rendering the exact ratio unknown.

== Phylogeny ==
Phylogenetic analysis conducted by Díaz-Berenguer and colleagues recovered Sobrarbesiren as a basal sirenian just outside of Dugongidae and more derived than prorastomids (which were found to be paraphyletic by them) and protosirenids. This they note to be strange, as Sobrarbesiren shows anatomy that is much better adapted to terrestrial locomotion than in what the authors found to be more basal taxa in their phylogeny.

- Sirenia
  - Prorastomus sirenoides
  - - Pezosiren portelli
    - - Protosirenidae
        - Ashokia antiqua
        - - Protosiren smithae
          - Protosiren fraasi
          - Libysiren sickenbergi
      - - Sobrarbesiren cardieli
        - Dugongidae
          - Eotheroides aegyptiacum
          - Prototherium ausetanum
          - Prototherium veronense
          - - - Prototherium intermedium
              - "Halitherium" taulannense
            - - - Eotheroides sandersi
                - Eotheroides clavigerium
              - - Trichechidae
                - - Kaupitherium gruelli
                  - - Priscosiren atlantica
                    - - Caribosiren turneri
                      - Metaxytherium albifontanum
                      - Hydrodamalinae
                      - Dugonginae

A later analysis made greater use of the neurocranial anatomy of Sobrarbesiren, both utilizing previously known specimens as well as newly discovered remains. Use of these features helped better resolve basal members of Sirenia. Under implied weighting, one of their analysis recovered Sobrarbesiren as a member of a new clade including Prototherium and Eotheroides, which nests in a position more basal than protosirenids, unlike in prior studies. However the authors hesitate to name the new clade, as they found poor support for this grouping, with another of their analyses instead finding the genus to nest in a large polytomy.

- Pan-Sirenia
  - Prorastomus sirenoides
  - - Pezosiren portelli
    - - - Sobrarbesiren cardieli
        - - Prototherium veronense
          - - Eotheroides aegyptiacum
            - Prototherium ausetanum
      - - Protosirenidae
          - Ashokia antiqua
          - - Protosiren smithae
            - - Protosiren fraasi
              - Libysiren sickenbergi
        - - Eotheroides lambondrano
          - - Eosiren imenti
            - Eosiren libyca
            - - - Eotheroides sandersi
                - Eotheroides clavigerium
              - - - Prototherium intermedium
                  - "Halitherium" taulannense
                - Sirenia
                  - Trichechidae
                  - Dugongidae
                    - - Kaupitherium gruelli
                      - Kaupitherium bronni
                    - - Lentiarenium cristolii
                      - - Priscosiren atlantica
                        - Caribosiren turneri
                        - - Hydrodamalinae
                          - Dugonginae

== Paleobiology ==
=== Locomotion ===
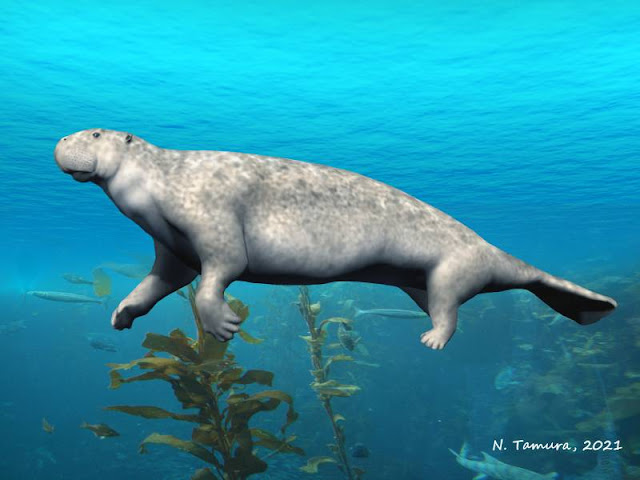
Although retaining all limbs, studies suggest that Sobrarbesiren wouldn't be able to walk on land

Several characteristics of Sobrarbesiren have initially been used to suggest that it was still capable of supporting its own weight on land and could have moved quadrupedally. The tall neural spines could have helped keep the head upright while the pubis and sacroiliac joints would have made quadrupedal locomotion possible. It was initially argued that this differentiated Sobrarbesiren from the protosirenids, which were likely incapable of supporting themselves and were restricted to movement more like that of modern pinnipeds. However despite these anatomical features, Sobrarbesiren was still clearly adapted to life in the water as shown by the anatomy of the sacral vertebrae, which differs from those of the more terrestrial Pezosiren. Taking into account all of its other adaptations to aquatic life (dense and broad ribs, retracted nares, short hindlimbs, unfused sacrum), Dìaz-Berenguer and colleagues initially hypothesize that Sobrarbesiren was an amphibious animal, living both on land and in the water. They further suggested that the animal likely fed in the water, but may have traveled between different bodies of water, which matches the environment it was found in being an intertidal floodplain.

However, a later paper by Díaz-Berenguer examined the hindlimbs and pelvis of Sobrarbesiren closer, comparing them to those of other basal sirenians, archaeocete whales and conducting microanatomical analysis on them. Their research concluded that the hips would have allowed for a wide variety of hindlimb movements while the sacral vertebrae allowed for lateral movement. The authors suggest that while swimming it could have moved by undulating its pelvis up and down while additionally paddling with its feet, similar to river otters. It is also possible that the hindlimbs of Sobrarbesiren complimented the flattened tail in its movement, as indicated by a torsion found on the femur. However, unlike the original description of the taxa, here the authors doubt that the animal would have been able to effectively move on land. They point towards the advanced osteosclerosis of the innominate and femur, which is much greater than what is seen in pinnipeds and more similar to what is known from protocetid whales. This could have rendered the bones too brittle to be used for terrestrial locomotion. They conclude that the internal changes of the bone would have preceded the external adaptations, explaining why they superficially appear sufficient for use out of water. Despite this, they note that the range of motion still suggests that the animal actively used its feet for swimming.

=== Diet and environment ===
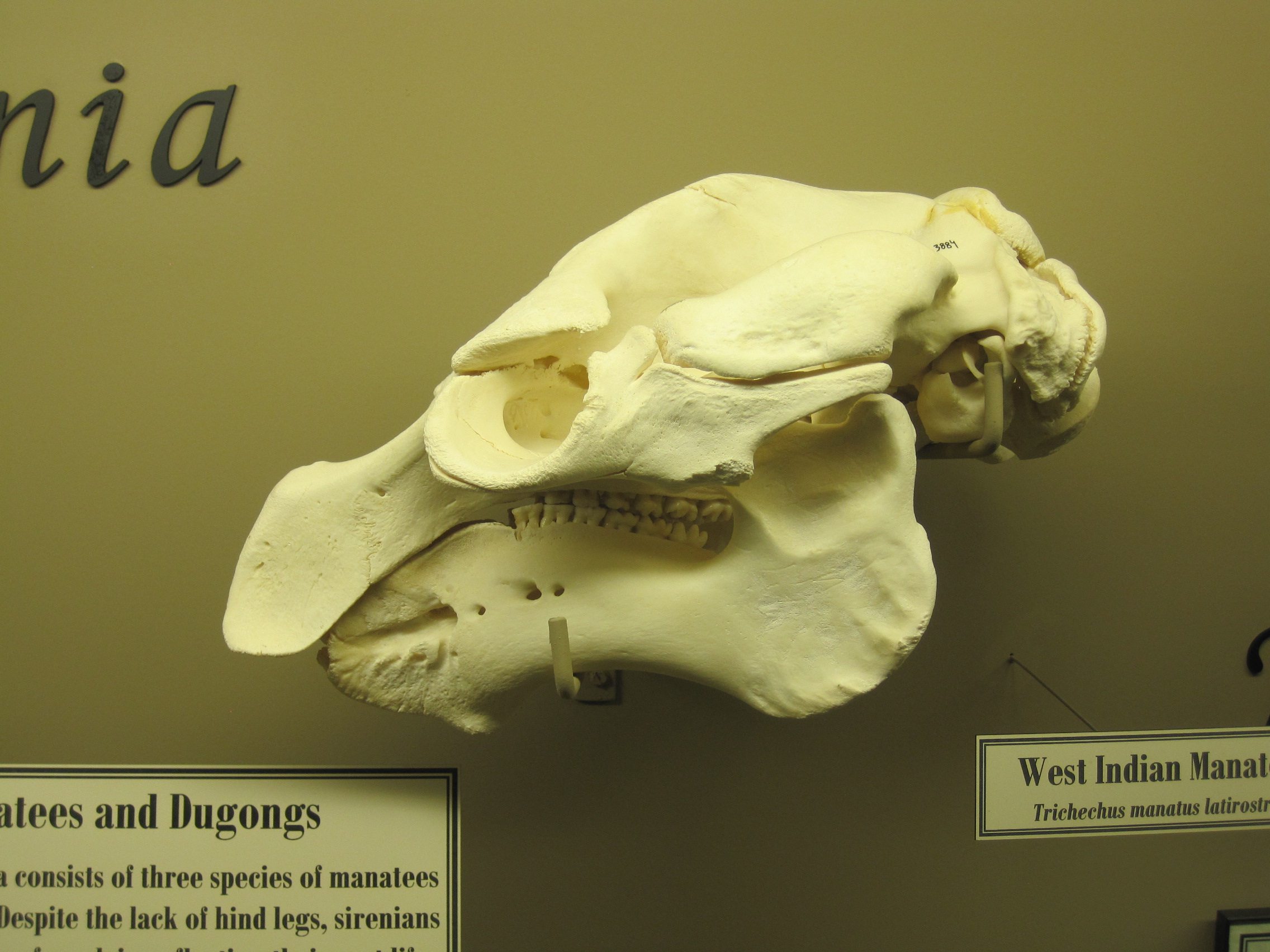
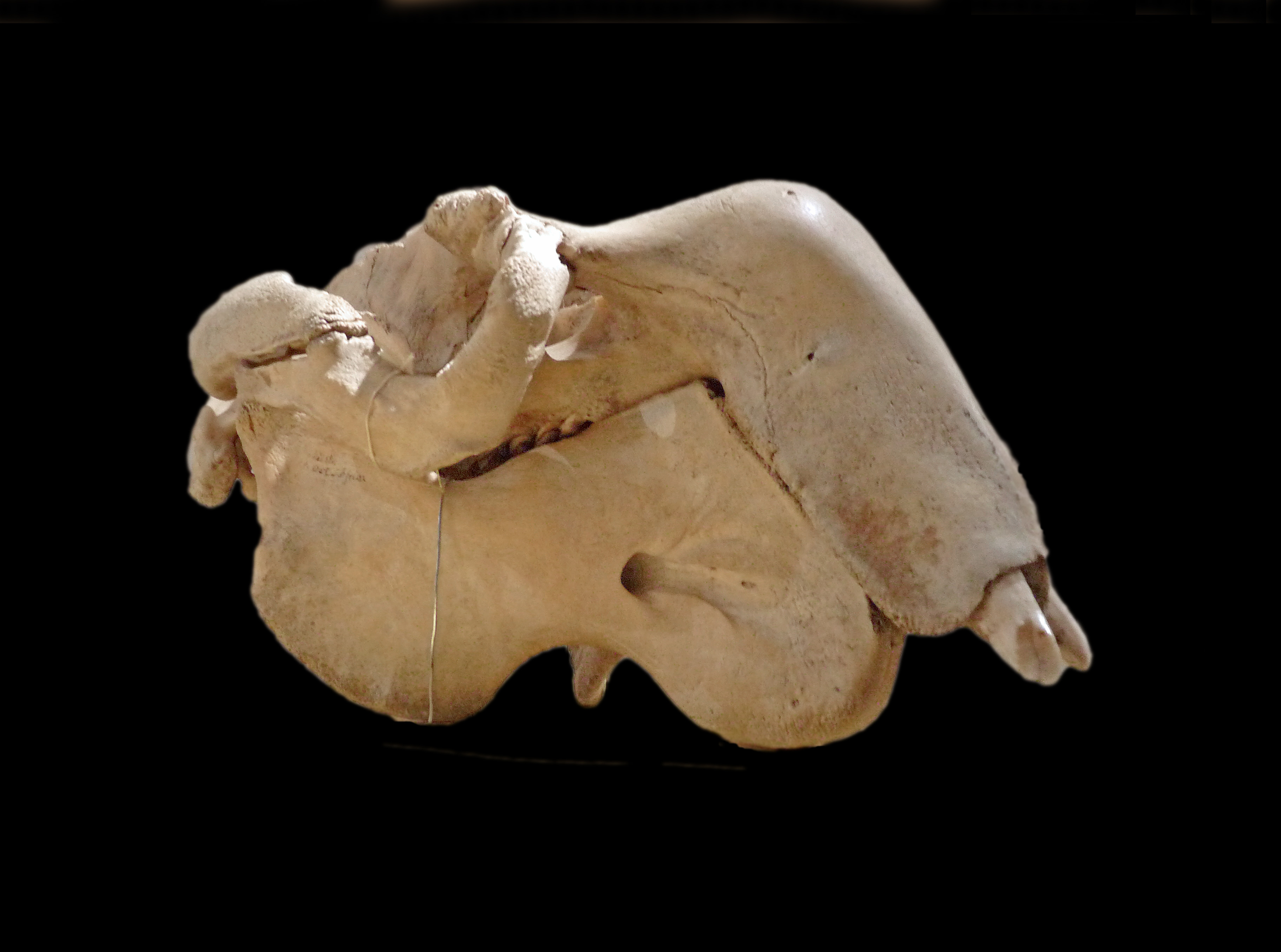
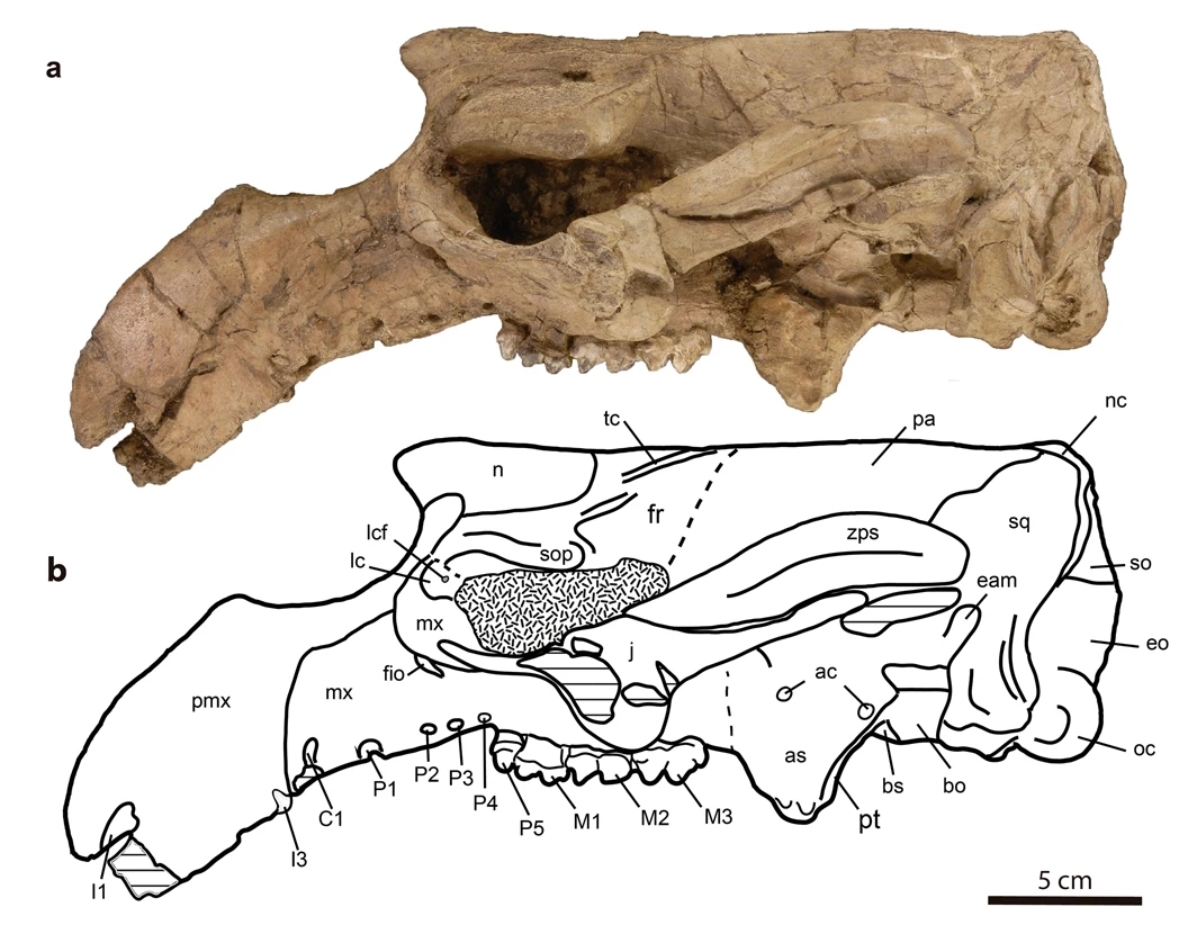
Skulls of a West Indian Manatee, Dugong and Sobrarbesiren in comparison, showing the varying degrees of rostral deflection

The degree to which the rostrums of sirenians deflect varies between genera and is generally connected to their diet. This is a particular adaptation to feeding on aquatic plants on the seafloor, with some of the most extreme cases displaying a downturn of up to 70°, like in the seagrass-specialized dugongs. The downturn of Sobrarbesiren is with 32° within the range of modern manatees, which range in deflection between 25 and 50°. Unlike the highly specialized dugongs, manatees have a broader diet feeding on plants growing in fresh and saltwater. Such a diet has previously been proposed for basal groups such as prorastomids, which are known coastal river deposits. This is however contrasted by isotope analysis, which suggests that even in these basal groups sea grass made up an important part of their diet. Additionally to the downturn of the rostrum, the width may also play a role in sirenian feeding habits. Domning proposes that narrow, laterally flattened mandibular symphysis and rostrum are indicative of selective feeding. While the mandible of Sobrarbesiren is unknown, the rostrum is compressed and would match this interpretation. Combining isotopic and morphological data, Sobrarbesiren is inferred to have been a selective browser primarily feeding on sea grass and occasionally on floating plant matter.

The Castejón de Sobrarbe-41 locality is thought to have been a channel within the tidal zone of the Bay of Biscay, a deep marine gulf located between the Iberian Peninsula and mainland Europe during the Eocene. The fact that the bones of Sobrarbesiren are well preserved but disarticulated and widely dispersed has been interpreted by Díaz-Berenguer and colleagues to mean that the channel containing the bones was filled by sediment in a single event, burying the bones instantly. Fossil foraminifera show that sea grasses could be found in the Ainsa Basin during the Eocene.
