= Megaherbivore =

Megafauna subgroup

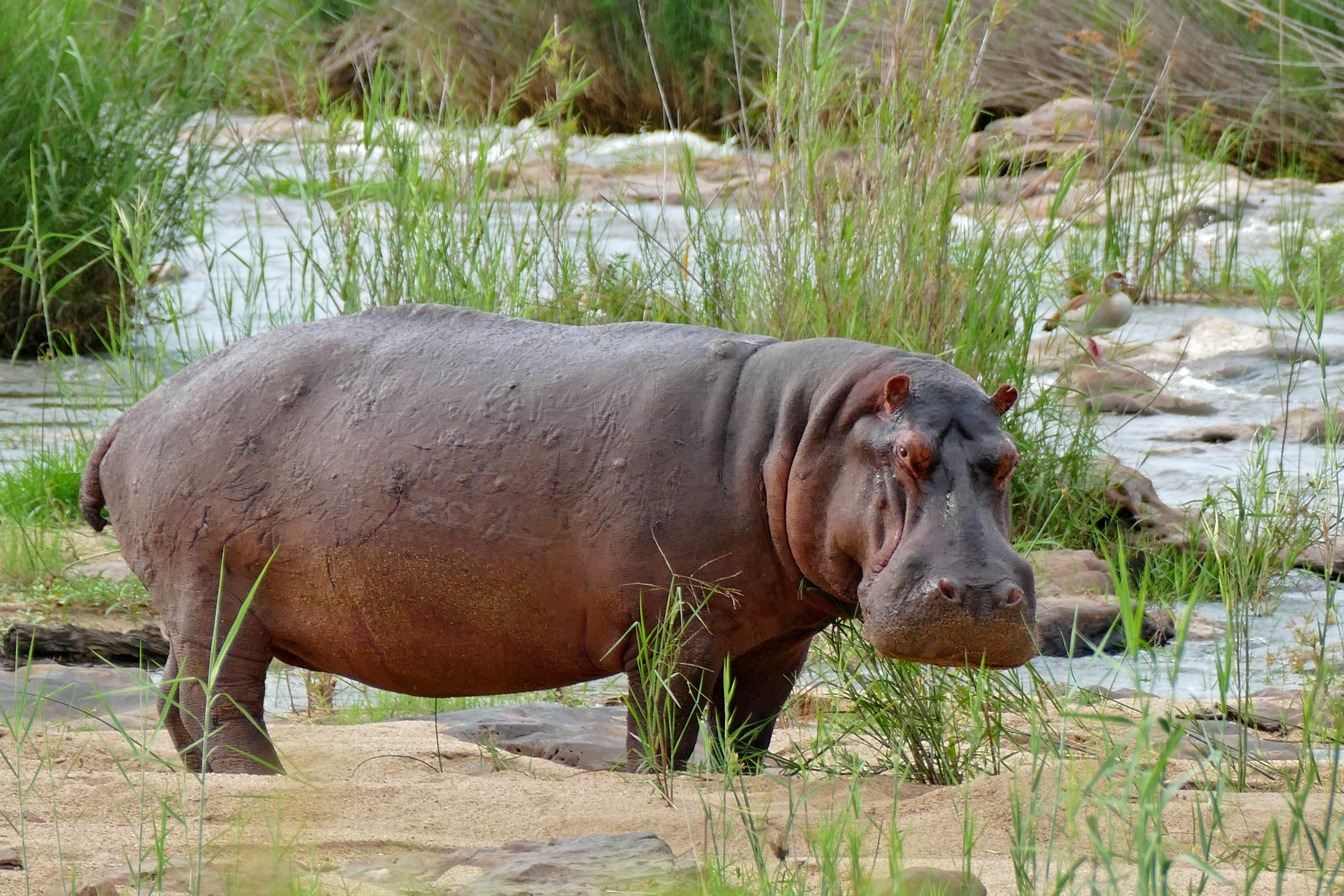
The common hippopotamus is an extant megaherbivore.

Megaherbivores (Greek μέγας megas "large" and Latin herbivora "herbivore") are large herbivores that exceed 1,000 kg (2,200 lb) in weight. The earliest herbivores to reach such sizes like the pareiasaurian reptiles and dinocephalian therapsids appeared in the Permian period. During most of the Mesozoic, the megaherbivore niche was largely dominated by dinosaurs up until their extinction during the Cretaceous–Paleogene extinction event. After this period, small mammalian species evolved into large herbivores in the Paleogene. As part of the Late Pleistocene megafauna extinctions, 80% of megaherbivore species became extinct, with complete extinctions occurring in Europe, Australia and the Americas. Current megaherbivores include twelve species of elephants, rhinos, hippos, and giraffes, living in Africa and Asia.

Extant megaherbivores are keystone species in their environment. They defoliate the landscape and spread a greater number of seeds than other frugivores. Like most large mammals, extant megaherbivores are K-selected species and are characterized by their large size, relative immunity to predation, their effect on plant species, and their dietary tolerance.

== Definition ==
Megaherbivores are large herbivores that weigh more than a ton when fully grown. They include mammalian herbivores, and are classified as the largest type of (herbivorous) terrestrial megafauna.

== Evolution ==
=== Permian ===
The Early Permian caseid synapsids have been described as among the first megaherbivores. Other major groups of Permian megaherbivores include dinocephalian therapsids (Middle Permian), and pareiasaurian reptiles (Middle-Late Permian). Megaherbivores became somewhat rare after the Permian–Triassic mass extinction event.

=== Triassic ===
Dicynodont therapsids were major megaherbivores for much of the Triassic period. Lisowicia was the last dicynodont that lived and became extinct in the Late Triassic, and is the largest known dicynodont and non mammalian synapsid, being comparable in size to an Asian elephant. Dinosaurs emerged as major megaherbivores during the later Triassic, cementing their dominance after the Triassic–Jurassic extinction event.

- Amniota
  - Synapsida
    - Dicynodontia (Permian, Triassic)
    - Mammals (small, until Paleogene)
  - Sauropsida
    - Pareiasauria (Permian)
    - Dinosauria (small, until Jurassic)

=== Jurassic ===
Sauropodomorphs became the largest megaherbivores in the Jurassic. Other megaherbivorous groups included stegosaurs and ankylosaurs.

=== Cretaceous ===
- Dinosauria
  - Saurischia
    - (carnivorous dinosaurs)
    - Sauropoda
  - Ornithischia
    - Thyreophora
      - Ankylosauria
        - Nodosauridae
        - Ankylosauridae
      - Stegosauria
        Stegosauridae
    - Neornithischia
      - Ceratopsidae
        - Centrosaurinae
        - Chasmosaurinae
      - Hadrosauridae
        Lambeosaurinae

From the Triassic to the Cretaceous, a diverse assemblage of megaherbivorous dinosaurs, such as sauropods, occupied different ecological niches. Based on their dentition, ankylosaurs may have mainly consumed succulent plants, as opposed to nodosaurs, which were mainly browsers. It is thought that ceratopsids fed on rugged vegetation, due to their jaw being designed for a crushing effect. Studies on hadrosaur dentition concluded that they primarily fed on fruits.

=== Paleogene ===
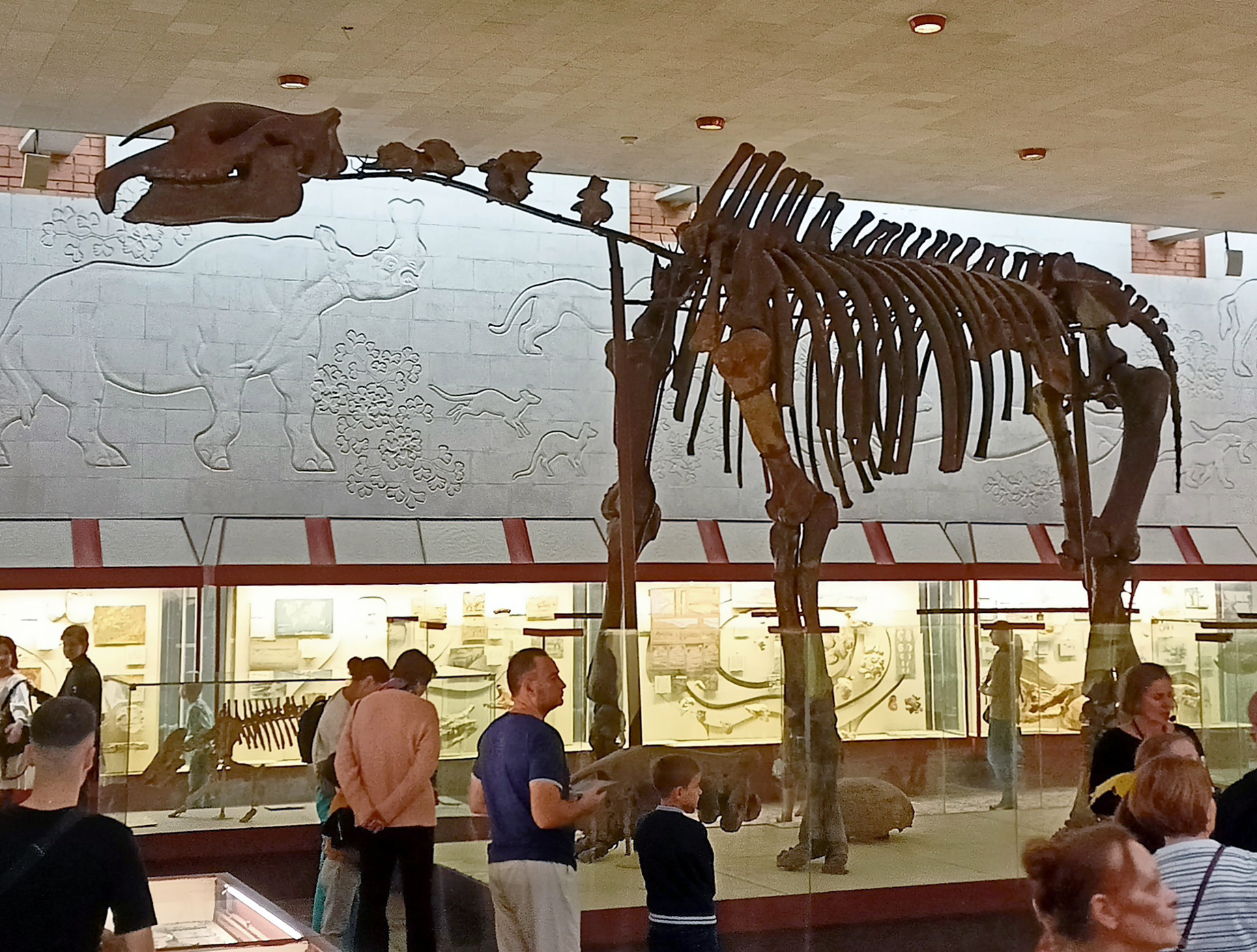
Skeleton of Paraceratherium, a rhinocerotoid

Megaherbivore dinosaurs died out in the Cretaceous–Paleogene mass extinction. For about 25 million years, the earth was void of large terrestrial herbivores that weighed more than 1 ton. After this period, small mammalian species evolved into large herbivores across every continent around 40 mya. The largest of these animals were Paraceratheriidae and Proboscidea. Other taxa included Brontotheriidae. The Sirenia, aquatic megaherbivores, such as Dugongidae, Protosirenidae, and Prorastomidae were present in the Eocene. Megaherbivores inhabited every major landmass in the Cenozoic and Pleistocene before the arrival of humans.

=== Pleistocene ===
There were around 50 different species by the Late Pleistocene:

- Mammalia
  - Marsupialia
    - Diprotodontidae (1 sp)
  - Placentalia
    - Afrotheria
      - Proboscidea
        Elephants, Mammoths (16 spp)
    - Boreoeutheria
      - Xenarthra
        - Cingulata
          Giant glyptodonts (5 spp)
        - Pilosa
          Giant sloths (8 spp)
      - Laurasiatheria
        - Panperissodactyla
          - Litopterna (1 sp)
          - Notoungulata toxodonts (1 sp)
          - Perissodactyla Rhinocerotoids (9 spp)
        - Artiodactyla
          - Hippopotamuses (2 spp)
          - - Giant camels (2 spp)
            - Giant bovids (3 spp)

Diprotodon, the largest marsupial to ever exist, was present across the entire Australian continent by the Late Pleistocene. Elsewhere, megaherbivores like glyptodonts were grazing herbivores, that possessed no incisor or canine teeth, but had cheek teeth that would have been able to grind up tough vegetation. They were inhabitants of South and North America. Ground sloths were herbivores, with some being browsers, others grazers, and some intermediate between the two as mixed feeders. Fossilized specimens were primarily found in South and North America, with one specimen being found as far north as Alaska. Mammoths, like modern day elephants, had hypsodont molars. These features allowed mammoths to live an expansive life because of the availability of grasses and trees. Today, only 18% of the 50 megaherbivore species persist. The Americas saw the worst decline in megaherbivores, with all 27 species going extinct.

The Quaternary Extinction Event is an event where many species of megafauna (particularly mammals) went extinct. This event caused the disappearances of megaherbivores on most continents on Earth. Climate change and the arrival of humans are considered likely causes of the extinctions. It is thought that humans hunted megaherbivores to extinction, which then led to the extinction of the carnivores and scavengers which had preyed upon those animals. Scientists have proposed that increasingly extreme weather—hotter summers and colder winters—referred to as "continentality", or related changes in rainfall caused the extinctions.

=== Recent ===
- Placentalia
  - - Proboscidea
      Elephants (3 spp)
- Boreoeutheria
  - - Perissodactyla
      Rhinoceroses (4 spp)
    - Artiodactyla
      - Giraffes (4 spp)
      - Hippopotamuses (1 sp)

There are twelve extant species of megaherbivores, found in Africa and Asia. They include elephants, rhinos, hippos, and giraffes. Elephants belong to the order Proboscidea; an order that has been around since the late Paleocene. Hippopotamuses are the closest living relatives to cetaceans; soon after the common ancestor of whales and hippos diverged from even-toed ungulates, the lineages of cetaceans and hippopotamuses split apart. Giraffidae are a sister taxon to Antilocapridae, with an estimated split of more than 20 million years ago, according to a 2019 genome study. Rhinoceroses may originate from Hyrachyus, an animal whose remains date back to the late Eocene.

Megaherbivores and other large herbivores are becoming less common throughout their natural distribution, impacting animal species within the ecosystem. This decline is mainly attributed to the destruction of their natural environment, agriculture, overhunting, and human invasion of their habitats. As a consequence of their slow reproductive rate and the preference for targeting larger species, overexploitation poses the greatest threat to megaherbivores. As time progresses, it is thought that the situation will only worsen.

== Ecology of recent megaherbivory ==
=== Browsers and grazers ===
Living species exhibit the following adaptations: they have dietary tolerance, a strong effect on vegetation and with the exception of calves, face little threat from predators.

Elephants and Indian rhinoceroses exhibit both grazing and browsing feeding habits. The hippopotamus and white rhinoceros prefer grazing herbivory, while giraffes and the three other rhinoceros species most often select browsing herbivory. Mammalian megaherbivores predominantly consume graminoids. They prefer eating the leaves and stem of the plant, as well as its fruits. They also exhibit both foregut and hindgut fermentation, with rhinos, hippos, and elephants displaying the former and giraffes displaying the latter. Their metabolic rate is lethargic, and as a result, digestion is slowed. During this prolonged digestion period, high-fiber plant matter is disintegrated.

Due to their size, megaherbivores can defoliate the landscape and are thus considered keystone species in their environment. Megaherbivores affect the composition of plant species, which alters the movement and exchange of inorganic and organic matter back into the production of matter. They can open up areas through feeding behavior, which over time clears vegetation, including invasive alien plants. The number of seeds that megaherbivores spread is greater than that of other frugivores. In addition, megaherbivore grazers, like the white rhino, have a profound impact on short grass. In one study, short grass became more infrequent after the elimination of white rhinos, which effected smaller grazers in the area.

In a 2018 study, it was concluded that megaherbivores were not affected by the "landscape of fear," a landscape in which prey avoid certain hot-spot predation areas, thereby altering predator-frightened trophic cascades. Their feces were most apparent in closed, dense areas, indicating that they distribute resources to risky areas in this "landscape of fear".

=== Interspecific interactions ===
Most megaherbivore species are too big and powerful for predators to kill. Calves are, however, targeted by several predator species. Giraffes are the most preyed upon megaherbivore, as it is not rare for lions to hunt adult giraffes in some places. The young are especially vulnerable, with a quarter to half of giraffe calves not reaching adulthood. In Chobe National Park, lions have been recorded hunting young and sub-adult elephants. Tigers are another known predator of young elephants. Hippo calves may sometimes be prey items for lions, spotted hyenas and Nile crocodiles.

Giraffes may flee or act in a non-aggressive manner, while white rhinos typically do not react to the presence of predators. Black and Indian rhinoceroses, elephants, and hippopotamuses on the other hand, react strongly to predators.

== Adaptations of extant megaherbivores ==
=== Size ===
Elephants are the largest members, weighing between 2.5 and 6.0 tons. Indian rhinos, white rhinos, and hippos usually weigh between 1.4 and 2.3 tons. The Javan and black rhino average 1–1.3 tons in weight. Giraffes are the smallest members, with a general weight range of 0.8–1.2 tons.

=== K-selection ===
Extant megaherbivores are K-selected species, meaning they have high life expectancies, slow population growth, large offspring, lengthy pregnancies, and low mortality rates. They have selected slow reproduction to enhance their survival chances, and as a result, increase their lifespan. Their large size offers protection from predators, but at the same, it decreases the degree at which they reproduce due to restricted food sources. This slow population growth (elephants, for example, grow at a rate of 6–7%), indicates that populations may be drastically reduced if predation pressures are too great. In stable environments, K-selection predominates as the ability to compete successfully for limited resources, and populations of K-selected organisms typically are very constant in number and close to the maximum that the environment can bear.

=== Reproduction ===
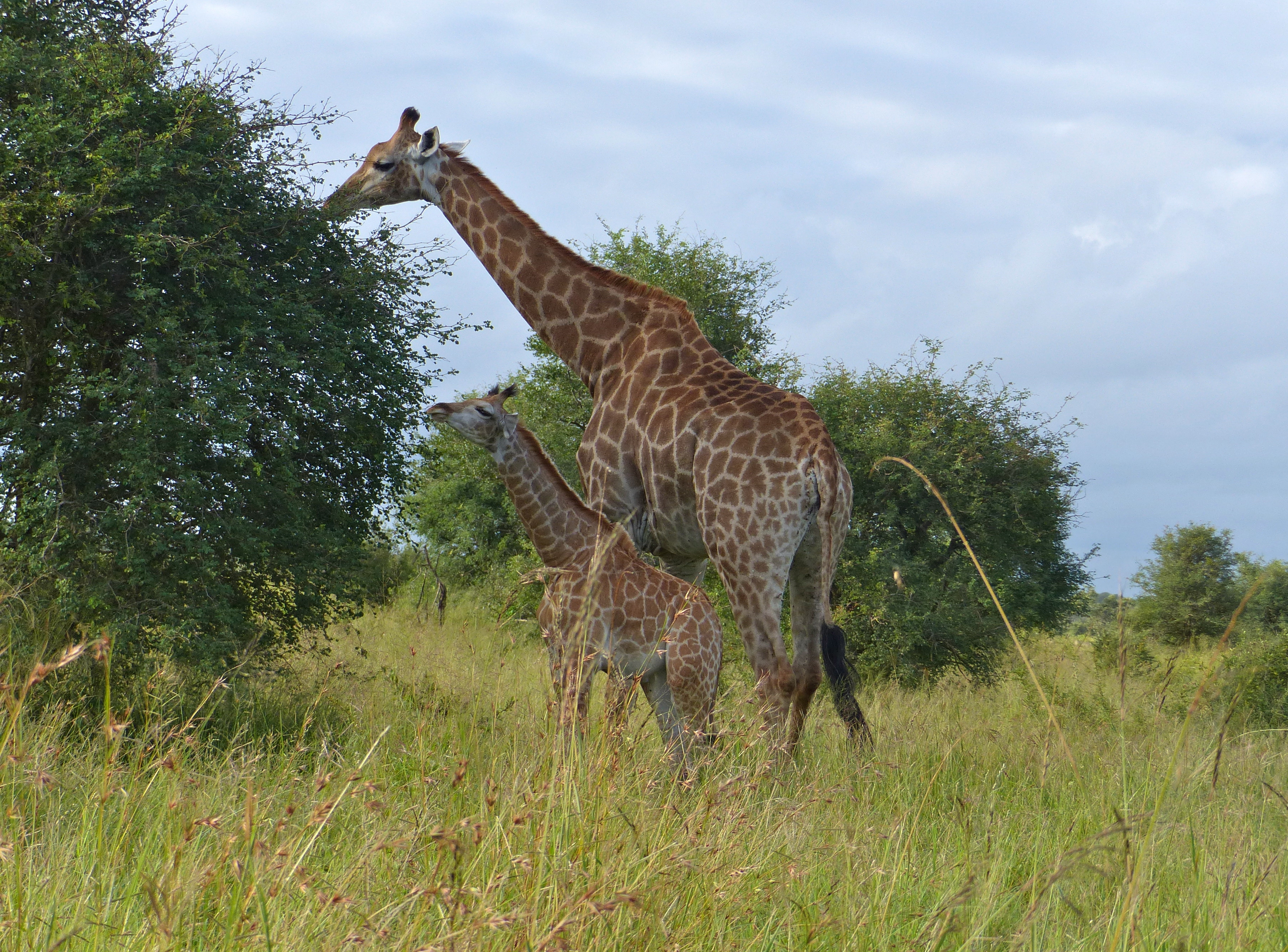
Giraffe calves do not stay with their mothers, but they instead sit down and hide for most of the day, as they wait for their mothers to briefly visit to feed them.

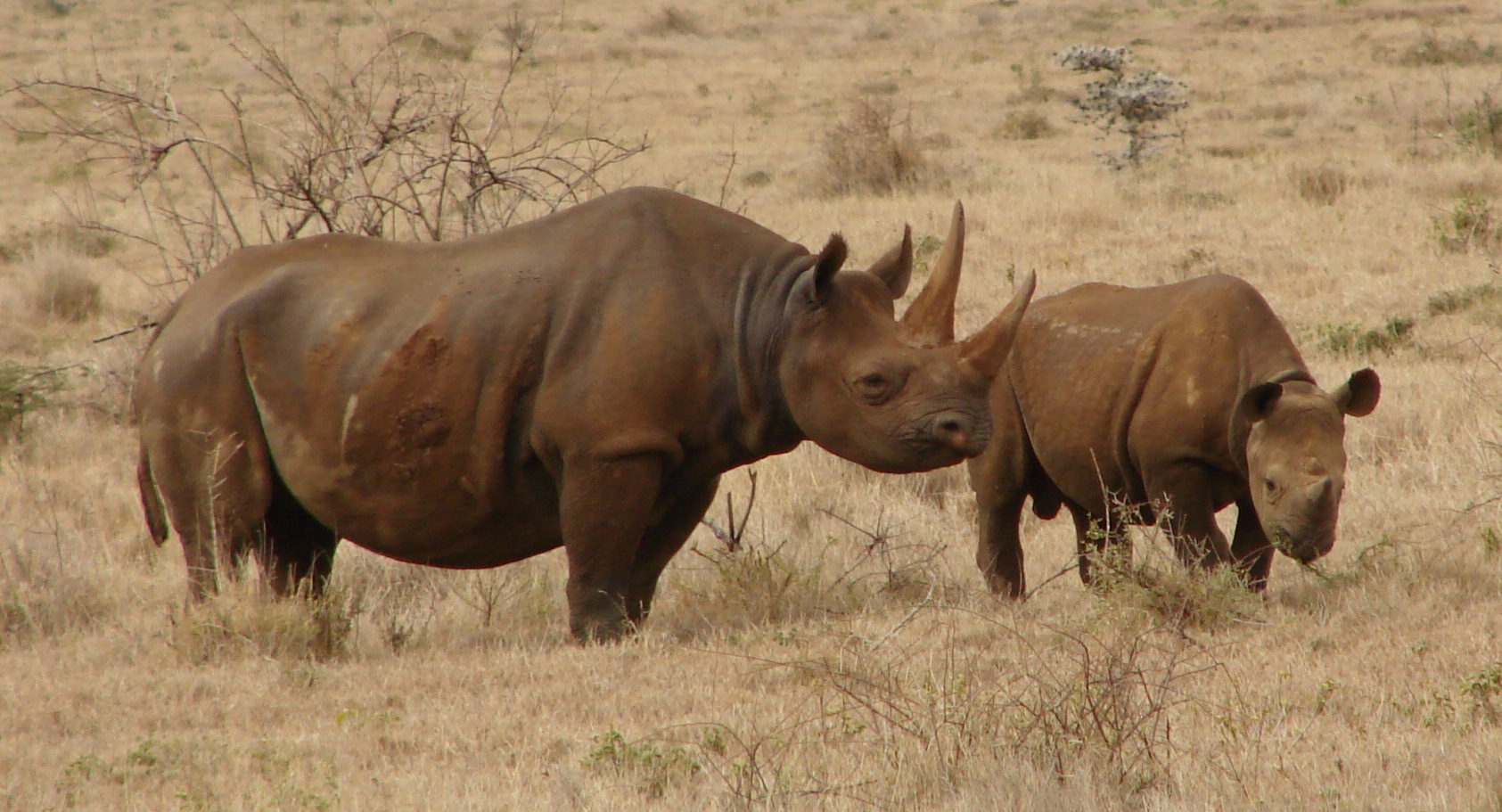
Black rhino calves are vulnerable to predators, and stay close to their mothers for 26 to 40 months.

When females enter estrus, males will attempt to attract them as a mating partner. These breeding opportunities may be influenced by the hierarchical system of males. Giraffes and elephants mate for a relatively short time, while rhinos and hippos have a mating session lasting an extended period of time. Females have long gestation periods, between 8 and 22 months. Intervals between births vary between species, but the overall range is 1.3 to 4.5 years.

They usually give birth to a single calf that is heavily reliant on females for food and protection. As they get older, the calf begins weaning while still suckling. When they reach juvenility, they are able to fend for themselves, but only to a certain extent. Females typically separate from their offspring by chasing them. Despite this, females may continue to interact with their progeny even after weaning.

=== Lifespan and mortality ===
Hippopotamuses and rhinoceroses can live to be 40 years old, while elephants can live longer than 60 years. Giraffes have a lifespan of around 25 years.

Around 2 to 5% of adult megaherbivores die each year. Males are more likely than females to die from wounds sustained during disputes. Occasionally, in times of drought, populations may significantly reduce, with calves being the most impacted during such times.

== See also ==
- Australian megafauna
- Deep-sea gigantism
- Largest and heaviest animals
- List of extant megaherbivores
