= Protosiren eothene =

Scientific classification
- Domain: Eukaryota
- Kingdom: Animalia
- Phylum: Chordata
- Class: Mammalia
- Order: Sirenia
- Family: †Protosirenidae
- Genus: †Protosiren
- Species: †P. eothene

Binomial name
- †Protosiren eothene Zalmout et al., 2003

Extinct species of aquatic mammal

Protosiren eothene is a species of Lutetian sirenian, found in the upper part of the Habib Rahi Formation, Pakistan.
