= Dakhlasiren =

Dakhlasiren Temporal range: Late Eocene

Scientific classification
- Kingdom: Animalia
- Phylum: Chordata
- Class: Mammalia
- Infraclass: Placentalia
- Order: Sirenia
- Family: †Protosirenidae
- Genus: †Dakhlasiren
- Species: †D. marocensis

Binomial name
- †Dakhlasiren marocensis Zouhri et al., 2022

Extinct genus of mammals

Dakhlasiren is an extinct genus of sirenian that lived off the shore of what is now Morocco during the Late Eocene. It contains a single species, Dakhlasiren marocensis.
