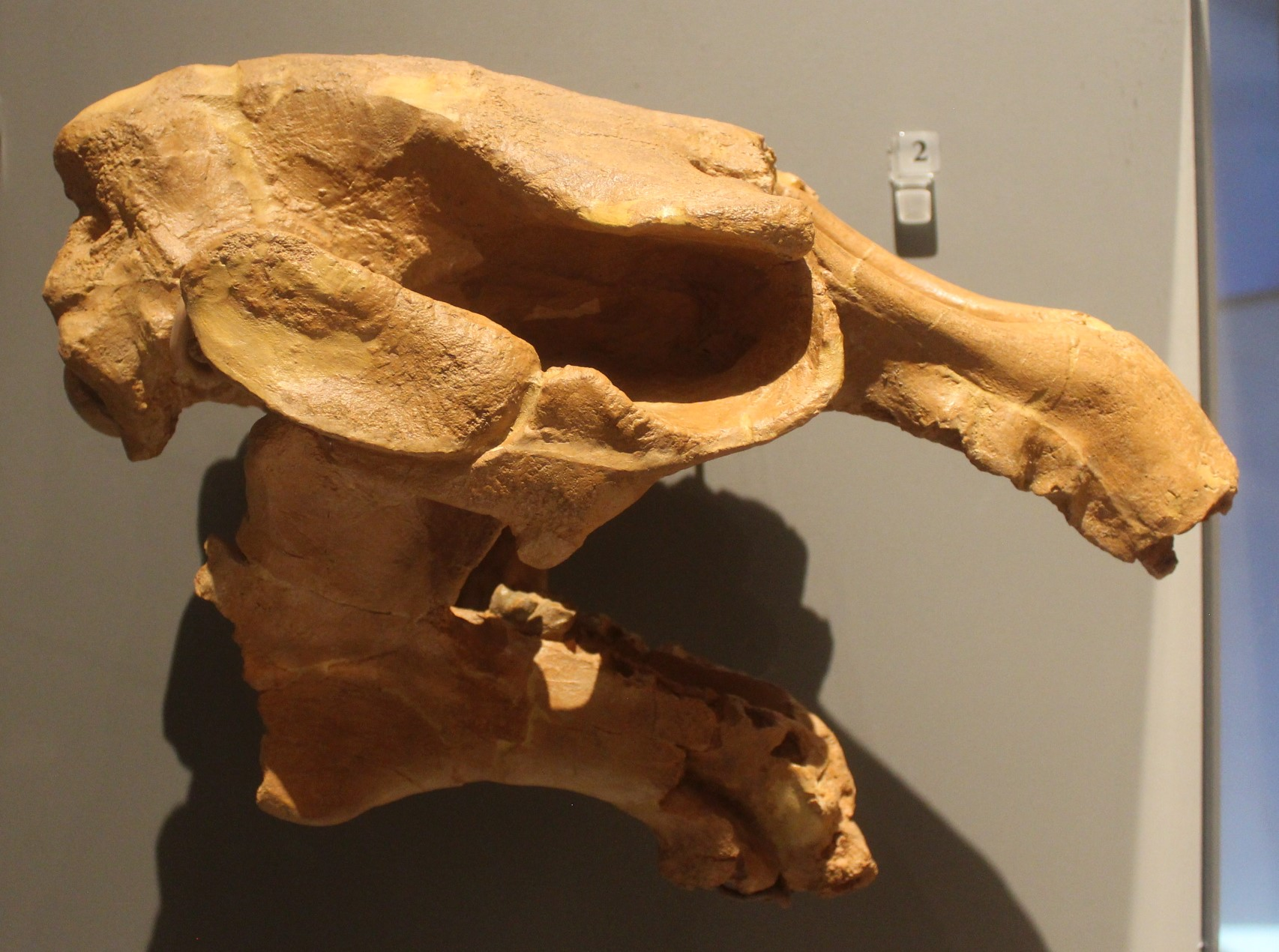
- P. smithae skull, University of Michigan Museum of Natural History

Scientific classification
- Kingdom: Animalia
- Phylum: Chordata
- Class: Mammalia
- Infraclass: Placentalia
- Order: Sirenia
- Family: †Protosirenidae
- Genus: †Protosiren; Abel, 1904

Species
- Protosiren eothene Zalmout et al., 2003; Protosiren fraasi (type) Abel, 1904; Protosiren minima (Demarest, 1822); Protosiren sattaensisGingerich et al., 1995; Protosiren smithae Domning and Gingerich, 1994

= Protosiren =

Protosiren Temporal range: 46–37 Ma

Extinct genus of aquatic mammals

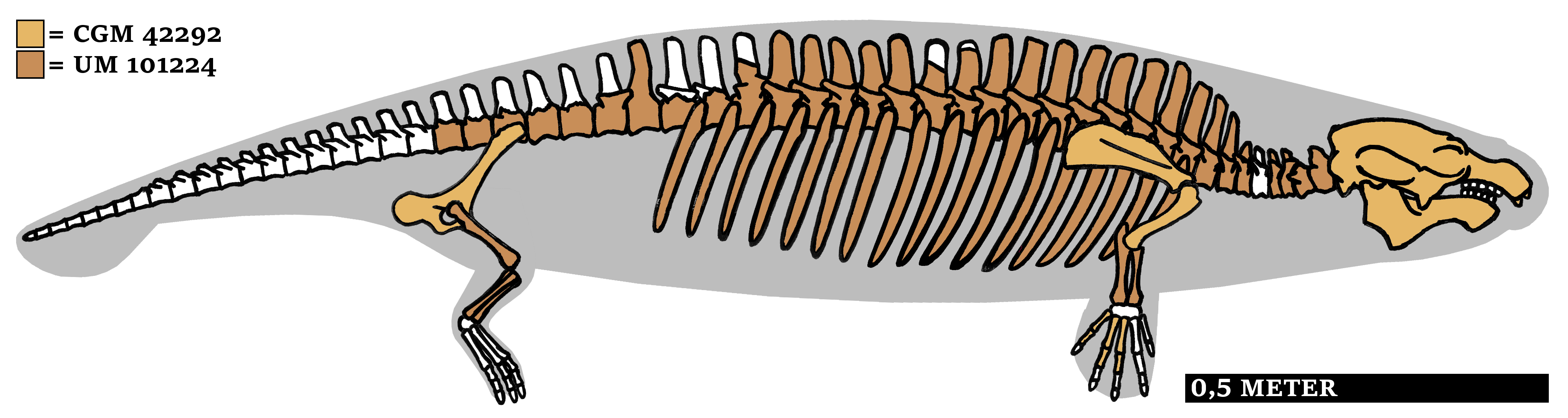
Drawing of skeleton

Protosiren is an extinct early genus of the order Sirenia. Protosiren existed throughout the Lutetian to Priabonian stages of the Middle Eocene. Fossils have been found in the far-flung locations like the United States (South Carolina, North Carolina and Florida), Africa (Egypt), Europe (France, Germany and Hungary) and Asia (India and Pakistan).

So far, five species have been named. From comparative anatomy and chronological order, it has been suggested that P. fraasi, P. sattaensis and P. smithae represent an ancestor-descendant lineage. P. eothene is the oldest and smallest species.

== Ecology ==
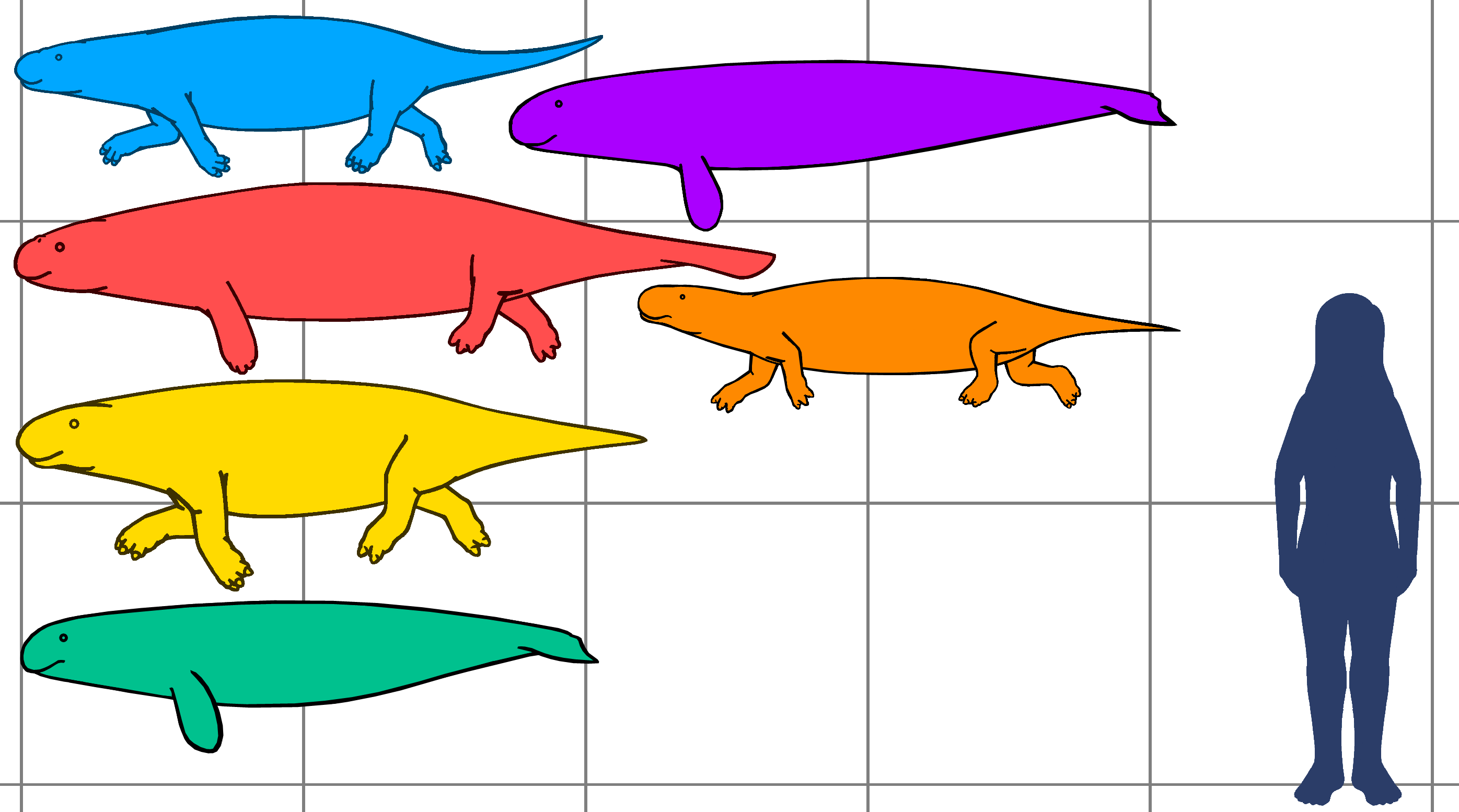
Size of Protosiren (red) compared to three other Eocene sirenian taxa and a human.

Like the extant sirenians (manatee and dugong), Protosiren is thought to have fed on sea grasses as well as freshwater plants. Unlike extant sirenians, Protosiren had hind limbs. Although the limbs were well-developed, they were small and the sacroiliac joint was weak. Consequently, Protosiren is thought to have been only or primarily aquatic, rarely venturing on to land. It has been speculated that it swam by caudal undulation and used its hind limbs to crawl along sea floors in nearshore habitats while feeding. It might have occupied a different ecological niche than the contemporary Eotheroides, which had a closer resemblance to modern sirenians.

Larger species like P. fraasi and P. smithae could have reached up to 2.7 metres (8.9 ft) long and up to 250 kilograms (550 lb).

== See also ==
- Evolution of sirenians
