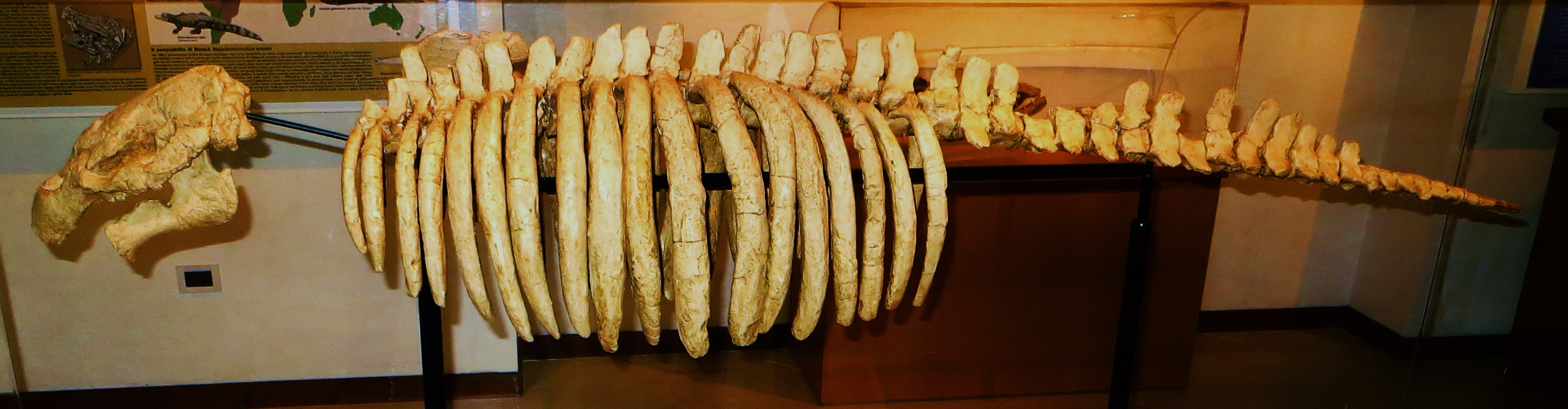
- Mounted Prototherium veronense skeleton

Scientific classification
- Kingdom: Animalia
- Phylum: Chordata
- Class: Mammalia
- Order: Sirenia
- Family: Dugongidae
- Genus: Prototherium de Zigno, 1887

Species
- Prototherium veronense (de Zigno, 1887) (type); Prototherium ausetanum Balaguer & Alba, 2016; Prototherium intermedium Bizzotto, 1983; Prototherium transylvanicum Codrea, 2026

= Prototherium =

Prototherium Temporal range: Middle Eocene–Late Eocene

Extinct genus of mammals

Prototherium is a genus of extinct sirenian related to the dugong. It is known from middle (Bartonian) and upper Eocene deposits in Italy, Romania and Spain. Type species is P. veronenses (Zigno, 1887)

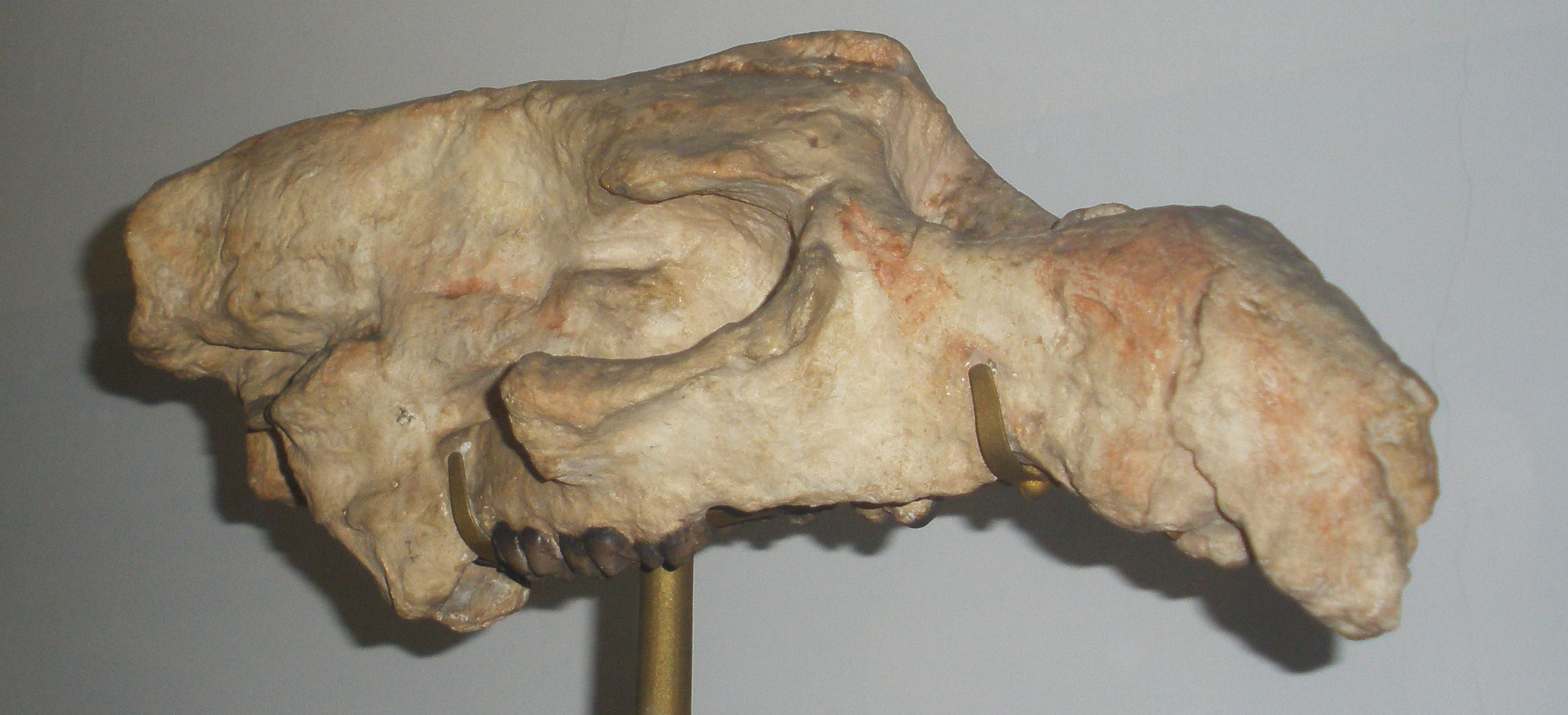
P. veronense skull

life reconstruction of Prototherium

Three species are now included in the genus, but their phylogenetic relations are not resolved and possibly one of them Prototherium intermedium Bizzotto 1983 must be excluded. In the same way, relations between Prototherium and other genus are confused and need revision. A third species was described in Spain in 2016, P.ausetanum.

== See also ==
- Evolution of sirenians
