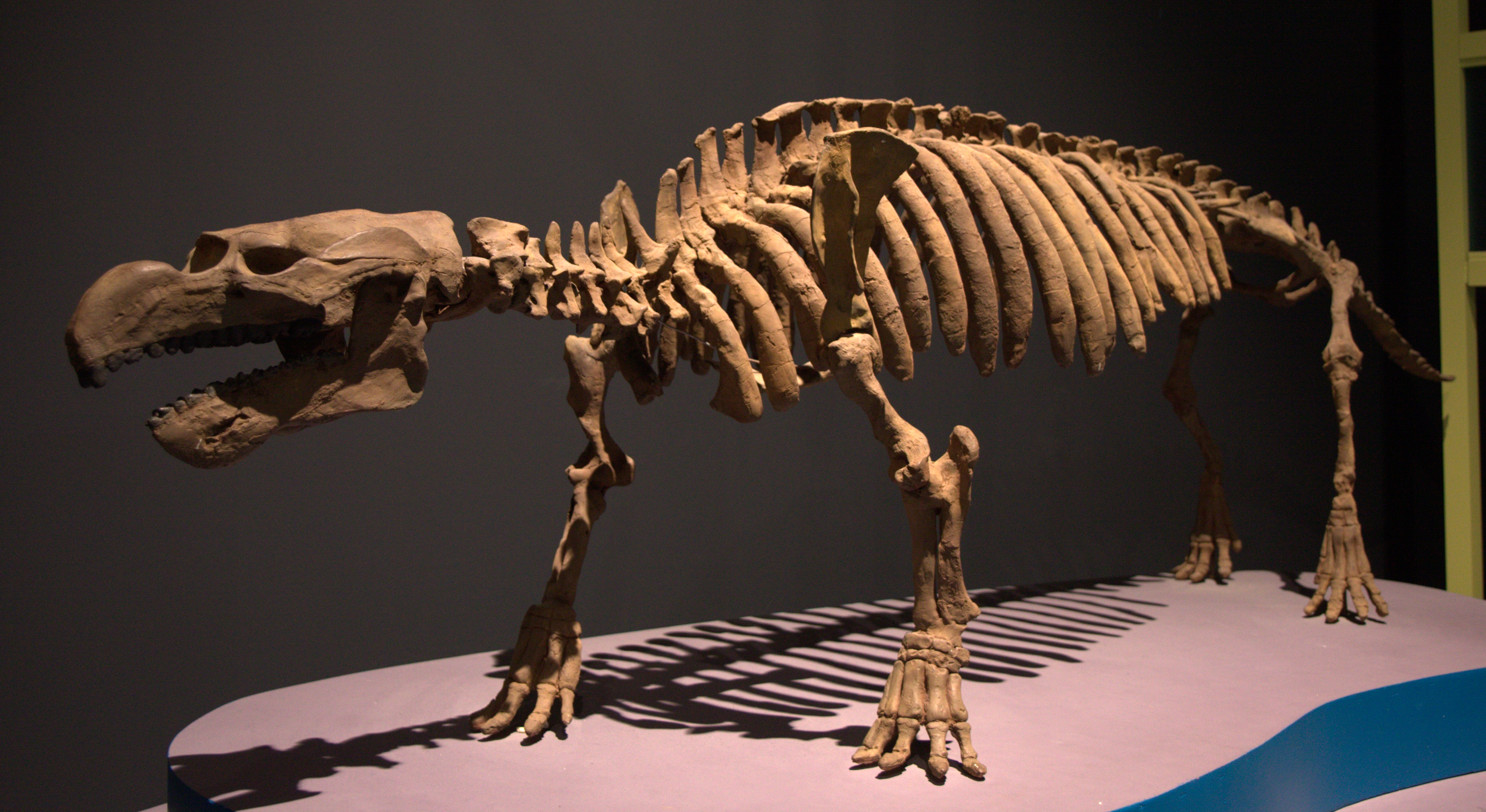
- Mounted skeleton

Scientific classification
- Kingdom: Animalia
- Phylum: Chordata
- Class: Mammalia
- Order: Sirenia
- Family: †Prorastomidae
- Genus: †Pezosiren; Domning, 2001
- Species: †P. portelli

Binomial name
- †Pezosiren portelli Domning, 2001

= Pezosiren =

Pezosiren Temporal range: Early Eocene (Lutetian), 49–46 Ma

Prehistoric amphibious mammal

Pezosiren portelli, also known as the "walking manatee", is a basal sirenian from the early Eocene of Jamaica, 50 million years ago. The type specimen is represented by a Jamaican fossil skeleton, described in 2001 by Daryl Domning, a marine mammal paleontologist at Howard University in Washington, DC. It is believed to have had a hippopotamus-like amphibious lifestyle, and is considered a transitional form between land and sea mammals.

== Discovery ==
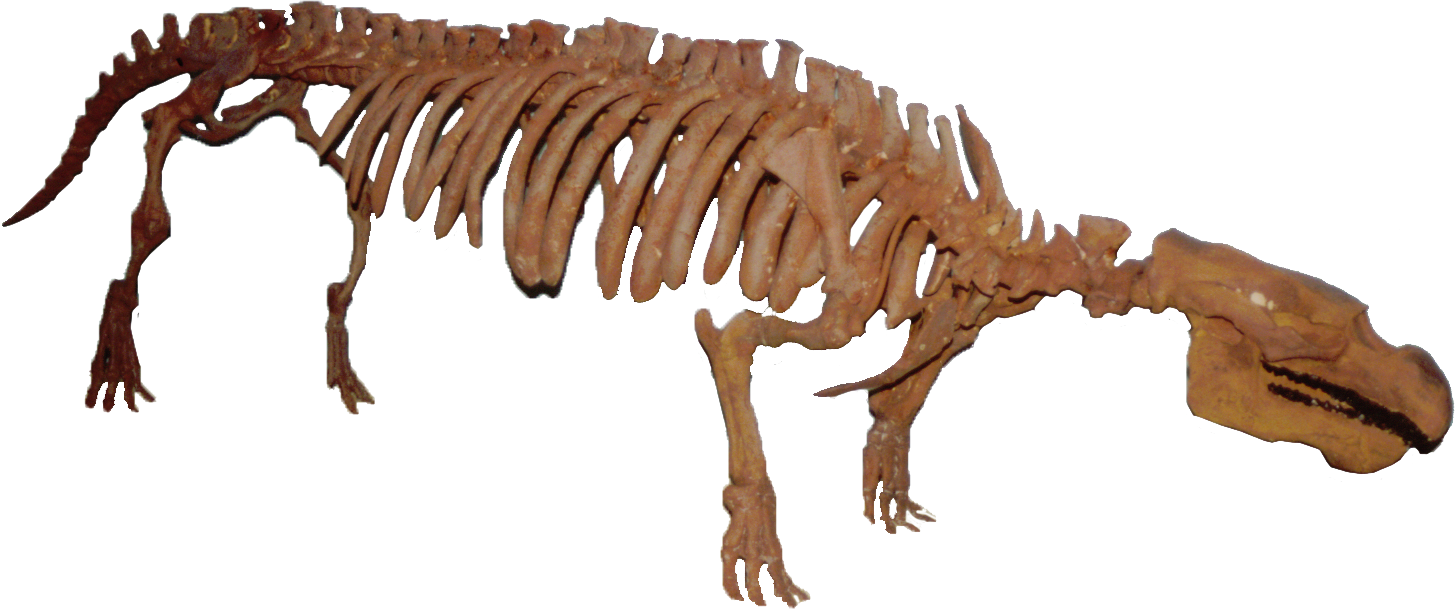
P. portelli cast skeleton produced and distributed by Triebold Paleontology Incorporated

In the 1990s, vertebrate fossils were found in lagoon deposits at Seven Rivers in Jamaica by Daryl Domning and colleagues. The site is rich in fossils, and yielded hundreds of bones of mainly aquatic vertebrates, a primitive rhinoceros, and possibly a primate. In 2001, Domning named Pezosiren portelli based on sirenian bones found at Seven Rivers.

The Seven Rivers site is not only one of the very rare examples of a noncave deposit in the West Indies, but also the oldest discovered so far, with an age of late Early or early Middle Eocene, as attributed by Robinson in 1988. The presence of Pezosiren in Jamaica can be explained as evidence of an Eocene land bridge connecting North America, the Mexican Arc, the Chortis Block, the Nicaragua Rise, and Jamaica. Whatever might be the origin of this sirenian, it had no further impact in the history of the Antillean mammals, because Jamaica became submerged soon after and with it any terrestrial forms. The rest of the accompanying fossil fauna consists mainly of aquatic vertebrates—fishes, crocodilians, and turtles- and a rhinocerotid species (Hyrachyus).

== Description ==
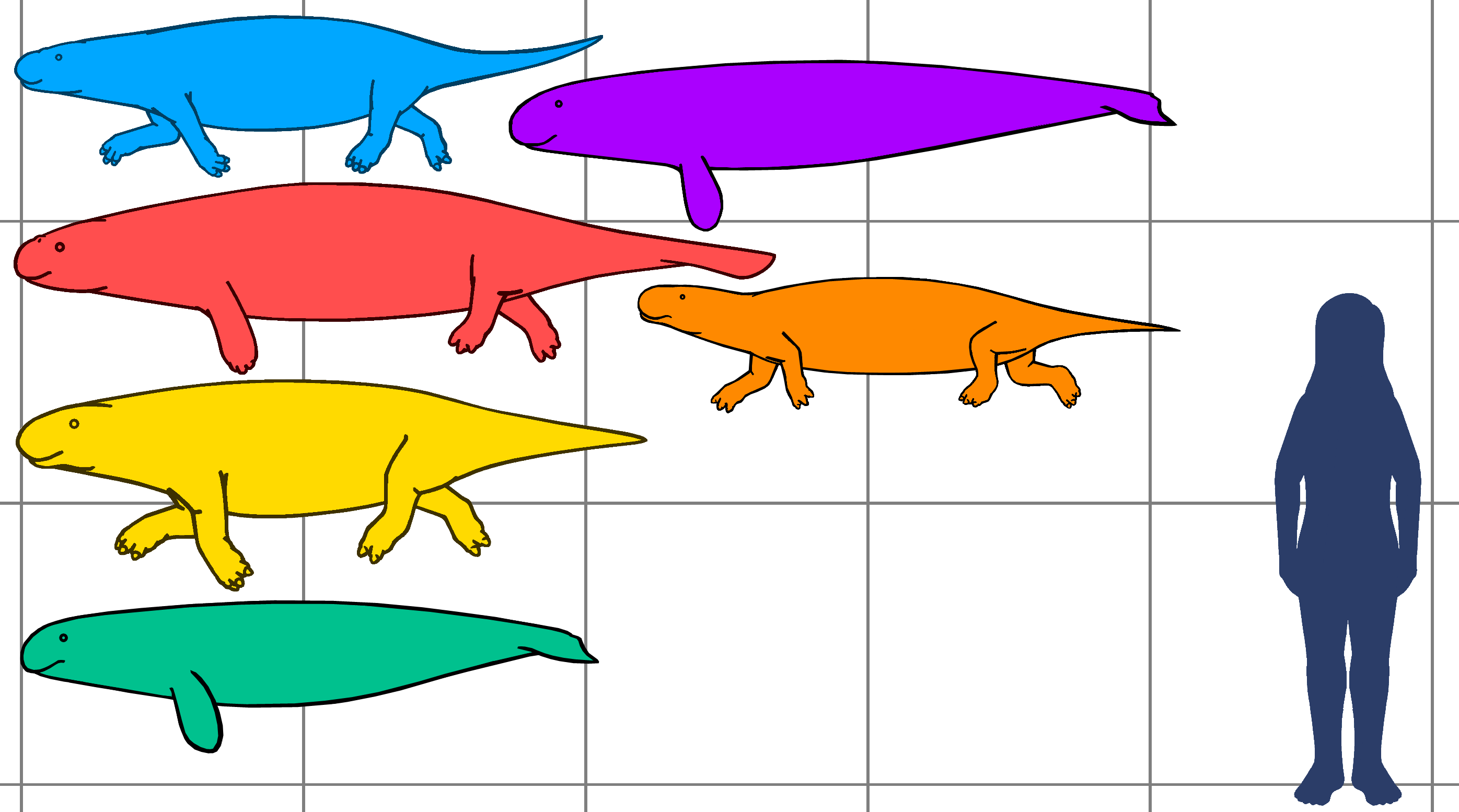
Drawing of swimming Pezosiren (blue) compared to some other Eocene sirenian taxa.

So far, Pezosiren are not known from a single complete skeleton. The original description is based on several partial skeletons and “several hundred” isolated cranial and postcranial elements collected from three different bone beds within the Chapelton Formation. Domning had been looking at sirenian fossils from five different bone beds within a 5 meters thick stratigraphic section of the formation and concluded that remains in the three lower bone beds "appear to represent a single taxon". From these, an almost complete skeleton was composed, only missing most of the feet and the tail. It was the first known quadrupedal sirenian.

The remains of Pezosiren indicate that while it had four limbs adapted to walking on land, the skull, teeth, and heavy ribs are more typical of modern sirenians, such as manatees and dugongs. The living animal is estimated to have been "pig-sized", or roughly 2 meters long (depending on the length of its tail).

Based on the known tail vertebrae, researchers argue that Pezosiren, like its European relative Sobrarbesiren, did not use the tail to propel in the water, but rather used its hind limbs in a mode similar to otters.

== See also ==
- Evolution of sirenians
- Prorastomus
