= List of extant megaherbivores =

Extant megaherbivores

An African bush elephant and a southern giraffe in Etosha National Park, Namibia

Extant megaherbivores are large megafaunal herbivores that exceed 1,000 kg (2,200 lb) in weight. They include twelve species of elephants, rhinoceroses, hippopotamuses, and giraffes distributed across Africa and Asia. Keystone species in their environment, megaherbivores perform important ecological functions such as habitat defoliation and extensive seed dispersal. They are K-selected animals, meaning they have high life expectancies, slow population growth, few offspring, lengthy pregnancies, late puberty, and low mortality rates. They evolved slow reproduction to enhance their survival chances and as a result, increase their lifespan. Their large size offers protection from predators but decreases the rate of reproduction due to restricted food sources.

Throughout Africa and Asia, habitat destruction, agriculture, overhunting, and human invasion have caused declines in megaherbivore populations. Due to their slow reproductive rates, overexploitation poses the greatest threat to megaherbivores.

== List ==
List of extant megaherbivores (Note: The following classification is based on taxonomic descriptions by the American Society of Mammalogists.)
Common name (Scientific name)	Image	Description	Weight	IUCN status and estimated population
Elephants
African bush elephant (Loxodonta africana)	Side view of African bush elephant male	The African bush elephant, also known as the Savanna elephant, is one of three members of the family Elephantidae, of which it is the largest member. It is native to a large part of sub-Saharan Africa and is characterized by its large size, huge ears, long trunk with two finger-like processes, and large ivory tusks.	4,000 to 7,000 kg (8,800 to 15,400 lb)	EN; 472,269
Asian elephant (Elephas maximus)	Front view of Asian elephant in green vegetation	The Asian elephant, also known as the Asiatic elephant, is the second largest elephant species. It is native to the Indian subcontinent and Southeast Asia. The ears are relatively small compared to African elephants and its back is convex. The trunk has a single finger-like process and contains over 60,000 muscles. Tusks are rare in females and usually occur in males.	2,720 to 5,400 kg (6,000 to 11,900 lb)	EN; 48,323–51,680
African forest elephant (Loxodonta cyclotis)	Mother and calf in a river	The African forest elephant is the smallest species of elephant and is one of two species of African elephants, the other being the African bush elephant. It is native to West Africa and the Congo Basin. Its trunk has two finger-like processes and contains about 40–60,000 muscles. It has tusks that grow from 1.6 to 2 m (5 ft 3 in to 6 ft 7 in) long and weigh 25–30 kg (55–66 lb).	2,000 to 4,000 kg (4,400 to 8,800 lb)	CR; 135,690
Rhinos and hippos
White rhinoceros (Ceratotherium simum)	Side view of white rhinoceros on road	The white rhinoceros, sometimes called the white rhino, or square-lipped rhinoceros, is a large rhinoceros native to sub-Saharan Africa. The largest extant rhino species, it has two horns, with the larger front horn growing up to 101 cm (40 in). It is light grey in complexion and has a conspicuous hump on the back of the neck.	1,600 to 2,300 kg (3,500 to 5,100 lb)	NT; 18,064
Indian rhinoceros (Rhinoceros unicornis)	Side view of Indian rhinoceros near a river	The Indian rhinoceros, also known as the Indian rhino, greater one-horned rhinoceros, or great Indian rhinoceros, is the second largest extant rhinoceros. It is native to the Indian subcontinent, and has prominent lumps on its skin and one horn that grows to a length of about 25 cm (9.8 in).	1,600 to 2,100 kg (3,500 to 4,600 lb)	VU; 3,588
Hippopotamus (Hippopotamus amphibius)	Side view of hippopotamus in shallow water	The hippopotamus, also known as the hippo, common hippopotamus, or river hippopotamus, is a large mammal native to sub-Saharan Africa. It is semiaquatic and spends most of its time resting in water. It has large canines up to 50 cm (20 in) long and its incisors can grow to 40 cm (16 in). The torso is barrel-shaped with pillar-like legs and the body is nearly hairless.	1,365 to 2,025 kg (3,009 to 4,464 lb)	VU; 115,000–130,000
Black rhinoceros (Diceros bicornis)	Black rhinoceros, facing the right, on the move	The black rhinoceros, also called the black rhino, or hook-lipped rhinoceros, is a species of rhinoceros native to Southern and East Africa. It has two horns made of keratin, with the larger front horn growing up to 140 cm (55 in). It is actually brown or grey rather than black.	708 to 1,313 kg (1,561 to 2,895 lb)	CR; 5,630
Javan rhinoceros (Rhinoceros sondaicus)	Black and white image of Javan rhinoceros in captivity	The Javan rhinoceros, Javan rhino, Sunda rhinoceros, or lesser one-horned rhinoceros is a very rare rhinoceros species. With only 74 individuals left, it is critically endangered and only survives in one place: the Ujung Kulon National Park in western Java. Horns are only present in males and can grow up to 27 cm (11 in).	800 to 1,300 kg (1,800 to 2,900 lb)	CR; 74
Giraffes
Maasai giraffe (Giraffa tippelskirchi)	Side view of an adult Maasai giraffe looking over its environment	The Masai giraffe, also called the Maasai giraffe, or the Kilimanjaro giraffe, is a species of giraffe native to East Africa. It is the tallest terrestrial animal and has an extremely long neck that can grow up to 2.4 m (7 ft 10 in). Male and female giraffes both have horn-like structures called ossicones, which in males can reach 13.5 cm (5.3 in).	800 to 1,200 kg (1,800 to 2,600 lb)	EN; 35,000
Southern giraffe (Giraffa giraffa)	Side view of a Southern giraffe slightly bending its neck down	The southern giraffe, also known as the two-horned giraffe, is a species of giraffe native to Southern Africa. It has a light tan coat with circular spots outlined with star-like streaks that stretch down to the hooves.	800 to 1,200 kg (1,800 to 2,600 lb)	NE; 34,418
Reticulated giraffe (Giraffa reticulata)	Side view of reticulated giraffe walking past some trees in the background	The reticulated giraffe, also known as the Somali giraffe, is a species of giraffe native to the Horn of Africa. Its coat has block-like polygonal patches that are reddish-brown in color and that are surrounded by thin white lines; these patches can sometimes extend under the hocks. A medium hump is present in males.	800 to 1,200 kg (1,800 to 2,600 lb)	EN; 15,785
Northern giraffe (Giraffa camelopardalis)	A Northern giraffe facing the camera in lush green vegetation	The northern giraffe, also known as the three-horned giraffe, is a species of giraffe native to North Africa. Often mistaken for the southern giraffe, the northern giraffe differs by having longer and larger ossicones. In males, a third ossicone ranging from 76 to 127 mm (3.0 to 5.0 in) long is situated above the eyes.	800 to 1,200 kg (1,800 to 2,600 lb)	VU; 3,050
