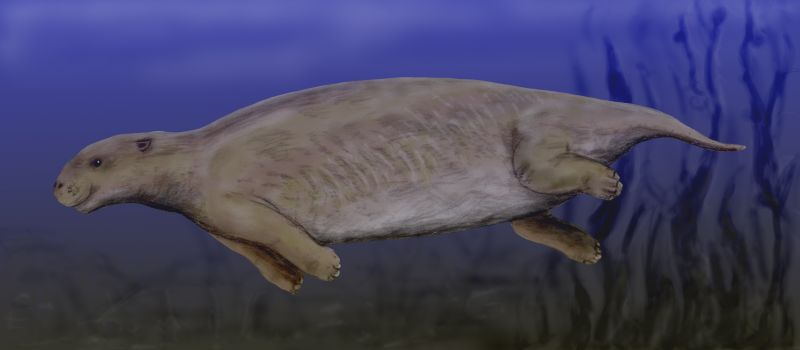

Scientific classification
- Kingdom: Animalia
- Phylum: Chordata
- Class: Mammalia
- Order: Sirenia
- Family: †Prorastomidae
- Genus: †Prorastomus; Owen, 1855
- Species: †P. sirenoides

Binomial name
- †Prorastomus sirenoides Owen, 1855

= Prorastomus =

Prorastomus Temporal range: Middle Eocene

Extinct genus of mammals

Prorastomus sirenoides is an extinct species of primitive sirenian that lived during the Eocene Epoch 40 million years ago in Jamaica.

== Taxonomy ==
The generic name Prorastomus, a combination of Greek πρῷρα (prōra), prow, and στόμα (stoma), mouth, refers to the lower jaw of the animal "resembling the prow of a wherry".

The genus name Prorastomus comes from Greek prora meaning "prow" and Latin stomus meaning "mouth." In 1892, naturalist Richard Lydekker respelled it as Prorastoma with a feminine ending, however this was unjustified as stomus, masculine in Latin, has priority.

Prorastomus is one of two genera of the family Prorastomidae, the other Pezosiren. These two species are the oldest sirenians, dating to the Eocene.

The first specimen was described by paleontologist Sir Richard Owen in 1855, and, being found in Jamaica in the Yellow Limestone Group, pointed to the origin of Sirenia as being in the New World rather than the Old World as was previously thought. However, the modern understanding of Afrotheria as a clade that originally diversified in Africa overturns this idea. The holotype specimen, BMNH 44897, comprises a skull, jaw, and atlas of the neck vertebrae. When Owen first acquired the skull, it was broken in two between the eyes and the braincase. Another specimen was found in 1989 in the same formation, USNM 437769, comprising the frontal bone, a tusk, vertebrae fragments, and ribs.

== Description ==
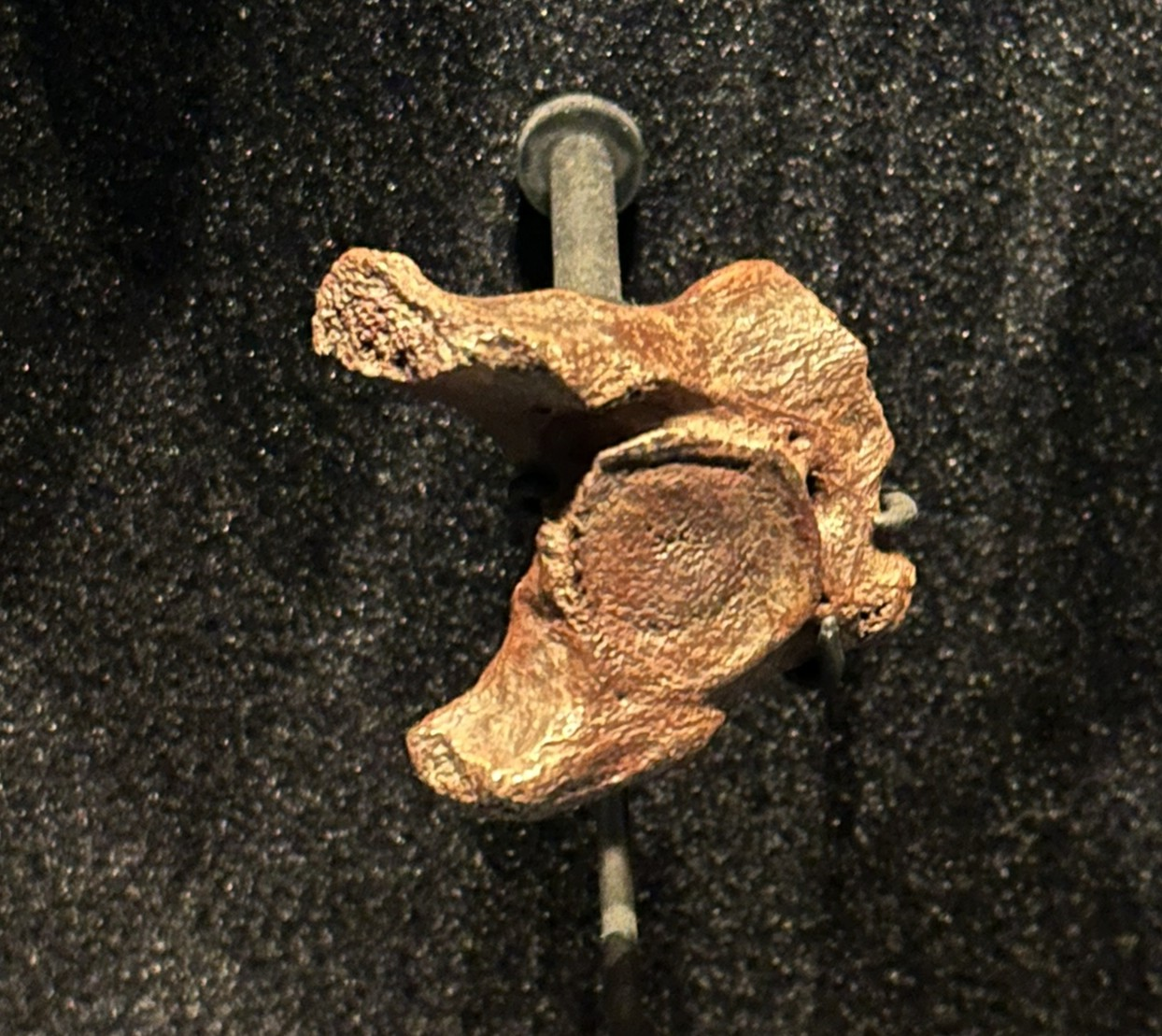
Fossil vertebra, Florida Museum of Natural History

While modern sirenians are fully aquatic, the 1.5 metres (4.9 ft) and 150 kilograms (330 lb) Prorastomus was predominantly terrestrial, judging from the structure of its skull. Judging from its crown-shaped molars and the shape of its snout, it fed on soft plants. The snout is long, narrow, and, at the tip, bulbous. The nasal bones are larger than other sirenians. The nasal ridge is well developed, indicating it had a good sense of smell. The frontal bones are smaller than usual for sirenians, though, as in other sirenians, it had a pronounced brow ridge. Since Pezosiren has a sagittal crest, it is possible the Prorastomus specimen had one too before being eroded away.

== See also ==
- Evolution of sirenians
- Pezosiren
