= Evolution of sirenians =

Development from a Tethytherian ancestor and radiation of species

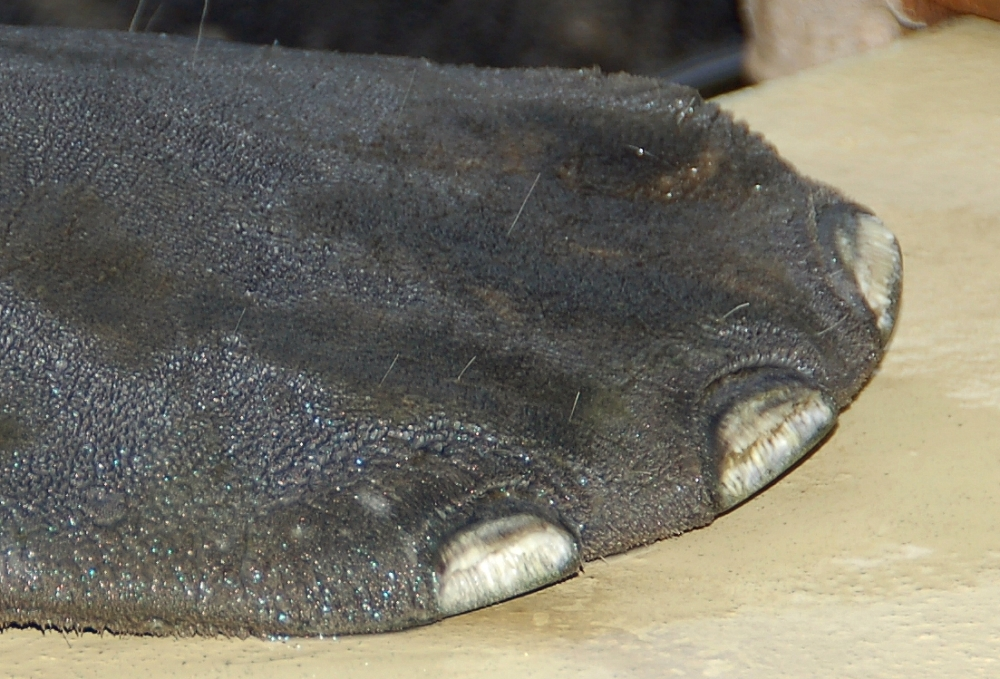
The foot of a manatee. Manatees are believed to share common ancestry with elephants.

Sirenia is the order of placental mammals which comprises modern "sea cows" (manatees and the Dugong) and their extinct relatives. They are the only extant herbivorous marine mammals and the only group of herbivorous mammals to have become completely aquatic. Sirenians are thought to have a 50-million-year-old fossil record (early Eocene-recent). They attained modest diversity during the Oligocene and Miocene, but have since declined as a result of climatic cooling, oceanographic changes, and human interference. Two genera and four species are extant: Trichechus, which includes the three species of manatee that live along the Atlantic coasts and in rivers and coastlines of the Americas and western Africa, and Dugong, which is found in the Indian and Pacific oceans.

== Origins ==
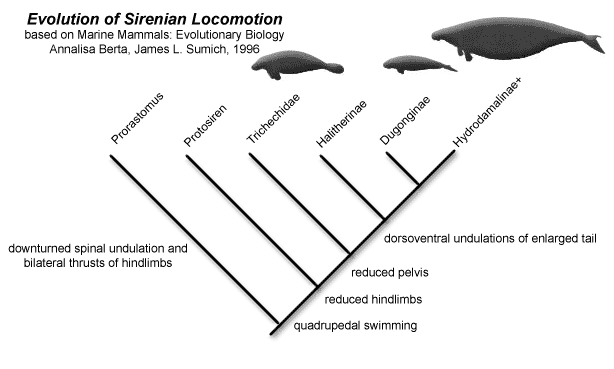
Evolution of Sirenian Locomotion, based on Berta and Sumich, 1999.

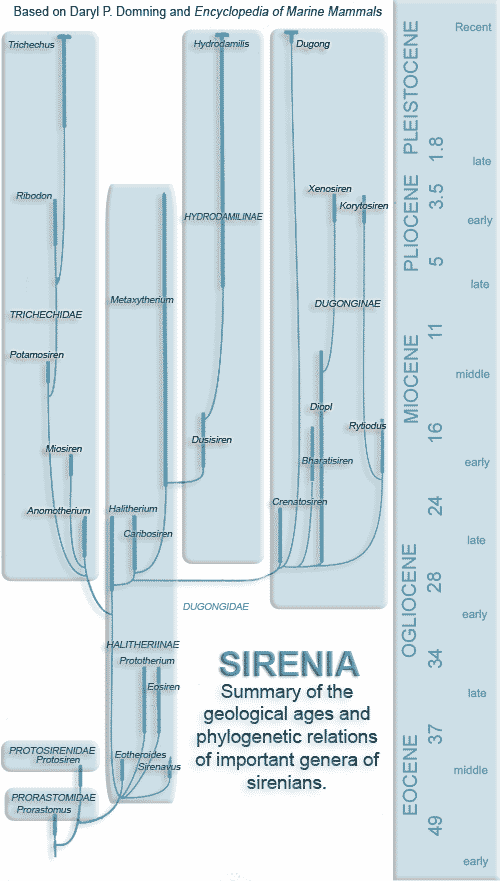
Evolution of Sirenia, based on Daryl P. Domning and Encyclopedia of Marine Mammals.

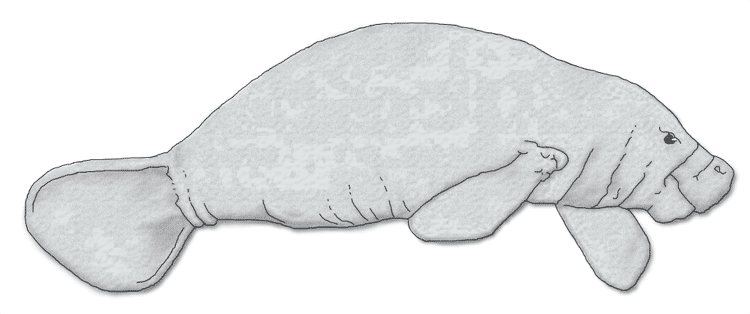
Amazonian manatee

West Indian manatee

Sirenians, along with Proboscidea (elephants), group together with the extinct Desmostylia and likely the extinct Embrithopoda to form the Tethytheria. Tethytheria is thought to have evolved from primitive hoofed mammals ("condylarths") along the shores of the ancient Tethys Ocean.

Tethytheria, combined with Hyracoidea (hyraxes), forms a clade called Paenungulata. Paenungulata and Tethytheria (especially the latter) are among the least controversial mammalian clades, with strong support from morphological and molecular interpretations. The ancestry of Sirenia is remote from that of Cetacea and Pinnipedia, although they are thought to have evolved an aquatic lifestyle around the same time.

== Fossil history ==
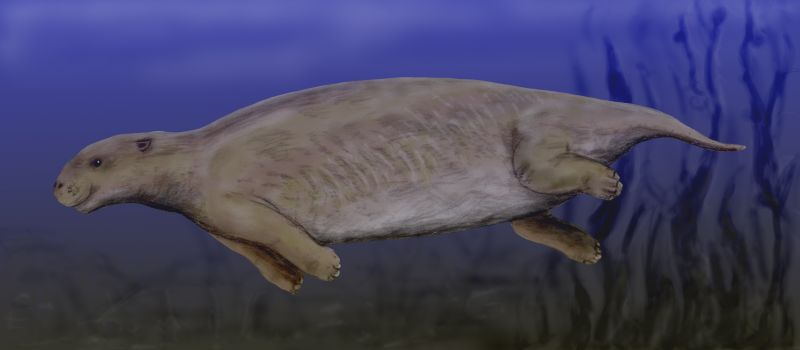
Prorastomus, an early sirenian from the Eocene

The first appearance of sirenians in the fossil record was during the early Eocene, and by the late Eocene, sirenians had significantly diversified. Inhabitants of rivers, estuaries, and nearshore marine waters, they were able to spread rapidly. The most primitive sirenian known to date, Prorastomus, was found in Jamaica, not the Old World; however more recently the contemporary Sobrarbesiren has been recovered from Spain. The first known quadrupedal sirenian was Pezosiren from the early Eocene. The earliest known sea cows, of the families Prorastomidae and Protosirenidae, are both confined to the Eocene, and were about the size of a pig, four-legged amphibious creatures. By the time the Eocene drew to a close, came the appearance of the Dugongidae; sirenians had acquired their familiar fully aquatic streamlined body with flipper-like front legs with no hind limbs, powerful tail with horizontal caudal fin, with up and down movements which move them through the water, like cetaceans.

In Western Europe the first and oldest sirenian remains have been found in a new paleontological site, in Santa Brígida, Amer (La Selva, Catalonia, Spain). The age is dated by the Shallow Bentic Zones in the Eoceno SBZ 15).

The last of the sirenian families to appear, Trichechidae, are thought to have originated from early dugongids in the late Eocene or early Oligocene. The current fossil record documents some major stages in hindlimb and pelvic reduction (well developed hindlimbs attached to a sacrum (Prorastomidae), well developed hindlimbs without proper sacrum (Protosirenidae) and reduced innominate with hindlimbs reduced or absent (Dugongidae and Trichechidae).

Since sirenians first evolved, they have been herbivores, likely depending on seagrasses and aquatic angiosperms (flowering plants) for food. To the present, almost all have remained tropical (with the notable exception of Steller's Sea Cow), marine and angiosperm consumers. Sea cows are shallow divers with large lungs. They have heavy skeletons to help them stay submerged; the bones are pachyostotic (swollen) and osteosclerotic (dense), especially the ribs which are often found as fossils.

Eocene sirenians, like Mesozoic mammals but in contrast to other Cenozoic ones, have five instead of four premolars, giving them a 3.1.5.3 dental formula. Whether this condition is truly a primitive retention in sirenians is still under debate.

Although cheek teeth are relied on for identifying species in other mammals, they do not vary to a significant degree among sirenians in their morphology, but are almost always low-crowned (brachyodont) with two rows of large, rounded cusps (bunobilophodont). The most easily identifiable parts of sirenian skeletons are the skull and mandible, especially the frontal and other skull bones. With the exception of a pair of tusk-like first upper incisors present in most species, front teeth (incisors and canines) are lacking in all, except the earliest sirenians.

== See also ==
- Evolution of cetaceans
