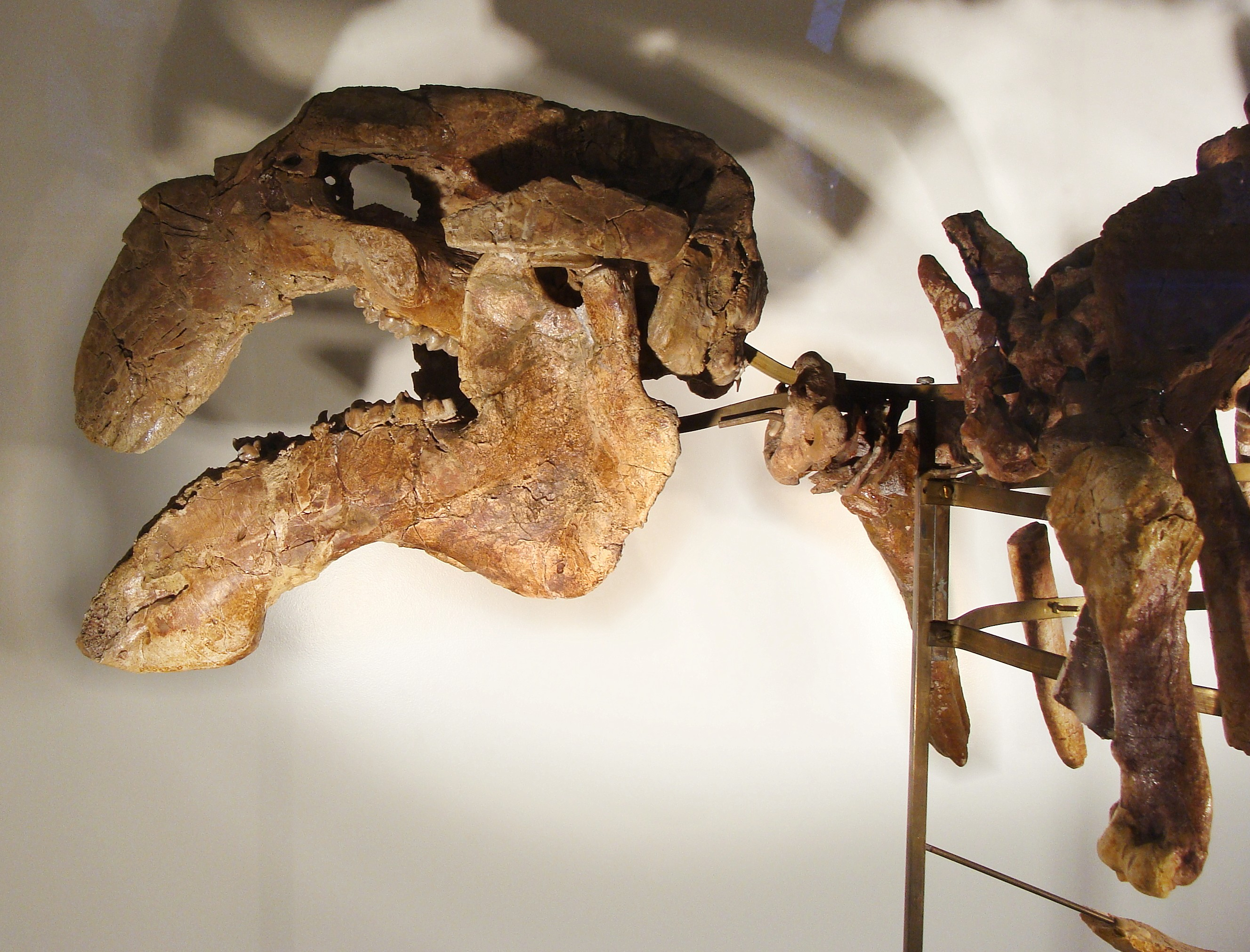
- Eotheroides sp. in Artis, Amsterdam.

Scientific classification
- Kingdom: Animalia
- Phylum: Chordata
- Class: Mammalia
- Order: Sirenia
- Family: Dugongidae
- Genus: †Eotheroides; Palmer, 1899

Species
- E. aegyptiacum (Owen, 1875) (type); E. babiae Bajpai et al., 2006; E. clavigerum Zalmout and Gingerich, 2012; E. lambondrano Samonds et al., 2009; E. majus Zdansky, 1938; E. sandersi Zalmout and Gingerich, 2012; E. waghapadarensis Das and Basu, 1994

= Eotheroides =

Eotheroides Temporal range: Middle - Late Eocene, 48.6–33.9 Ma

Extinct genus of Eocene sirenian

Eotheroides is an extinct genus of Eocene sirenian. It is an early member of the family Dugongidae, which includes the extant dugong. Fossils have been found from Egypt, India, and Madagascar. Eotheroides was first described by Richard Owen in 1875 under the name Eotherium, which was replaced by the current name in 1899.

Based on endocranial casts, Eotheroiodes had a smaller endocranial volume than other contemporaneous sirenians such as Protosiren. Unlike extant sirenians, Eotheroides possesses a tentorium cerebelli, which appears as a distinct transverse groove on the skull.

== Species ==
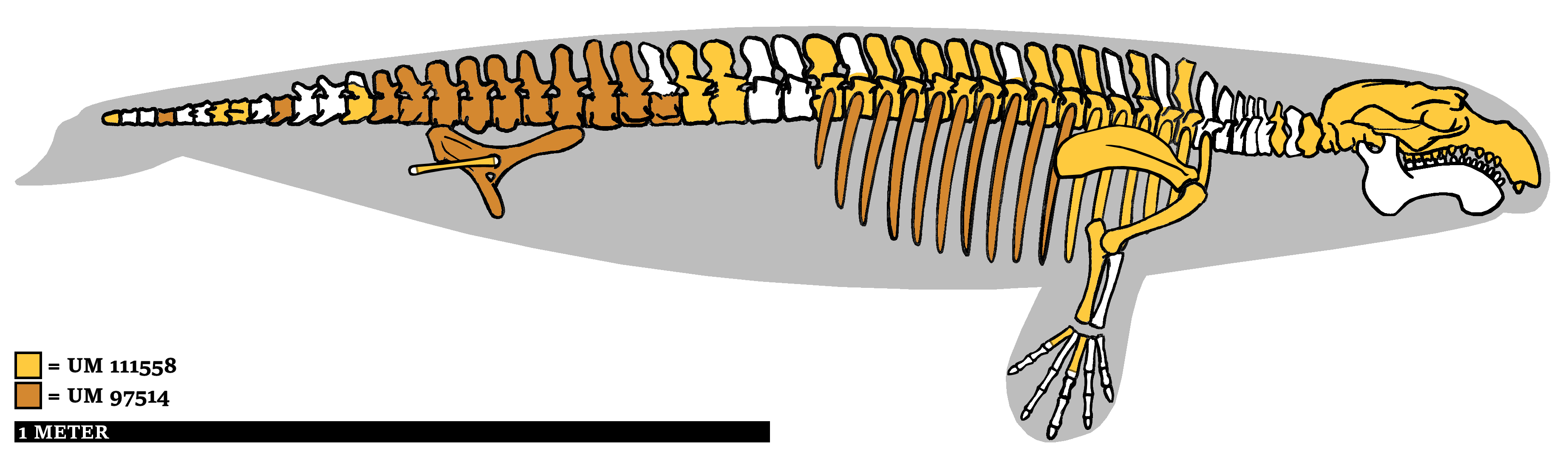
Drawing of skeleton from the species E. sandersi

The type species, E. aegyptiacum, is known from the Lutetian Mokattam Formation of Cairo, Egypt. Another species, E. lambondrano, was recently named on the basis of material found from Middle Eocene nearshore marine deposits in the Mahajanga Basin of Madagascar. The species was named after the Malagasy word for dugong, which translates as "water bushpig". It is known from a nearly complete skull and fragments of pachyosteosclerotic (thick) ribs. Based on its age and morphology, E. lambondrano may be ancestral to E. aegyptiacum. Described in 2009, E. lambondrano is the first pre-Pleistocene Cenozoic mammal named from Madagascar, being known from an 80-million-year gap in the island's fossil record.

Several other species have been named, including E. babiae from India, E. majus, E. clavigerum and E. sandersi from Egypt, and E. waghapadarensis, also from India. E. majus was based on a single upper molar, which was never catalogued and is now lost; it has been considered a senior subjective synonym of E. aegyptiacum.

== Paleobiology ==
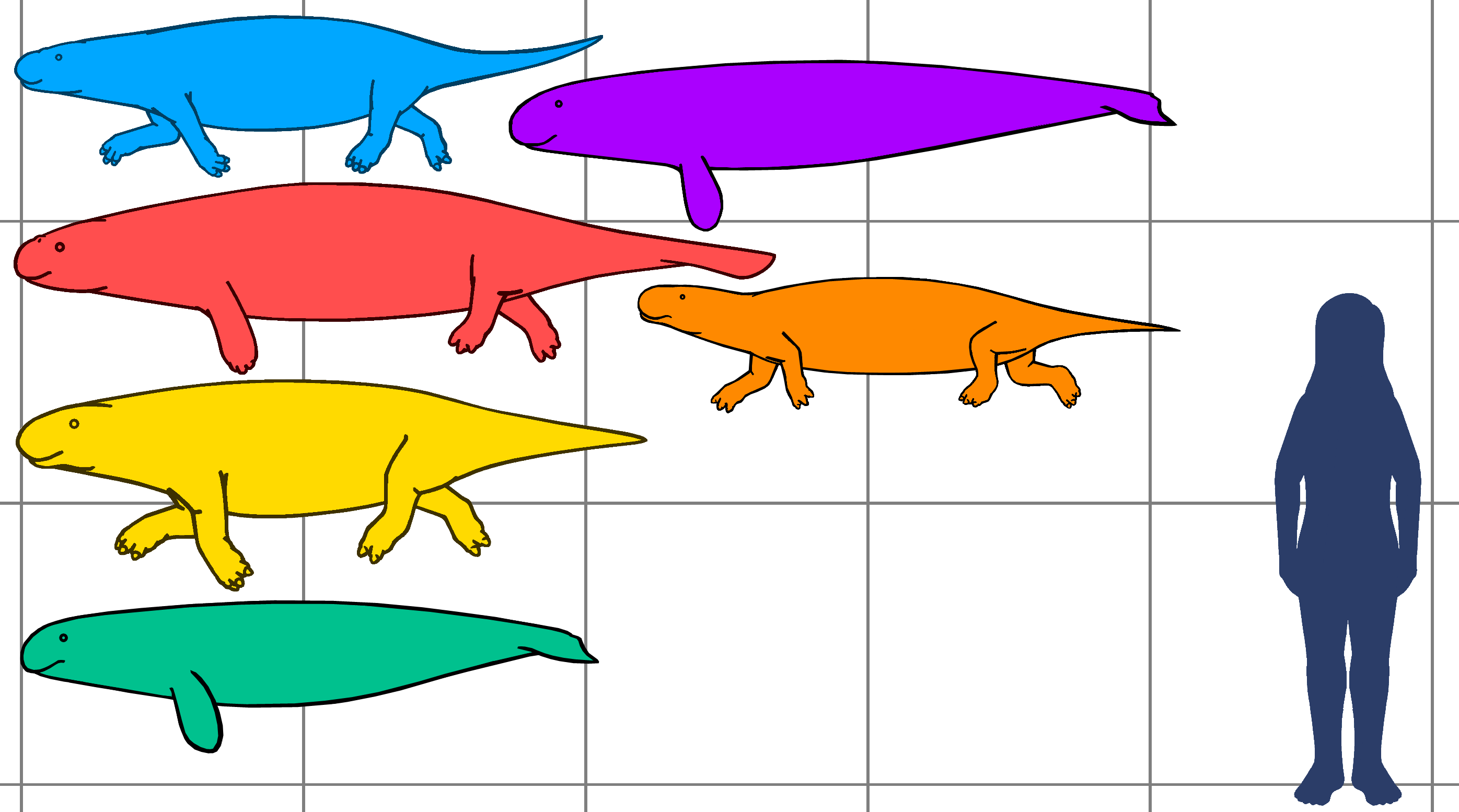
Drawing of swimming Eotheroides sandersi (green), compared to three other Eocene sirenian taxa.

The teeth of Eotheroides were relatively unspecialized compared to those of extant sirenians, which are reduced as an adaptation for feeding on sea grass. The upper molars of E. lambondrano are considerably longer and wider than those of E. aegyptiacum, suggesting that they were less specialized. Eotheroides is likely to have been one of the first fully aquatic sea cows. Eotheroides lambondrano was found in association with the remains of other sea cows, crocodilians, and sea turtles, which suggests that the locality is representative of a coastal or estuarine environment.
