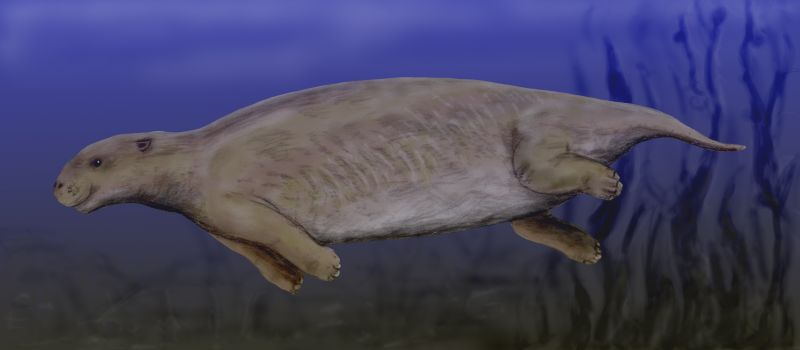
- Prorastomus sirenoides

Scientific classification
- Kingdom: Animalia
- Phylum: Chordata
- Class: Mammalia
- Order: Sirenia
- Family: †Prorastomidae

Genera
- †Pezosiren †Prorastomus

= Prorastomidae =

Prorastomidae Temporal range: Eocene

Extinct family of mammals

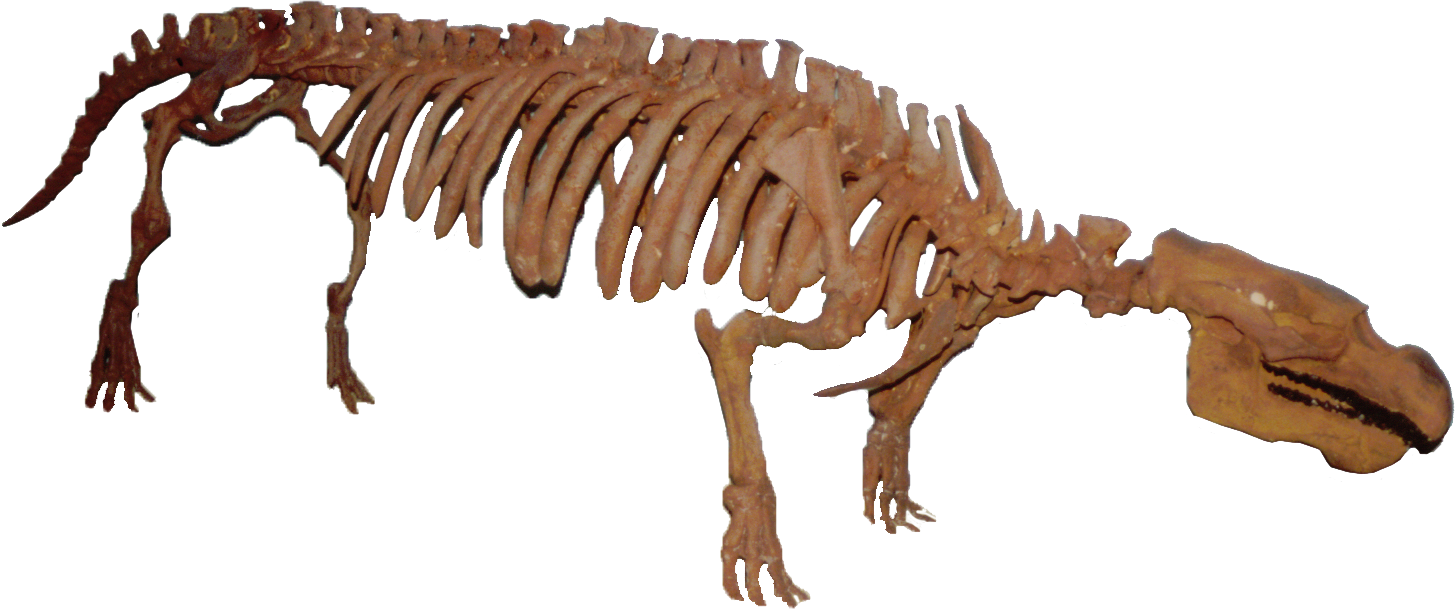
Pezosiren portelli cast skeleton

Prorastomidae is a family of extinct sirenians from Jamaica, related to the extant manatees and dugong. The family includes the oldest known fossils of Sirenians, represented in two genera:

- Pezosiren

Pezosiren comprises one known species, Pezosiren portelli, that was discovered in modern-day Jamaica. One of the earliest true Sirenian species, P. portelli is distinct from extant Sirenians due to its quadrupedal stature. The species is estimated to have lived 50 million years ago during the Mid Eocene, and the skeletal elements suggest that P. portelli was able to properly support its body weight while out of the water. However, several morphological features suggest that this species spent significant amounts of time in an aquatic environment, such as P. portelli's pachyosteosclerotic ribs. Similar to an extant manatee's ribs, these ribs provided a ballast and allowed the animal to achieve neutral buoyancy. P. portelli lacked the large, muscular tail used in modern Sirenians to propel through the water column, and skeletal anatomy suggests that they instead garnered propulsive force through spinal undulations, similar to otters. This evidence suggests that P. portelli likely divided its time between terrestrial habitats and shallow aquatic habitats, convergently akin to hippopotamuses.

- Prorastomus

The genus Prorastomus is also represented by only one known species. Prorastomus sirenoides lived in modern day Jamaica during the Mid Eocene, and it is thought to be the oldest Sirenian species discovered so far. Similar to P. portelli, this quadrupedal Sirenian likely displayed a lifestyle comparable to hippos, spending large amounts of time both in and out of water. The species was determined to have had relatively large olfactory bulbs for a Sirenian, suggesting that the sense of smell was of importance to P. sirenoides, and the trigeminal nerves, utilized in somatosensory, were found to be enlarged. Extant Sirenian species possess comparably large trigeminal nerves, allowing for highly sensitive facial tactility. Dentile fossils of P. sirenoides suggest that the species fed primarily on floating and emergent vegetation along its habitat.

== See also ==
- Evolution of sirenians
