= Libysiren =

Libysiren Temporal range: Middle Eocene

Scientific classification
- Kingdom: Animalia
- Phylum: Chordata
- Class: Mammalia
- Infraclass: Placentalia
- Order: Sirenia
- Family: †Protosirenidae
- Genus: †Libysiren
- Species: †L. sickenbergi

Binomial name
- †Libysiren sickenbergi Domning et al., 2017

Libysiren is an extinct genus of protosirenid sirenian that lived during the Lutetian stage of the Eocene epoch.

== Distribution ==
Libysiren sickenbergi is known from the Wadi Thamit Formation of Libya.
