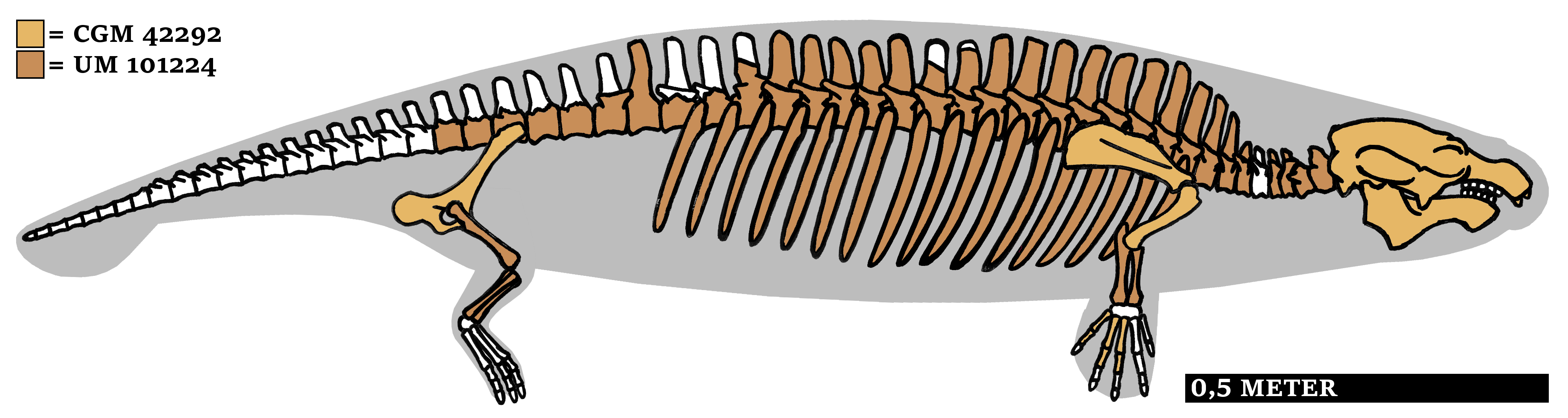
- The skeleton of Protosiren

Scientific classification
- Kingdom: Animalia
- Phylum: Chordata
- Class: Mammalia
- Order: Sirenia
- Family: †Protosirenidae; Sickenberg, 1934

Genera
- Ashokia; Dakhlasiren; Libysiren; Protosiren

= Protosirenidae =

Protosirenidae Temporal range: Middle Eocene–Late Eocene

Extinct family of aquatic mammals

Protosirenidae is an extinct primitive family of the order Sirenia.

Protosirenids are thought to have been amphibious quadrupeds, meaning that they spent their time both on land and in the water and had four legs.

== See also ==
- Dugongidae
- Evolution of sirenians
- Manatee
