= Pink lights =

Anti-loitering technology

Pink Lights a recognized anti-loitering technique from the United Kingdom that deters youths from loitering around public building by highlighting acne and skin blemishes with pink light. Since 2012, some towns in the United Kingdom have installed pink lighting around shops, and other areas where teenagers are seen as undesirable.

== See also ==
- The Mosquito
