= Later Life Workplace Index =

The Later Life Workplace Index (LLWI) serves as a measurement instrument for age-friendly organizational practices and working conditions for the successful employment of age-diverse and aging workforces. Especially in the light of demographic change and shortages of skilled workers, the employment of older workers gains importance. The index summarizes practices and working conditions that are beneficial for an older workforce by fostering their health, motivation, and performance. A corresponding questionnaire containing 80 items can be used to evaluate organizational practices on nine domains.

The index was developed at the chair of Professor Dr. Jürgen Deller at Leuphana University of Lüneburg. It emerged from a cooperation with the German Federal Institute for Occupational Safety and Health, the Demographie Netzwerk e.V., and the Goinger Kreis e.V.

== Objectives ==
The LLWI aims to identify organizational factors for the successful employment of older workers and make them measurable. Research regarding the index can help to understand the relative importance of individual organizational practices for the success and sustainability of the employment of older workers. Organizations are able to easily assess their working conditions for older workers and to identify areas for improvement. Hence the LLWI contributes to coping with demographic change and its consequences from an organizational perspective.

== Domains ==
The index covers the following nine domains:

Domain	Description
Organizational climate	The organizational climate domain includes the set standards and actions of an employer shaped by the mission and values of the organization. An organizational climate that fosters good management of employees just before and in retirement age especially promotes equal opportunities and a positive image for all age groups.
Leadership	The leadership domain includes the responsibility of organizational executives to harness the potential of employees at all ages and particularly just before and in retirement age. This is achieved through the consideration of each individual employee's strengths and by showing appreciation for their talents and contributions.
Work design	The work design domain includes the adaptation of work location, time and physical space to fit the individual needs and abilities of employees, relieve strain and increase job satisfaction and efficiency.
Health management	The health management domain includes all organizational activities that aim to maintain and promote employees' health and work ability. Health management should be characterized by a holistic approach addressing not only specific interventions but also health-promoting work design and leadership.
Individual development	Employees should be supported in their professional and personal development during their entire work life. A special emphasis is put on the importance of lifelong learning through continued education and training. There should also be opportunities for career development through internal advancement and promotions.
Knowledge management	The knowledge management domain includes procedures for the transfer, exchange, and conservation of knowledge between different generations of employees.
Transition to retirement	The transition into retirement domain includes the necessary conversations, planning, and workplace solutions for any employee who is on the verge of retiring. Information and counseling should be provided to help the employee transition.
Continued employment	The continued employment domain includes the organizational design and employment options for employees at retirement age. This includes former employees of the organization as well as external employees looking for continued employment.
Health and retirement coverage	Organizations should support their employees with retirement savings and insurance coverage, if not sufficiently provided by public systems. Requirements vary due to different regulations and social systems. The support may be a direct financial benefit or put into practice as individual planning and assistance.

== Development ==
The LLWI is based on extensive qualitative as well as quantitative research. Within the first development phase, the model was derived from expert interviews in Germany and business analyses in the U.S. to form the Silver Work Index (SWI). Subsequently, the index was operationalized into a questionnaire and its reliability as well as validity were checked in several studies in Germany. In cooperation with international scientists, the LLWI is currently being translated into other languages. An English-language version of the LLWI for the United States was published in 2023. Over the course of the operationalization and internationalization, the former Silver Work Index was renamed Later Life Workplace Index.

The LLWI can be considered as an extension of the Active Ageing Index (AAI), which is a joint project of the UNECE Population Unit, the European Commission Directorate General for Employment, Social Affairs and Inclusion as well as the European Centre for Social Welfare Policy and Research. The AAI measures the extent to which older people live independently and participate in economic as well as social activities to identify untapped potential for actively ageing societies. This macro level analysis is being complemented on organizational meso level by the LLWI.

In 2025, the short form of the measure (LLWI-SF) was published in ten languages. Finsel et al. reduced the original 80 questions to 29 questions and validated the LLWI-SF in an empirical study. The language versions can be used in Belgium (Flemish), Germany, Italy, Japan, South Korea, the Netherlands, Norway, Poland, Portugal and the United States.
