= Marine mammal =

Mammals that rely on marine environments for feeding

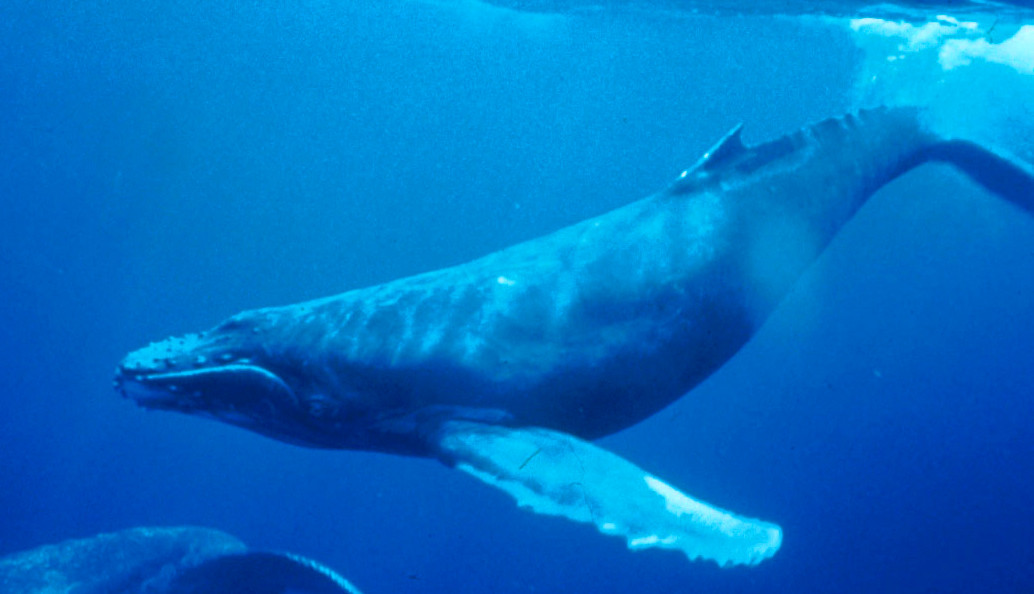
A humpback whale (Megaptera novaeangliae)

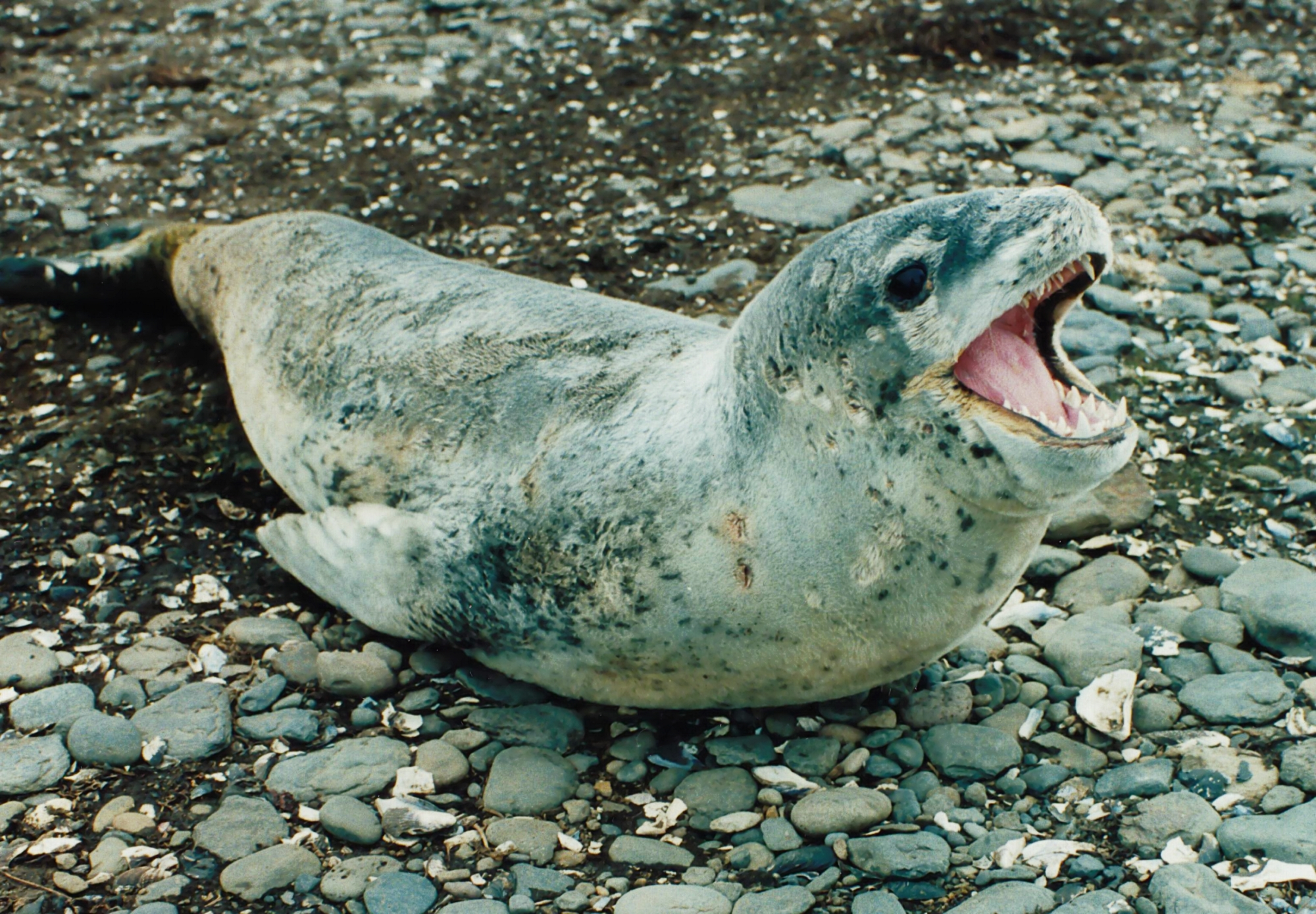
A leopard seal (Hydrurga leptonyx)

Marine mammals are mammals that rely on marine ecosystems for their existence. They include animals such as cetaceans, pinnipeds, sirenians, marine otters, sea otters and polar bears. They are an informal group, unified only by their reliance on marine environments for feeding and survival.

Marine mammal adaptation to an aquatic lifestyle varies considerably between species. Both cetaceans and sirenians are fully aquatic and therefore are obligate water dwellers. Pinnipeds are semiaquatic; they spend the majority of their time in the water but need to return to land for important activities such as mating, breeding and molting. Sea otters tend to live in kelp forests and estuaries. In contrast, the polar bear is mostly terrestrial and only goes into the water on occasions of necessity, and are thus much less adapted to aquatic living. The diets of marine mammals vary considerably as well; some eat zooplankton, others eat fish, squid, shellfish, or seagrass, and a few eat other mammals. While the number of marine mammals is small compared to those found on land, their roles in various ecosystems are large, especially concerning the maintenance of marine ecosystems, through processes including the regulation of prey populations. This role in maintaining ecosystems makes them of particular concern as 23% of marine mammal species are currently threatened.

Marine mammals were first hunted by aboriginal peoples for food and other resources. Many were also the target for commercial industry, leading to a sharp decline in all populations of exploited species, such as whales and seals. Commercial hunting led to the extinction of the Steller's sea cow, sea mink, Japanese sea lion and Caribbean monk seal, and possibly the Baiji. After commercial hunting ended, some species, such as the gray whale and northern elephant seal, have rebounded in numbers; conversely, other species, such as the North Atlantic right whale, are critically endangered. Other than being hunted, marine mammals can be killed as bycatch from fisheries, where for example they can become entangled in nets and drown or starve. Increased ocean traffic causes collisions between fast ocean vessels and large marine mammals. Habitat degradation also threatens marine mammals and their ability to find and catch food. Noise pollution, for example, may adversely affect echolocating mammals, and the ongoing effects of global warming degrade Arctic environments.

== Taxonomy ==
Marine mammals of varying sizes and shapes

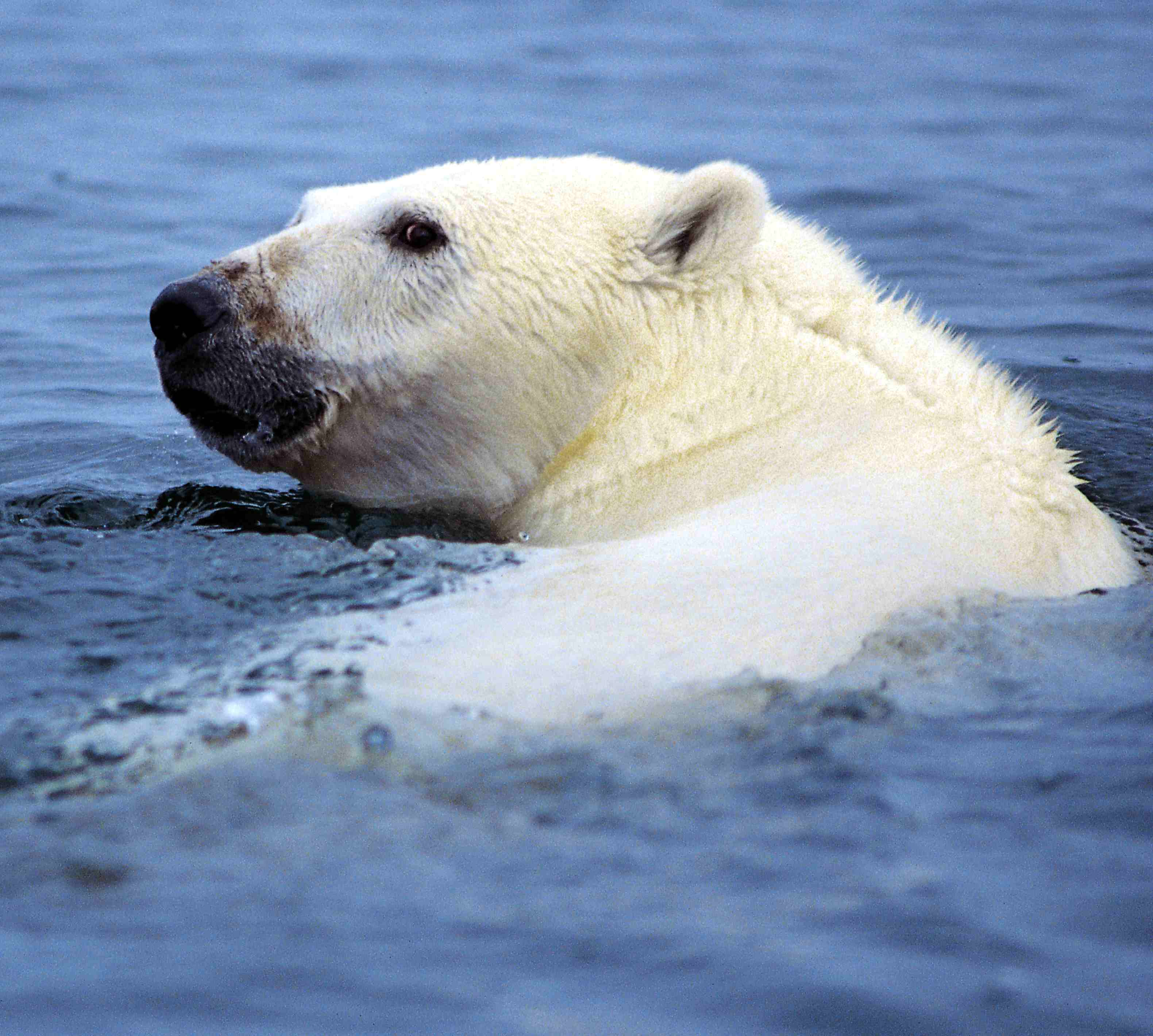
A polar bear (Ursus maritimus), a member of family Ursidae

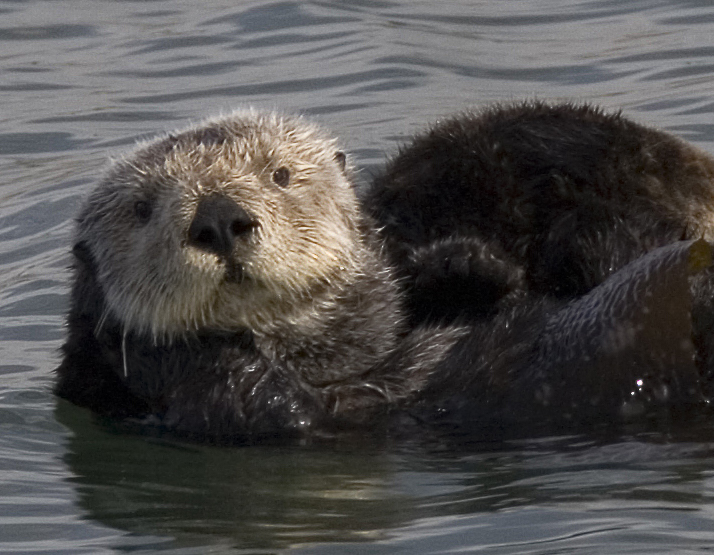
A sea otter (Enhydra lutris), a member of family Mustelidae

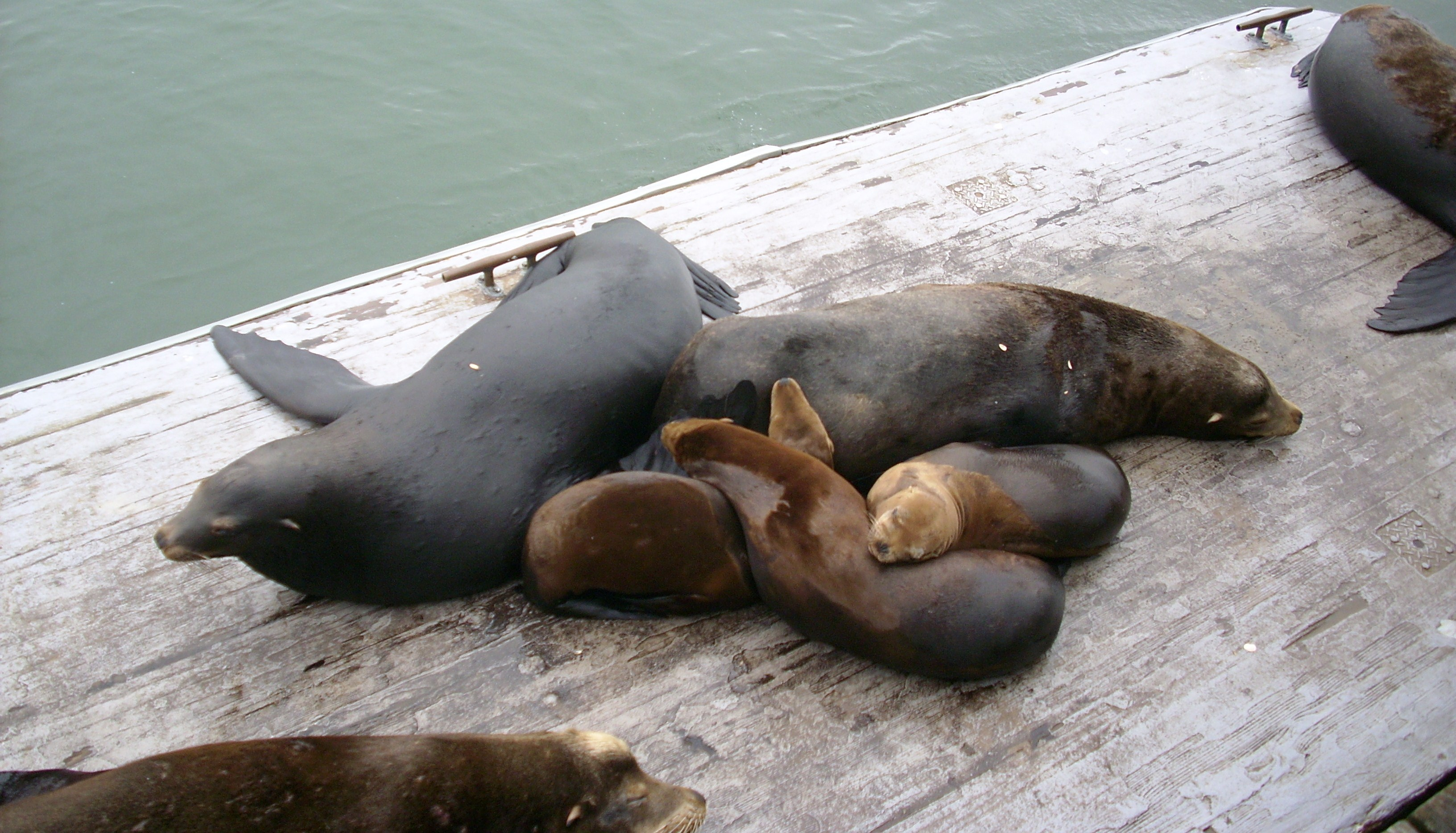
California sea lions (Zalophus californianus), members of the family Otariidae

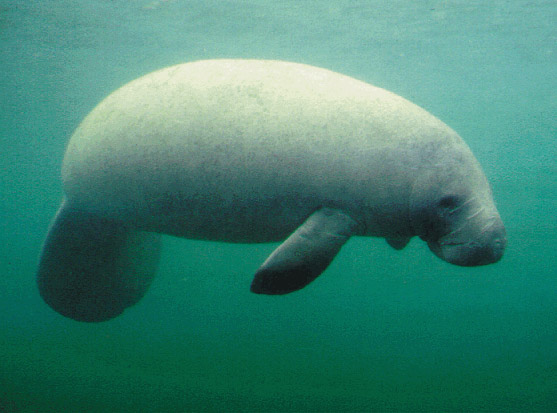
A West Indian manatee (Trichechus manatus), a member of order Sirenia

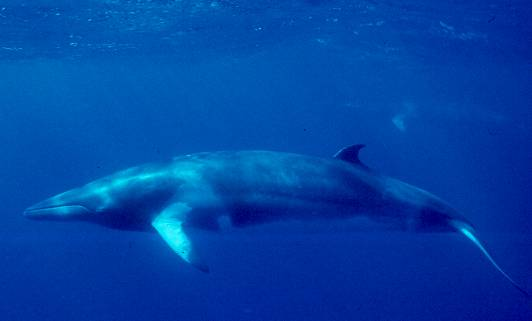
A common minke whale (Balaenoptera acutorostrata), a member of the order Cetartiodactyla

=== Classification of extant species ===
Phylogeny of marine mammals

- Mammalia
  - Afrotheria
    - Hyracoidea
      Procaviidae
    - Tethytheria
      - Proboscidea
        Elephantidae
      - **Sirenia**
        - **Dugongidae** (dugongs)
        - **Trichechidae**
          - **Trichechus manatus** (West Indian manatee)
          - **Trichechus senegalensis** (African manatee)
          - Trichechus inunguis (Amazonian manatee; freshwater species)
  - Laurasiatheria
    - Euungulata
      - - Cetartiodactyla
          - Whippomorpha
            - Hippopotamidae
            - **Cetacea**
              - **Mysticeti** (baleen whales)
              - **Odontoceti** (toothed whales, except river dolphins)
          - Ruminantia
      - Perissodactyla
    - Ferae
      - Pholidota
      - Carnivora
        - - Feliformia
          - Caniformia
            - - Canidae
              - Arctoidea
                - Ursidae
                  - **Ursus maritimus** (polar bear)
                  - all other ursids
                - - Mustelidae
                    - **Enhydra lutris** (sea otter)
                    - **Lontra felina** (marine otter)
                    - **†Neogale macrodon** (sea mink)
                    - all other mustelids
                  - **Pinnipedia**
                    - **Otariidae** (eared seals)
                    - **Odobenidae** (walruses)
                    - **Phocidae** (earless seals)

The taxa in bold are marine. Taxa indicated with a † symbol are recently extinct.

- Order Cetartiodactyla
  - Suborder Whippomorpha
    - Family Balaenidae (right and bowhead whales), two genera and four species
    - Family Cetotheriidae (pygmy right whale), one genus and two species
    - Family Balaenopteridae (rorquals), two genera and nine species
    - Family Eschrichtiidae (gray whale), one species
    - Family Physeteridae (sperm whale), one species
    - Family Kogiidae (pygmy and dwarf sperm whales), one genus and two species
    - Family Monodontidae (narwhal and beluga), two genera and two species
    - Family Ziphiidae (beaked whales), six genera and 24 species
    - Family Delphinidae (oceanic dolphins), 17 genera and 38 species
    - Family Phocoenidae (porpoises), two genera and seven species
    - Family Iniidae (New world river dolphins), one genus and three species
    - Family Platanistidae (South Asian river dolphins), one genus and two species
    - Family Pontoporiidae (La Plata dolphin), one species
- Order Sirenia (sea cows)
    - Family Trichechidae (manatees), three species
    - Family Dugongidae (dugongs), one species
- Order Carnivora (carnivorans)
  - Suborder Caniformia
    - Family Mustelidae, two species
    - Family Ursidae (bears), one species
    - Infraorder Pinnipedia (sealions, walruses, seals)
      - Family Otariidae (eared seals), seven genera and 15 species
      - Family Odobenidae (walrus), one species
      - Family Phocidae (earless seals), 14 genera and 18 species

The term "marine mammal" encompasses all mammals whose survival depends entirely or almost entirely on the oceans, which have also evolved several specialized aquatic traits. In addition to the above, several other mammals have a great dependency on the sea without having become so anatomically specialized, otherwise known as "quasi-marine mammals". This term can include: the greater bulldog bat (Noctilio leporinus), the fish-eating bat (Myotis vivesi), the arctic fox (Vulpes lagopus) which often scavenges polar bear kills, coastal gray wolf (Canis lupus) populations which predominantly eat salmon and marine carcasses, the North Ronaldsay sheep (Ovis aries) which normally eats seaweed outside the lambing season, the Eurasian otter (Lutra lutra) which is usually found in freshwater but can be found along coastal Scotland, and others.

=== Evolution ===
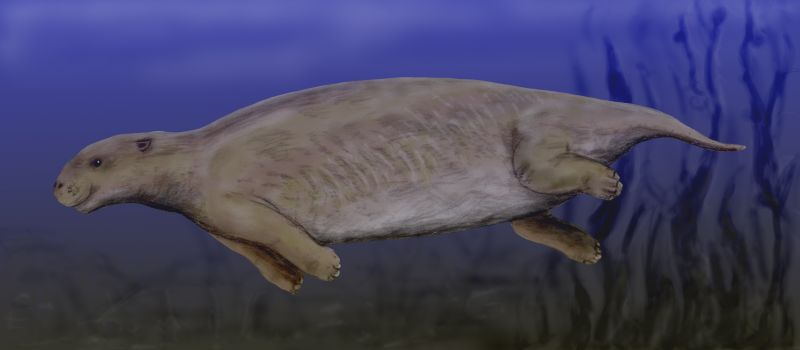
Illustration of †Prorastomus, an early sirenian (40 mya)

Marine mammals form a diverse group of 129 species that rely on the ocean for their existence. They are an informal group unified only by their reliance on marine environments for feeding. Despite the diversity in anatomy seen between groups, improved foraging efficiency has been the main driver in their evolution. The level of dependence on the marine environment varies considerably with species. For example, dolphins and whales are completely dependent on the marine environment for all stages of their life; seals feed in the ocean but breed on land; and polar bears must feed on land.

The cetaceans became aquatic around 50 million years ago (mya). Based on molecular and morphological research, the cetaceans genetically and morphologically fall firmly within the Artiodactyla (even-toed ungulates). The term "Cetartiodactyla" reflects the idea that whales evolved within the ungulates. The term was coined by merging the name for the two orders, Cetacea and Artiodactyla, into a single word. Under this definition, the closest living land relative of the whales and dolphins is thought to be the hippopotamuses.

Sirenians, the sea cows, became aquatic around 40 million years ago. The first appearance of sirenians in the fossil record was during the early Eocene, and by the late Eocene, sirenians had significantly diversified. Inhabitants of rivers, estuaries, and nearshore marine waters, they were able to spread rapidly. The most primitive sirenian, †Prorastomus, was found in Jamaica, unlike other marine mammals which originated from the Old World (such as cetaceans). The first known quadrupedal sirenian was †Pezosiren from the early middle Eocene. The earliest known sea cows, of the families †Prorastomidae and †Protosirenidae, were both confined to the Eocene, and were pig-sized, four-legged, amphibious creatures. The first members of Dugongidae appeared by the middle Eocene. At this point, sea cows were fully aquatic.

Pinnipeds split from other caniforms 50 mya during the Eocene. Their evolutionary link to terrestrial mammals was unknown until the 2007 discovery of †Puijila darwini in early Miocene deposits in Nunavut, Canada. Like a modern otter, †Puijila had a long tail, short limbs and webbed feet instead of flippers. The lineages of Otariidae (eared seals) and Odobenidae (walrus) split almost 28 mya. Phocids (earless seals) are known to have existed for at least 15 mya, and molecular evidence supports a divergence of the Monachinae (monk seals) and Phocinae lineages 22 mya.

Fossil evidence indicates the sea otter (Enhydra) lineage became isolated in the North Pacific approximately two mya, giving rise to the now-extinct †Enhydra macrodonta and the modern sea otter, Enhydra lutris. The sea otter evolved initially in northern Hokkaidō and Russia, and then spread east to the Aleutian Islands, mainland Alaska, and down the North American coast. In comparison to cetaceans, sirenians, and pinnipeds, which entered the water approximately 50, 40, and 20 mya, respectively, the sea otter is a relative newcomer to marine life. In some respects though, the sea otter is more fully adapted to water than pinnipeds, which must haul out on land or ice to give birth.

Polar bears are thought to have diverged from a population of brown bears, Ursus arctos, that became isolated during a period of glaciation in the Pleistocene or from the eastern part of Siberia, (from Kamchatka and the Kolym Peninsula). The oldest known polar bear fossil is a 130,000-to-110,000-year-old jaw bone, found on Prince Charles Foreland in 2004. The mitochondrial DNA (mtDNA) of the polar bear diverged from the brown bear roughly 150,000 years ago. Further, some clades of brown bear, as assessed by their mtDNA, are more closely related to polar bears than to other brown bears, meaning that the polar bear might not be considered a species under some species concepts.

In general, terrestrial amniote invasions of the sea have become more frequent in the Cenozoic than they were in the Mesozoic. Factors contributing to this trend include the increasing productivity of near-shore marine environments, and the role of endothermy in facilitating this transition.

== Distribution and habitat ==
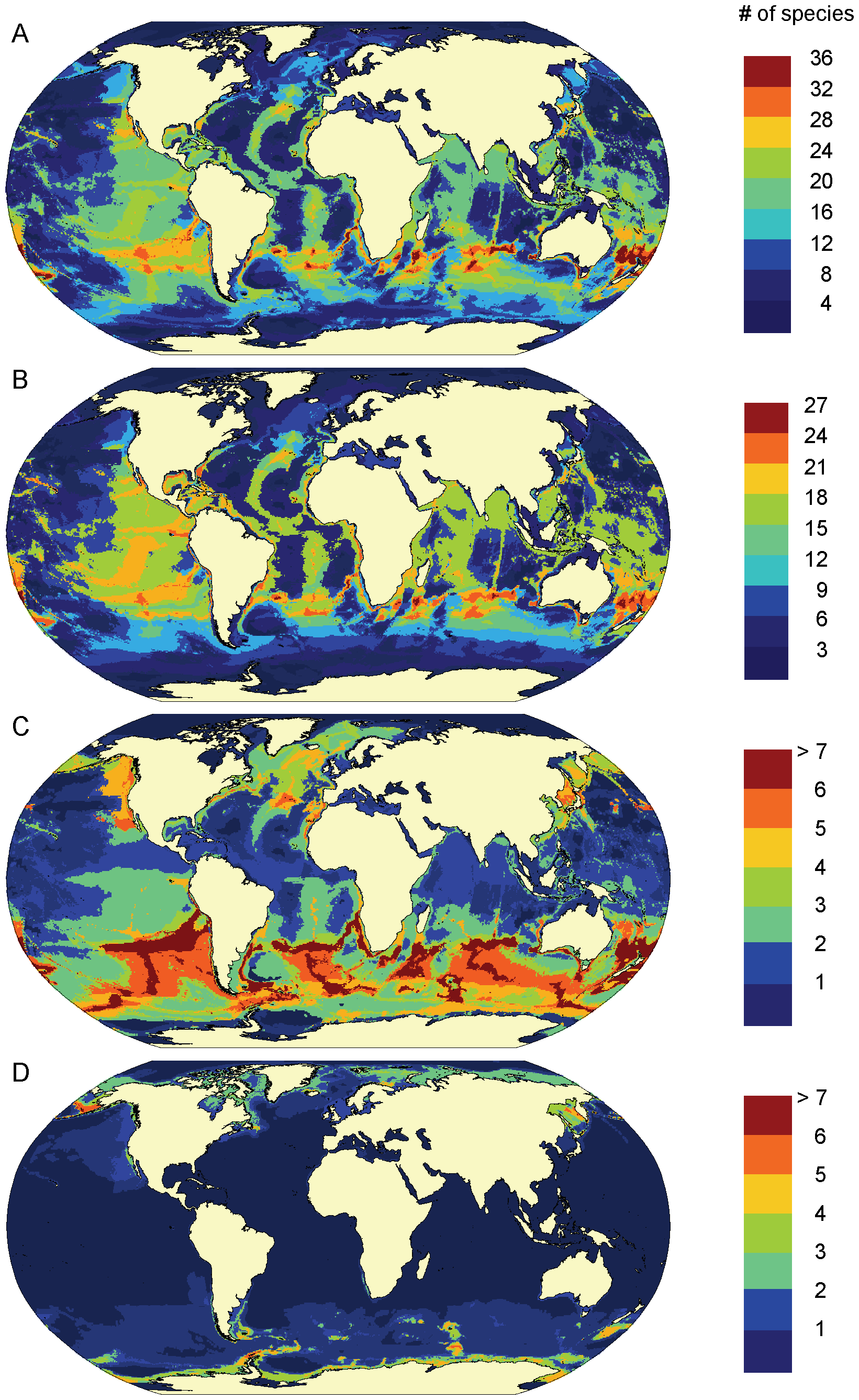
Marine mammal species richness: A) All species (n = 115), B) toothed whales (n = 69), C) baleen whales (n = 14), D) seals (n = 32), based on data from 1990 to 1999

Marine mammals are widely distributed throughout the globe, but their distribution is patchy and coincides with the productivity of the oceans. Species richness peaks at around 40° latitude, both north and south. This corresponds to the highest levels of primary production around North and South America, Africa, Asia and Australia. Total species range is highly variable for marine mammal species. On average most marine mammals have ranges which are equivalent or smaller than one-fifth of the Indian Ocean. The variation observed in range size is a result of the different ecological requirements of each species and their ability to cope with a broad range of environmental conditions. The high degree of overlap between marine mammal species richness and areas of human impact on the environment is of concern.

Most marine mammals, such as seals and sea otters, inhabit the coast. Seals, however, also use a number of terrestrial habitats, both continental and island. In temperate and tropical areas, they haul-out on to sandy and pebble beaches, rocky shores, shoals, mud flats, tide pools and in sea caves. Some species also rest on man-made structures, like piers, jetties, buoys and oil platforms. Seals may move further inland and rest in sand dunes or vegetation, and may even climb cliffs. Most cetaceans live in the open ocean, and species like the sperm whale may dive to depths of −1,000 to −2,500 feet (−300 to −760 m) in search of food. Sirenians live in shallow coastal waters, usually living 30 feet (9.1 m) below sea level. However, they have been known to dive to −120 feet (−37 m) to forage deep-water seagrasses. Sea otters live in protected areas, such as rocky shores, kelp forests, and barrier reefs, although they may reside among drift ice or in sandy, muddy, or silty areas.

Many marine mammals seasonally migrate. Annual ice contains areas of water that appear and disappear throughout the year as the weather changes, and seals migrate in response to these changes. In turn, polar bears must follow their prey. In Hudson Bay, James Bay, and some other areas, the ice melts completely each summer (an event often referred to as "ice-floe breakup"), forcing polar bears to go onto land and wait through the months until the next freeze-up. In the Chukchi and Beaufort seas, polar bears retreat each summer to the ice further north that remains frozen year-round. Seals may also migrate to other environmental changes, such as El Niño, and traveling seals may use various features of their environment to reach their destination including geomagnetic fields, water and wind currents, the position of the sun and moon and the taste and temperature of the water. Baleen whales famously migrate very long distances into tropical waters to give birth and raise young, possibly to prevent predation by killer whales. The gray whale has the longest recorded migration of any mammal, with one traveling 14,000 miles (23,000 km) from the Sea of Okhotsk to the Baja Peninsula. During the winter, manatees living at the northern end of their range migrate to warmer waters.

== Adaptations ==
The labelled, anatomy of a dolphin showing its skeleton, major organs, and shape of the body

Marine mammals have a number of physiological and anatomical features to overcome the unique challenges associated with aquatic living. Some of these features are very species-specific. Marine mammals have developed a number of features for efficient locomotion such as torpedo-shaped bodies to reduce drag; modified limbs for propulsion and steering; tail flukes and dorsal fins for propulsion and balance. Marine mammals are adept at thermoregulation using dense fur or blubber, circulatory adjustments (counter-current heat exchange); and reduced appendages, and large size to prevent heat loss.

Marine mammals are able to dive for long periods. Both pinnipeds and cetaceans have large and complex blood vessel systems pushing large volumes of blood rich in myoglobin and hemoglobin, which serve to store greater quantities of oxygen. Other important reservoirs include muscles and the spleen which all have the capacity to hold a high concentration of oxygen. They are also capable of bradycardia (reduced heart rate), and vasoconstriction (shunting most of the oxygen to vital organs such as the brain and heart) to allow extended diving times and cope with oxygen deprivation. If oxygen is depleted (hypoxia), marine mammals can access substantial reservoirs of glycogen that support anaerobic glycolysis.

Sound travels differently through water, and therefore marine mammals have developed adaptations to ensure effective communication, prey capture, and predator detection. The most notable adaptation is the development of echolocation in whales and dolphins. Toothed whales emit a focused beam of high-frequency clicks in the direction that their head is pointing. Sounds are generated by passing air from the bony nares through the phonic lips. These sounds are reflected by the dense concave bone of the cranium and an air sac at its base. The focused beam is modulated by a large fatty organ known as the 'melon'. This acts like an acoustic lens because it is composed of lipids of differing densities.

Marine mammals have evolved a wide variety of features for feeding, which are mainly seen in their dentition. For example, the cheek teeth of pinnipeds and odontocetes are specifically adapted to capture fish and squid. In contrast, baleen whales have evolved baleen plates to filter feed plankton and small fish from the water.

Polar bears, otters, and fur seals have long, oily, and waterproof fur in order to trap air to provide insulation. In contrast, other marine mammals—such as whales, dolphins, porpoises, manatees, dugongs, and walruses—have lost long fur in favor of a thick, dense epidermis and a thickened fat layer (blubber) to prevent drag. Wading and bottom-feeding animals (such as manatees) need to be heavier than water in order to keep contact with the floor or to stay submerged. Surface-living animals (such as sea otters) need the opposite, and free-swimming animals living in open waters (such as dolphins) need to be neutrally buoyant in order to be able to swim up and down the water column. Typically, thick and dense bone is found in bottom feeders and low bone density is associated with mammals living in deep water. Some marine mammals, such as polar bears and otters, have retained four weight-bearing limbs and can walk on land like fully terrestrial animals.

== Ecology ==
=== Dietary ===
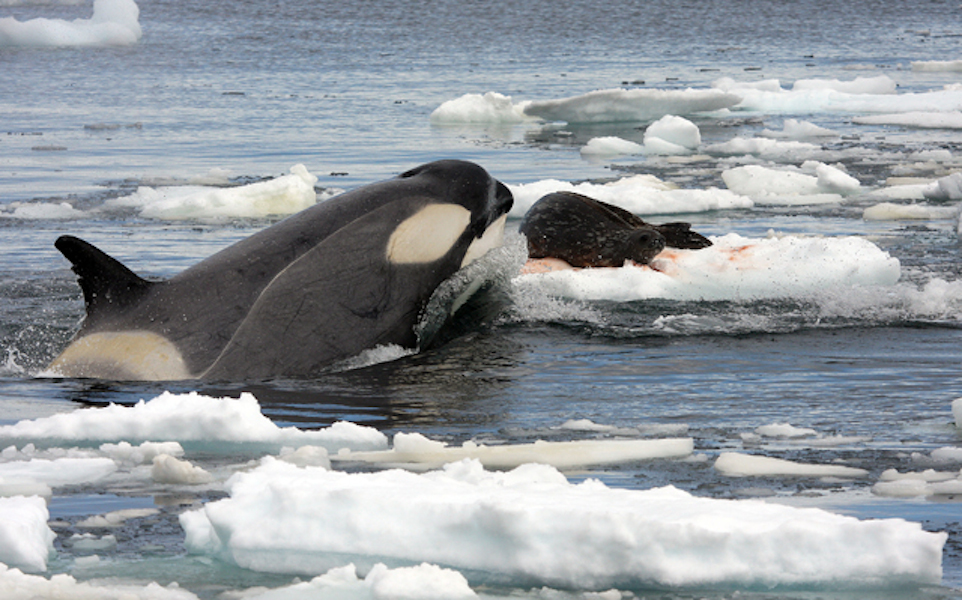
An orca hunting a Weddel seal

All cetaceans are carnivorous and predatory. Toothed whales mostly feed on fish and cephalopods, followed by crustaceans and bivalves. Some may forage with other kinds of animals, such as other species of whales or certain species of pinnipeds. One common feeding method is herding, where a pod squeezes a school of fish into a small volume, known as a bait ball. Individual members then take turns plowing through the ball, feeding on the stunned fish. Coralling is a method where dolphins chase fish into shallow water to catch them more easily. Orcas and bottlenose dolphins have also been known to drive their prey onto a beach to feed on it. Killer whales have been known to paralyze great white sharks and other sharks and rays by flipping them upside down. Other whales with a blunt snout and reduced dentition rely on suction feeding. Though carnivorous, they house gut flora similar to that of terrestrial herbivores, probably a remnant of their herbivorous ancestry.

Baleen whales use their baleen plates to sieve plankton, among others, out of the water; there are two types of methods: lunge-feeding and gulp-feeding. Lunge-feeders expand the volume of their jaw to a volume bigger than the original volume of the whale itself by inflating their mouth. This causes grooves on their throat to expand, increasing the amount of water the mouth can store. They ram a baitball at high speeds in order to feed, but this is only energy-effective when used against a large baitball. Gulp-feeders swim with an open mouth, filling it with water and prey. Prey must occur in sufficient numbers to trigger the whale's interest, be within a certain size range so that the baleen plates can filter it, and be slow enough so that it cannot escape.

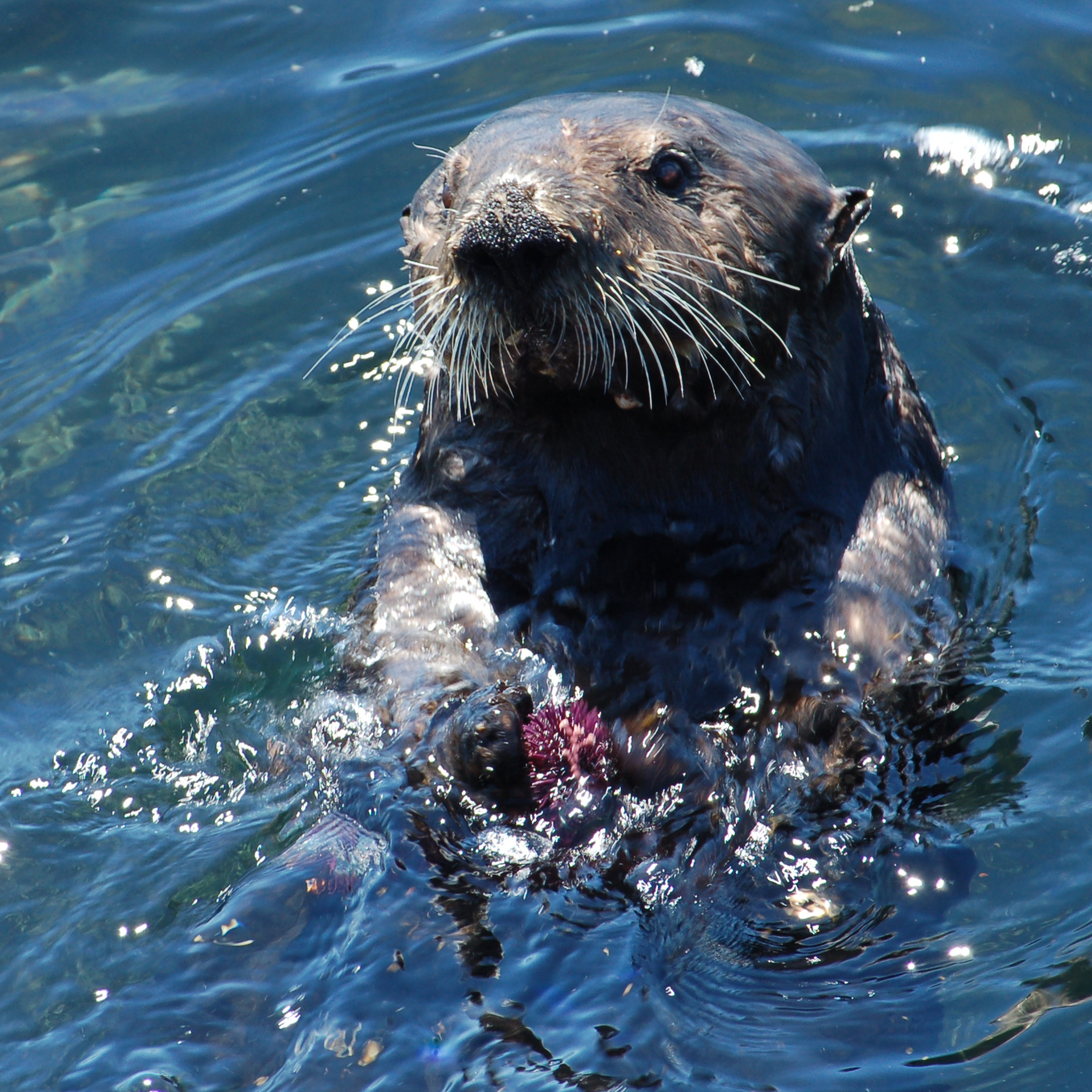
Sea otters have dexterous hands which they use to smash sea urchins off rocks

Otters are the only marine animals that are capable of lifting and turning over rocks, which they often do with their front paws when searching for prey. The sea otter may pluck snails and other organisms from kelp and dig deep into underwater mud for clams. It is the only marine mammal that catches fish with its forepaws rather than with its teeth. Under each foreleg, sea otters have a loose pouch of skin that extends across the chest which they use to store collected food to bring to the surface. This pouch also holds a rock that is used to break open shellfish and clams, an example of tool use. The sea otters eat while floating on their backs, using their forepaws to tear food apart and bring to their mouths. Marine otters mainly feed on crustaceans and fish.

Pinnipeds mostly feed on fish and cephalopods, followed by crustaceans and bivalves, and then zooplankton and warm-blooded prey (like sea birds). Most species are generalist feeders, but a few are specialists. They typically hunt non-schooling fish, slow-moving or immobile invertebrates or endothermic prey when in groups. Solitary foraging species usually exploit coastal waters, bays and rivers. When large schools of fish or squid are available, pinnipeds hunt cooperatively in large groups, locating and herding their prey. Some species, such as California and South American sea lions, may forage with cetaceans and sea birds.

The polar bear is the most carnivorous species of bear, and its diet primarily consists of ringed (Pusa hispida) and bearded (Erignathus barbatus) seals. Polar bears hunt primarily at the interface between ice, water, and air; they only rarely catch seals on land or in open water. The polar bear's most common hunting method is still-hunting: The bear locates a seal breathing hole using its sense of smell, and crouches nearby for a seal to appear. When the seal exhales, the bear smells its breath, reaches into the hole with a forepaw, and drags it out onto the ice. The polar bear also hunts by stalking seals resting on the ice. Upon spotting a seal, it walks to within 100 yards (90 m), and then crouches. If the seal does not notice, the bear creeps to within 30 to 40 feet (9 to 10 m) of the seal and then suddenly rushes to attack. A third hunting method is to raid the birth lairs that female seals create in the snow. They may also feed on fish.

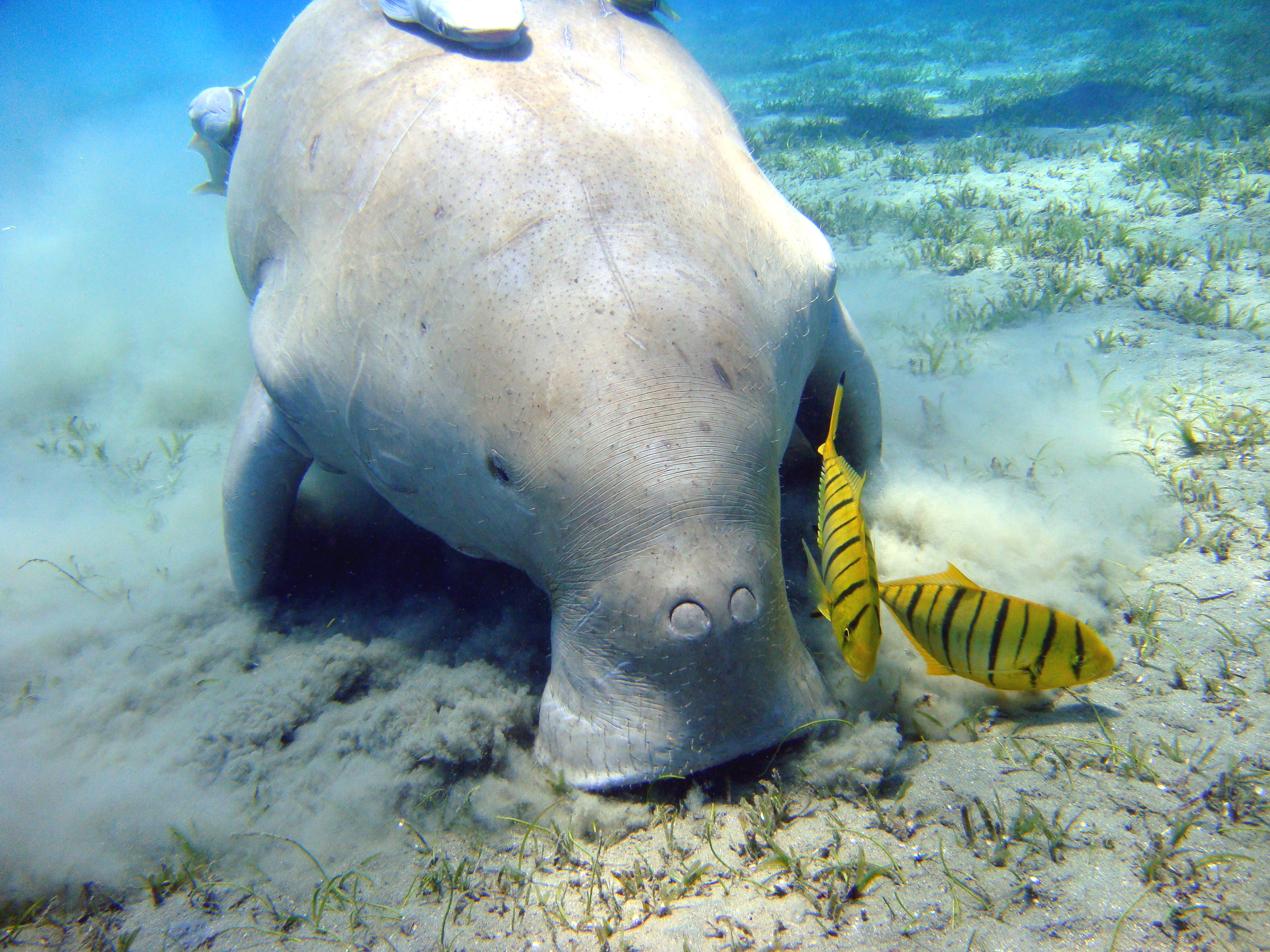
A dugong feeding on the sea-floor

Sirenians are referred to as "sea cows" because their diet consists mainly of seagrass. When eating, they ingest the whole plant, including the roots, although when this is impossible they feed on just the leaves. A wide variety of seagrass has been found in dugong stomach contents, and evidence exists they will eat algae when seagrass is scarce. West Indian manatees eat up to 60 different species of plants, as well as fish and small invertebrates to a lesser extent.

=== Keystone species ===
Sea otters are a classic example of a keystone species; their presence affects the ecosystem more profoundly than their size and numbers would suggest. They keep the population of certain benthic (sea floor) herbivores, particularly sea urchins, in check. Sea urchins graze on the lower stems of kelp, causing the kelp to drift away and die. Loss of the habitat and nutrients provided by kelp forests leads to profound cascade effects on the marine ecosystem. North Pacific areas that do not have sea otters often turn into urchin barrens, with abundant sea urchins and no kelp forest. Reintroduction of sea otters to British Columbia has led to a dramatic improvement in the health of coastal ecosystems, and similar changes have been observed as sea otter populations recovered in the Aleutian and Commander Islands and the Big Sur coast of California. However, some kelp forest ecosystems in California have also thrived without sea otters, with sea urchin populations apparently controlled by other factors. The role of sea otters in maintaining kelp forests has been observed to be more important in areas of open coast than in more protected bays and estuaries.

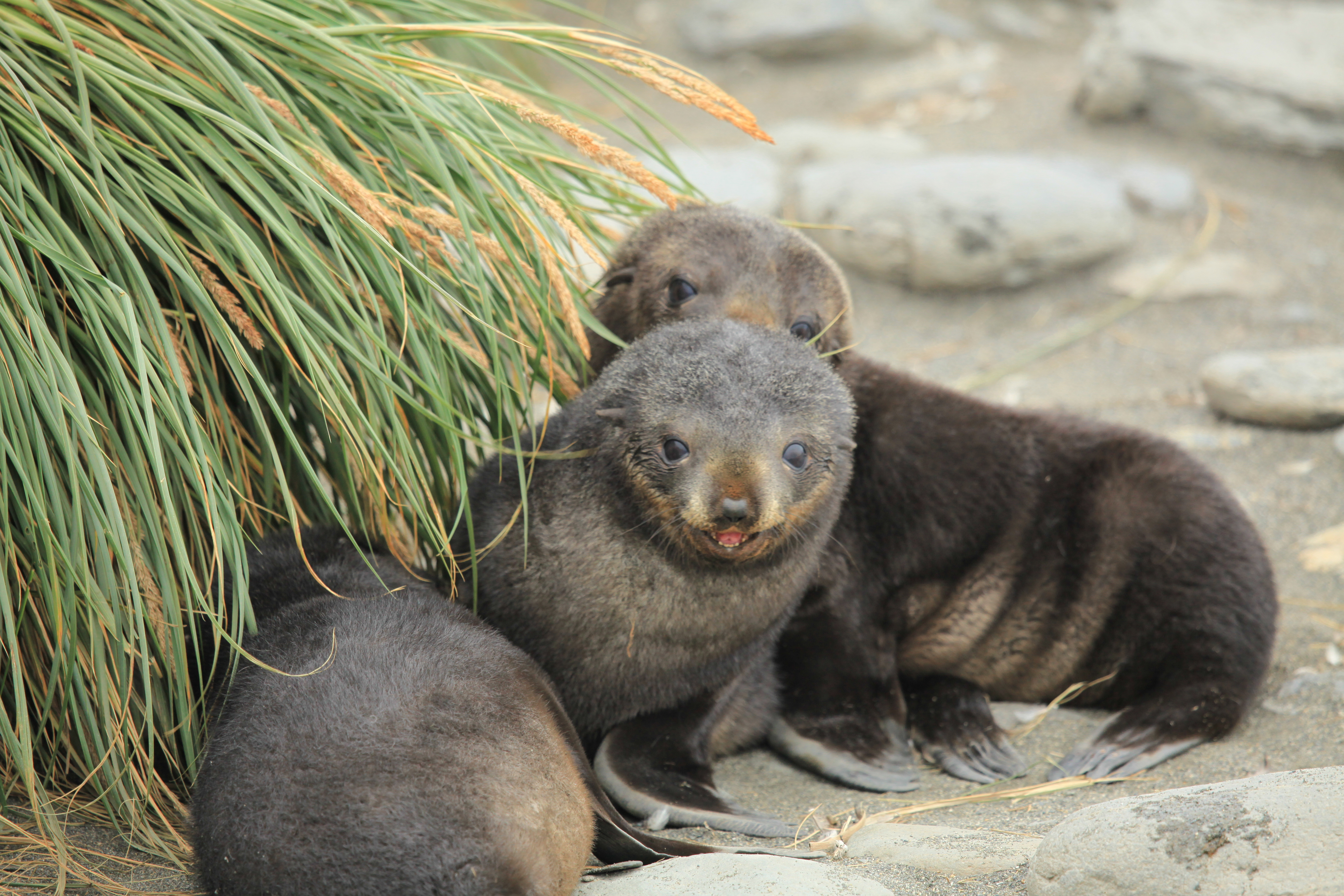
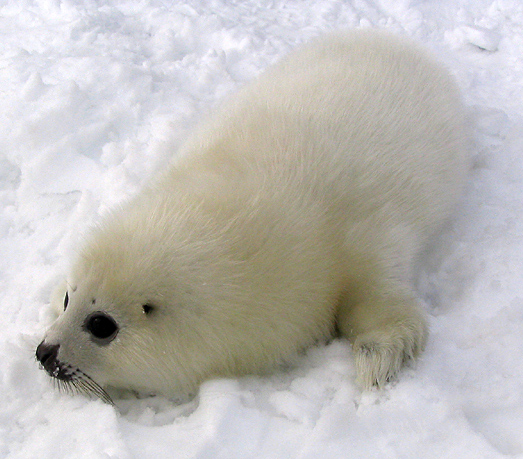
Antarctic fur seal pups (left) vs. Arctic harp seal pup (right)

An apex predator affects prey population dynamics and defense tactics (such as camouflage). The polar bear is the apex predator within its range. Several animal species, particularly Arctic foxes (Vulpes lagopus) and glaucous gulls (Larus hyperboreus), routinely scavenge polar bear kills. The relationship between ringed seals and polar bears is so close that the abundance of ringed seals in some areas appears to regulate the density of polar bears, while polar bear predation in turn regulates density and reproductive success of ringed seals. The evolutionary pressure of polar bear predation on seals probably accounts for some significant differences between Arctic and Antarctic seals. Compared to the Antarctic, where there is no major surface predator, Arctic seals use more breathing holes per individual, appear more restless when hauled out on the ice, and rarely defecate on the ice. The fur of Arctic pups is white, presumably to provide camouflage from predators, whereas Antarctic pups all have dark fur.

Killer whales are apex predators throughout their global distribution, and can have a profound effect on the behavior and population of prey species. Their diet is very broad and they can feed on many vertebrates in the ocean including salmon, rays, sharks (even white sharks), large baleen whales, and nearly 20 species of pinniped. The predation of whale calves may be responsible for annual whale migrations to calving grounds in more tropical waters, where the population of killer whales is much lower than in polar waters. Prior to whaling, it is thought that great whales were a major food source; however, after their sharp decline, killer whales have since expanded their diet, leading to the decline of smaller marine mammals. A decline in Aleutian Islands sea otter populations in the 1990s was controversially attributed by some scientists to killer whale predation, although with no direct evidence. The decline of sea otters followed a decline in harbor seal and Steller sea lion populations, the killer whale's preferred prey, which in turn may be substitutes for their original prey, now reduced by industrial whaling.

=== Whale pump ===
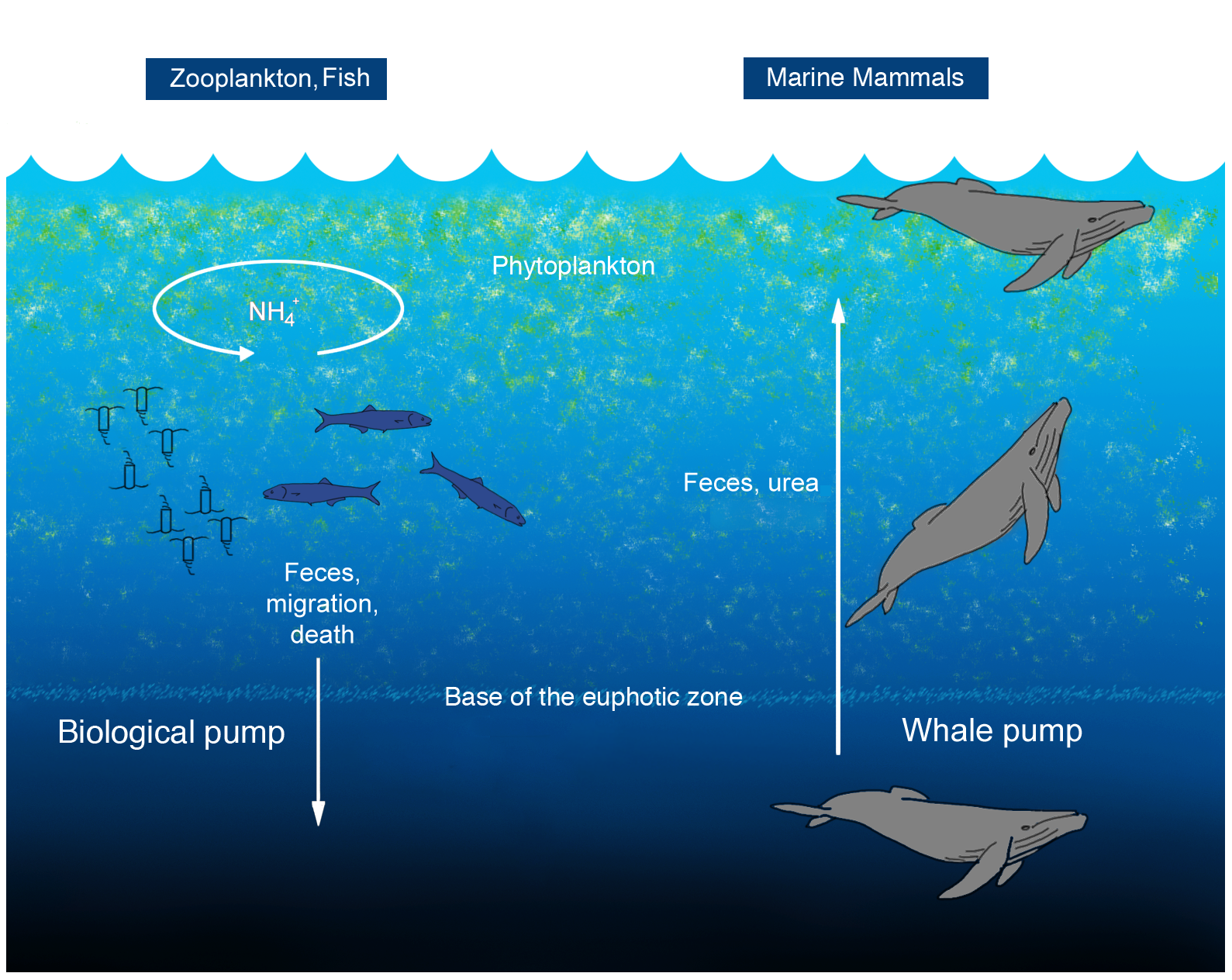
"Whale pump" – the role played by whales in recycling ocean nutrients

A 2010 study considered whales to be a positive influence to the productivity of ocean fisheries, in what has been termed a "whale pump". Whales carry nutrients such as nitrogen from the depths back to the surface. This functions as an upward biological pump, reversing an earlier presumption that whales accelerate the loss of nutrients to the bottom. This nitrogen input in the Gulf of Maine is more than the input of all rivers combined emptying into the gulf, some 25,000 short tons (23,000 t) each year. Whales defecate at the ocean's surface; their excrement is important for fisheries because it is rich in iron and nitrogen. The whale feces are liquid and instead of sinking, they stay at the surface where phytoplankton feed off it.

Upon death, whale carcasses fall to the deep ocean and provide a substantial habitat for marine life. Evidence of whale falls in present-day and fossil records shows that deep-sea whale falls support a rich assemblage of creatures, with a global diversity of 407 species, comparable to other neritic biodiversity hotspots, such as cold seeps and hydrothermal vents. Deterioration of whale carcasses happens through a series of three stages. Initially, moving organisms, such as sharks and hagfish, scavenge soft tissue at a rapid rate over a period of months to as long as two years. This is followed by the colonization of bones and surrounding sediments (which contain organic matter) by enrichment opportunists, such as crustaceans and polychaetes, throughout a period of years. Finally, sulfophilic bacteria reduce the bones releasing hydrogen sulphide enabling the growth of chemoautotrophic organisms, which in turn, support other organisms such as mussels, clams, limpets, and sea snails. This stage may last for decades and supports a rich assemblage of species, averaging 185 species per site.

== Interactions with humans ==
=== Threats ===
Due to the difficulty to survey populations, 38% of marine mammals are data deficient, especially around the Antarctic Polar Front. In particular, declines in the populations of completely marine mammals tend to go unnoticed 70% of the time.

==== Exploitation ====
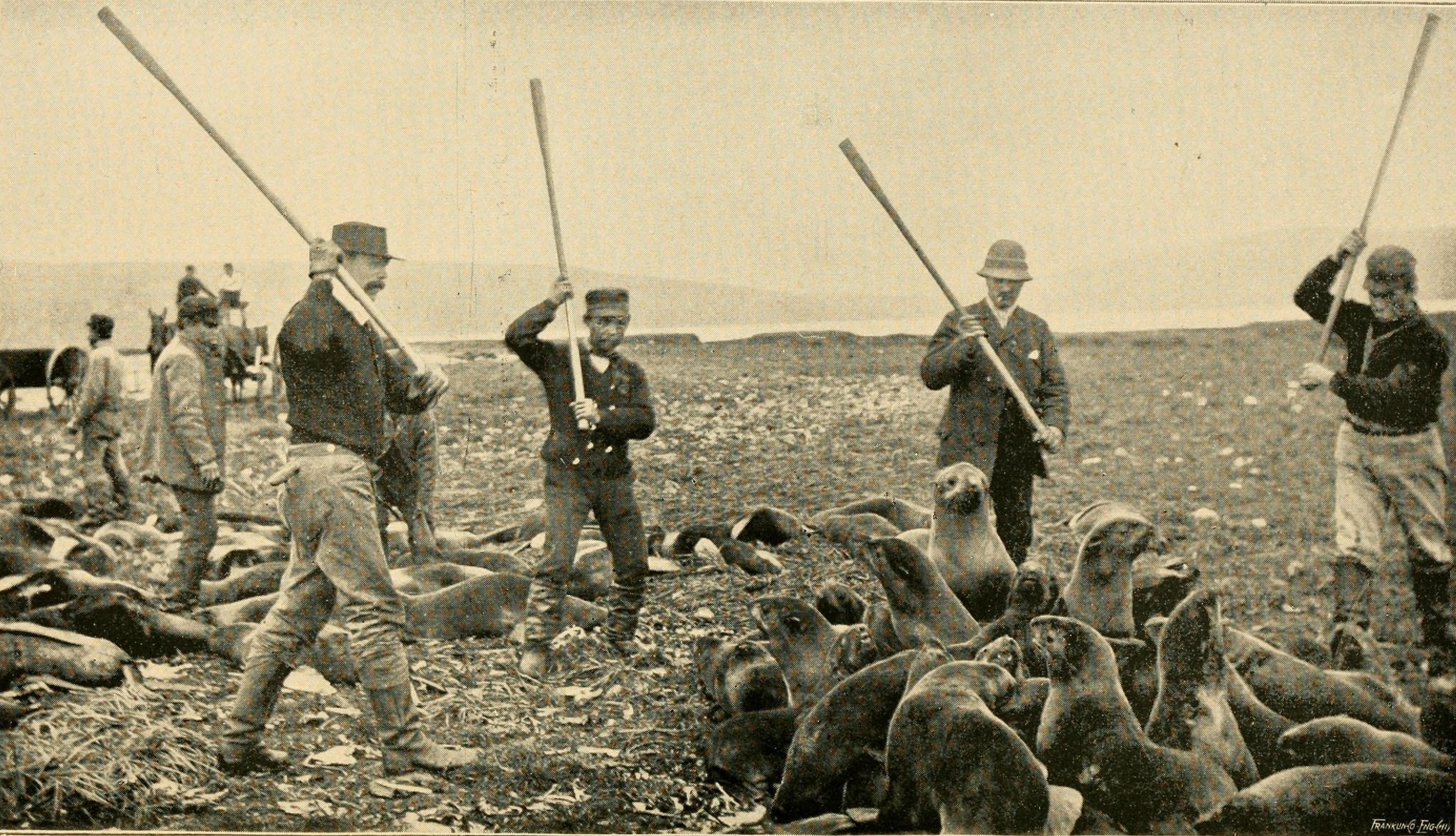
Men killing northern fur seals on Saint Paul Island, Alaska, in the 1890s

Marine mammals were hunted by coastal aboriginal humans historically for food and other resources. These subsistence hunts still occur in Canada, Greenland, Indonesia, Russia, the United States, and several nations in the Caribbean. The effects of these are only localized, as hunting efforts were on a relatively small scale. Commercial hunting took this to a much greater scale and marine mammals were heavily exploited. This led to the extinction of the Steller's sea cow (Hydrodamalis gigas), sea mink (Neogale macrodon), Japanese sea lion (Zalophus japonicus), and the Caribbean monk seal (Neomonachus tropicalis). Today, populations of species that were historically hunted, such as blue whales (Balaenoptera musculus) and the North Pacific right whale (Eubalaena japonica), are much lower than their pre-whaling levels. Because whales generally have slow growth rates, are slow to reach sexual maturity, and have a low reproductive output, population recovery has been very slow.

A number of whales are still subject to direct hunting, despite the 1986 moratorium on commercial whaling set under the terms of the International Whaling Commission (IWC). There are only two nations remaining which sanction commercial whaling: Norway, where several hundred common minke whales are harvested each year; and Iceland, where quotas of 150 fin whales and 100 minke whales per year are set. Japan also harvests several hundred Antarctic and North Pacific minke whales each year, ostensibly for scientific research in accordance with the moratorium. However, the illegal trade of whale and dolphin meat is a significant market in Japan and some countries.

Historical and modern range of northern sea otters

The most profitable furs in the fur trade were those of sea otters, especially the northern sea otter which inhabited the coastal waters between the Columbia River to the south and Cook Inlet to the north. The fur of the Californian southern sea otter was less highly prized and thus less profitable. After the northern sea otter was hunted to local extinction, maritime fur traders shifted to California until the southern sea otter was likewise nearly extinct. The British and American maritime fur traders took their furs to the Chinese port of Guangzhou (Canton), where they worked within the established Canton System. Furs from Russian America were mostly sold to China via the Mongolian trading town of Kyakhta, which had been opened to Russian trade by the 1727 Treaty of Kyakhta.

Commercial sealing was historically just as important as the whaling industry. Exploited species included harp seals, hooded seals, Caspian seals, elephant seals, walruses and all species of fur seal. The scale of seal harvesting decreased substantially after the 1960s, after the Canadian government reduced the length of the hunting season and implemented measures to protect adult females. Several species that were commercially exploited have rebounded in numbers; for example, Antarctic fur seals may be as numerous as they were prior to harvesting. The northern elephant seal was hunted to near extinction in the late 19th century, with only a small population remaining on Guadalupe Island. It has since recolonized much of its historic range, but has a population bottleneck. Conversely, the Mediterranean monk seal was extirpated from much of its former range, which stretched from the Mediterranean to the Black Sea and northwest Africa, and remains only in the northeastern Mediterranean and some parts of northwest Africa.

Polar bears can be hunted for sport in Canada with a special permit and accompaniment by a local guide. This can be an important source of income for small communities, as guided hunts bring in more income than selling the polar bear hide on markets. The United States, Russia, Norway, Greenland, and Canada allow subsistence hunting, and Canada distributes hunting permits to indigenous communities. The selling of these permits is a main source of income for many of these communities. Their hides can be used for subsistence purposes, kept as hunting trophies, or can be bought in markets.

==== Ocean traffic and fisheries ====
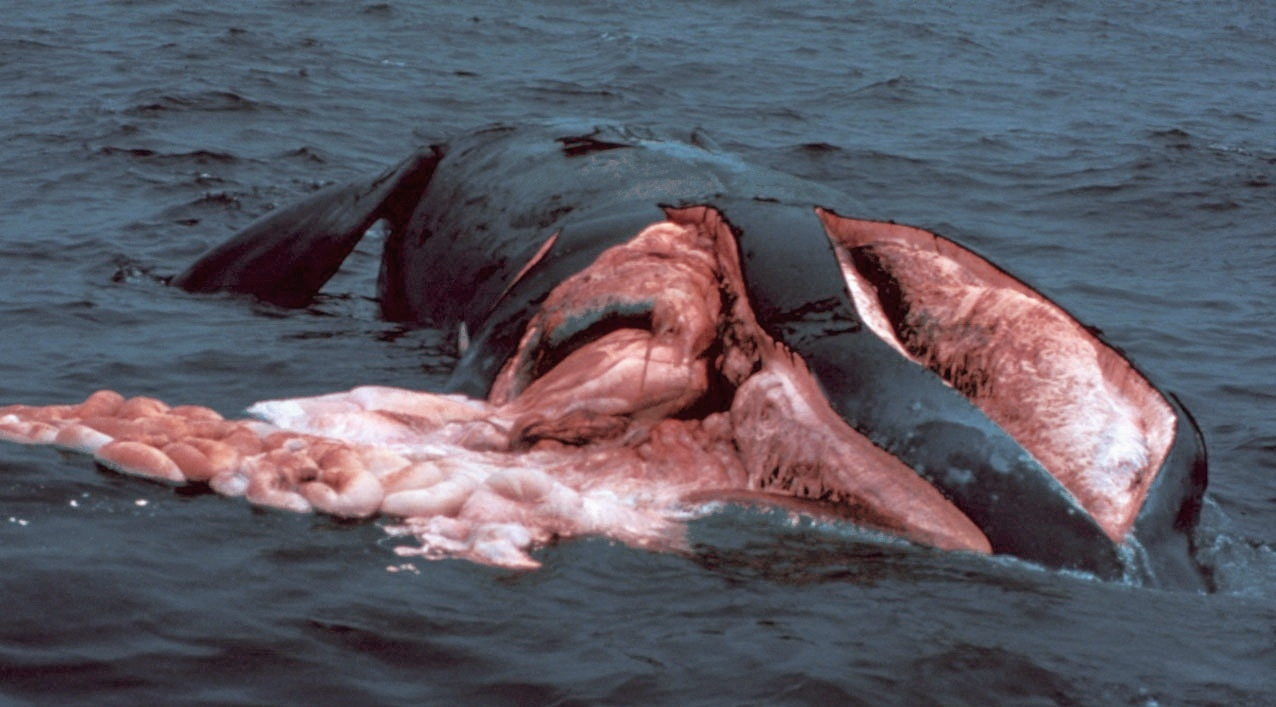
The remains of a North Atlantic right whale after it collided with a ship propeller

By-catch is the incidental capture of non-target species in fisheries. Fixed and drift gill nets cause the highest mortality levels for both cetaceans and pinnipeds, however, entanglements in long lines, mid-water trawls, and both trap and pot lines are also common. Tuna seines are particularly problematic for entanglement by dolphins. By-catch affects all cetaceans, both small and big, in all habitat types. However, smaller cetaceans and pinnipeds are most vulnerable as their size means that escape once they are entangled is highly unlikely and they frequently drown. While larger cetaceans are capable of dragging nets with them, the nets sometimes remain tightly attached to the individual and can impede the animal from feeding sometimes leading to starvation. Abandoned or lost nets and lines cause mortality through ingestion or entanglement. Marine mammals also get entangled in aquaculture nets, however, these are rare events and not prevalent enough to impact populations.

Vessel strikes cause death for a number of marine mammals, especially whales. In particular, fast commercial vessels such as container ships can cause major injuries or death when they collide with marine mammals. Collisions occur both with large commercial vessels and recreational boats and cause injury to whales or smaller cetaceans. The critically endangered North Atlantic right whale is particularly affected by vessel strikes. Tourism boats designed for whale and dolphin watching can also negatively impact on marine mammals by interfering with their natural behavior.

The fishery industry not only threatens marine mammals through by-catch, but also through competition for food. Large-scale fisheries have led to the depletion of fish stocks that are important prey species for marine mammals. Pinnipeds have been especially affected by the direct loss of food supplies and in some cases the harvesting of fish has led to food shortages or dietary deficiencies, starvation of young, and reduced recruitment into the population. As the fish stocks have been depleted, the competition between marine mammals and fisheries has sometimes led to conflict. Large-scale culling of populations of marine mammals by commercial fishers has been initiated in a number of areas in order to protect fish stocks for human consumption.

Shellfish aquaculture takes up space so in effect creates competition for space. However, there is little direct competition for aquaculture shellfish harvest. On the other hand, marine mammals regularly take finfish from farms, which creates significant problems for marine farmers. While there are usually legal mechanisms designed to deter marine mammals, such as anti-predator nets or harassment devices, individuals are often illegally shot.

==== Habitat loss and degradation ====
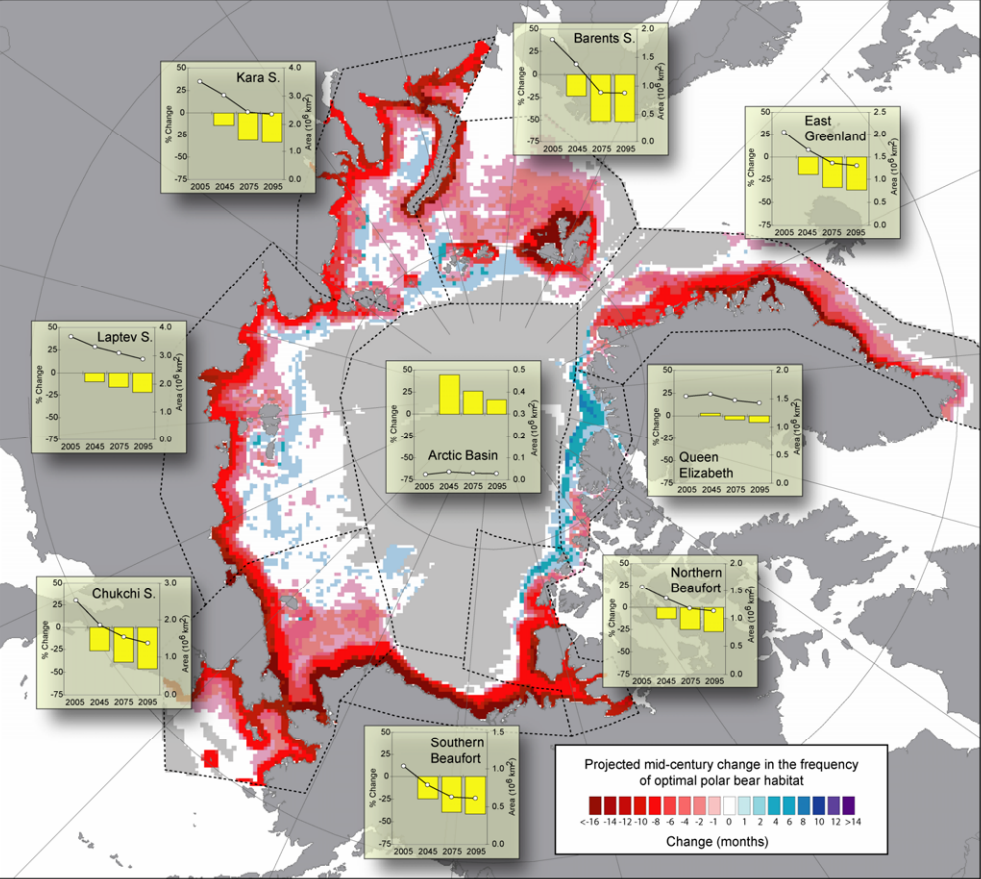
Map from the U.S. Geological Survey shows projected changes in polar bear habitat from 2005 to 2095. Red areas indicate loss of optimal polar bear habitat; blue areas indicate gain.

Habitat degradation is caused by a number of human activities. Marine mammals that live in coastal environments are the most likely to be affected by habitat degradation and loss. Developments such as sewage marine outfalls, moorings, dredging, blasting, dumping, port construction, hydroelectric projects, and aquaculture both degrade the environment and take up valuable habitat. For example, extensive shellfish aquaculture takes up valuable space used by coastal marine mammals for important activities such as breeding, foraging and resting.

Contaminants that are discharged into the marine environment accumulate in the bodies of marine mammals when they are stored unintentionally in their blubber along with energy. Contaminants that are found in the tissues of marine mammals include heavy metals, such as mercury and lead, but also organochlorides and polycyclic aromatic hydrocarbons. For example, these can cause disruptive effects on endocrine systems; impair the reproductive system, and lower the immune system of individuals, leading to a higher number of deaths. Other pollutants such as oil, plastic debris and sewage threaten the livelihood of marine mammals.

Noise pollution from anthropogenic activities is another major concern for marine mammals. This is a problem because underwater noise pollution interferes with the abilities of some marine mammals to communicate, and locate both predators and prey. Underwater explosions are used for a variety of purposes including military activities, construction and oceanographic or geophysical research. They can cause injuries such as hemorrhaging of the lungs, and contusion and ulceration of the gastrointestinal tract. Underwater noise is generated from shipping, the oil and gas industry, research, and military use of sonar and oceanographic acoustic experimentation. Acoustic harassment devices and acoustic deterrent devices used by aquaculture facilities to scare away marine mammals emit loud and noxious underwater sounds.

Two changes to the global atmosphere due to anthropogenic activity threaten marine mammals. The first is increases in ultraviolet radiation due to ozone depletion, and this mainly affects the Antarctic and other areas of the Southern Hemisphere. An increase in ultraviolet radiation has the capacity to decrease phytoplankton abundance, which forms the basis of the food chain in the ocean. The second effect of global climate change is global warming due to increased carbon dioxide levels in the atmosphere. Raised sea levels, rising sea temperatures and changed currents are expected to affect marine mammals by altering the distribution of important prey species, and changing the suitability of breeding sites and migratory routes. The Arctic food chain would be disrupted by the near extinction or migration of polar bears. Arctic sea ice is the polar bear's habitat. It has been declining at a rate of 13% per decade because the temperature is rising at twice the rate of the rest of the world. By the year 2050, up to two-thirds of the world's polar bears may vanish if the sea ice continues to melt at its current rate.

A study by evolutionary biologists at the University of Pittsburgh showed that the ancestors of many marine mammals stopped producing a certain enzyme that today protects against some neurotoxic chemicals called organophosphates, including those found in the widely used pesticides chlorpyrifos and diazinon. Marine mammals may be increasingly exposed to these compounds due to agricultural runoff reaching the world's oceans.

=== Protection ===
Signatory countries of the International Whaling Commission (IWC)

The Marine Mammal Protection Act of 1972 (MMPA) was passed on October 21, 1972, under president Richard Nixon to prevent the further depletion and possible extinction of marine mammal stocks. It prohibits the taking ("the act of hunting, killing, capture, and/or harassment of any marine mammal; or, the attempt at such") of any marine mammal without a permit issued by the Secretary. Authority to manage the MMPA was divided between the Secretary of the Interior through the U.S. Fish and Wildlife Service (Service), and the Secretary of Commerce, which is delegated to the National Oceanic and Atmospheric Administration (NOAA). The Marine Mammal Commission (MMC) was established to review existing policies and make recommendations to the Service and NOAA to better implement the MMPA. The Service is responsible for ensuring the protection of sea otters and marine otters, walruses, polar bears, the three species of manatees, and dugongs; and NOAA was given responsibility to conserve and manage pinnipeds (excluding walruses) and cetaceans.

The Act was updated on 1 January 2016 with a clause banning "the import of fish from fisheries that cannot prove they meet US standards for protecting marine mammals". The requirement to show that protection standards are met is hoped to compel countries exporting fish to the US to more strictly control their fisheries that no protected marine mammals are adversely affected by fishing.

The 1979 Convention on the Conservation of Migratory Species of Wild Animals (CMS) is the only global organization that conserves a broad range of animals, which includes marine mammals. Of the agreements made, three of them deal with the conservation of marine mammals: ACCOBAMS, ASCOBANS and the Wadden Sea Agreement. In 1982, the United Nations Convention on the Law of the Sea (UNCLOS) adopted a pollution prevention approach to conservation, which many other conventions at the time also adopted.

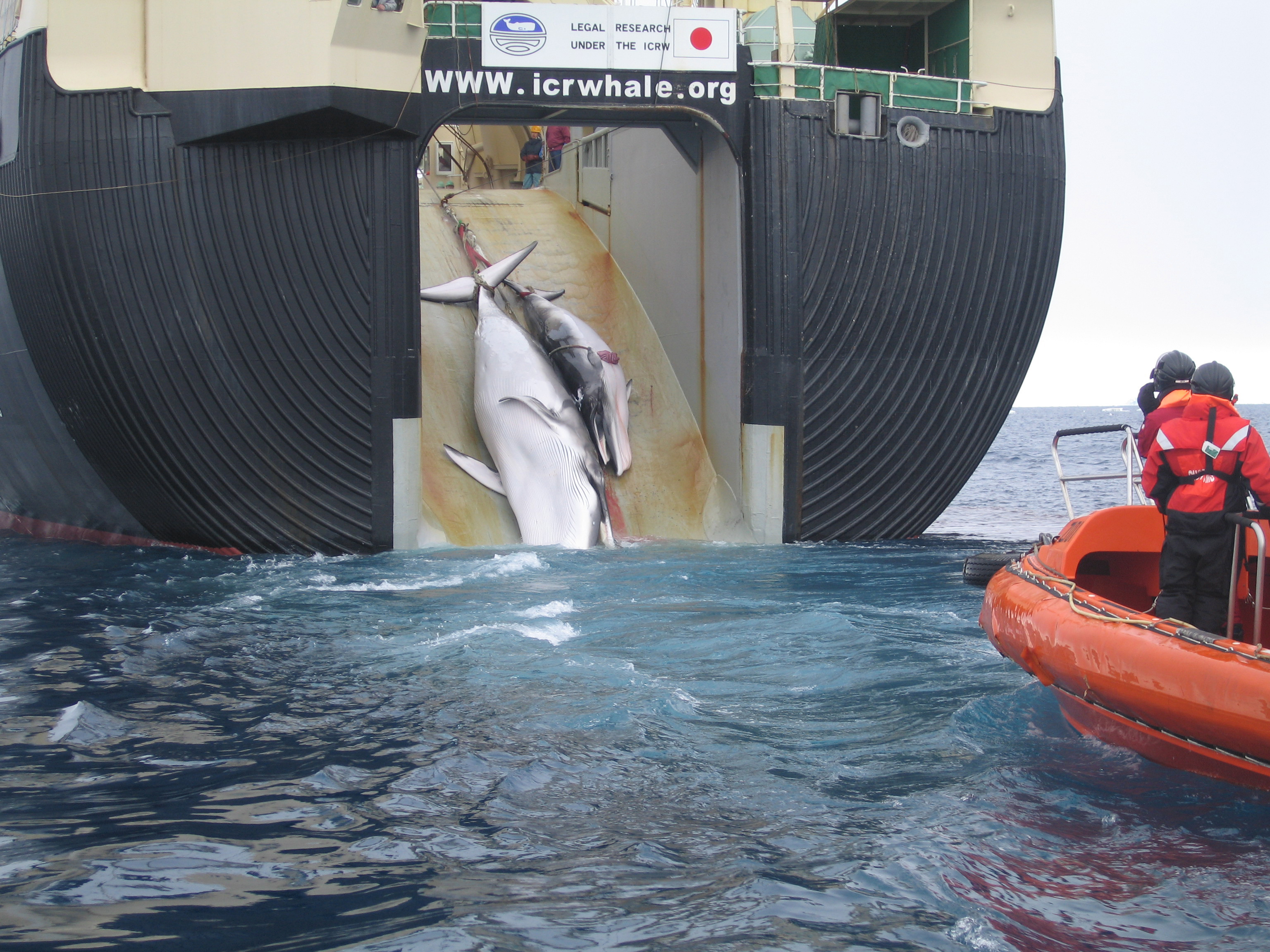
An adult and sub-adult Minke whale are dragged aboard the Nisshin Maru, a Japanese whaling vessel

The Agreement on the Conservation of Cetaceans in the Black Sea, Mediterranean Sea and contiguous Atlantic area (ACCOBAMS), founded in 1996, specifically protects cetaceans in the Mediterranean area, and "maintains a favorable status", a direct action against whaling. There are 23 member states. The Agreement on the Conservation of Small Cetaceans of the Baltic and North Seas (ASCOBANS) was adopted alongside ACCOBAMS to establish a special protection area for Europe's increasingly threatened cetaceans. Other anti-whaling efforts include a ten-year moratorium in 1986 by the IWC on all whaling, and an environmental agreement (a type of international law) the International Convention for the Regulation of Whaling which controlled commercial, scientific and subsistence whaling.

The Agreement on the Conservation of Seals in the Wadden Sea, enforced in 1991, prohibits the killing or harassment of seals in the Wadden Sea, specifically targeting the harbor seal population.

The 1973 Agreement on the Conservation of Polar Bears between Canada, Denmark (Greenland), Norway (Svalbard), the United States and the Soviet Union outlawed the unregulated hunting of polar bears from aircraft and icebreakers, as well as protecting migration, feeding and hibernation sites.

Various non-governmental organizations participate in marine conservation activism, wherein they draw attention to and aid in various problems in marine conservation, such as pollution, whaling, bycatch, and so forth. Notable organizations include the Greenpeace who focus on overfishing and whaling among other things, and Sea Shepherd Conservation Society who are known for taking direct-action tactics to expose illegal activity.

=== As food ===
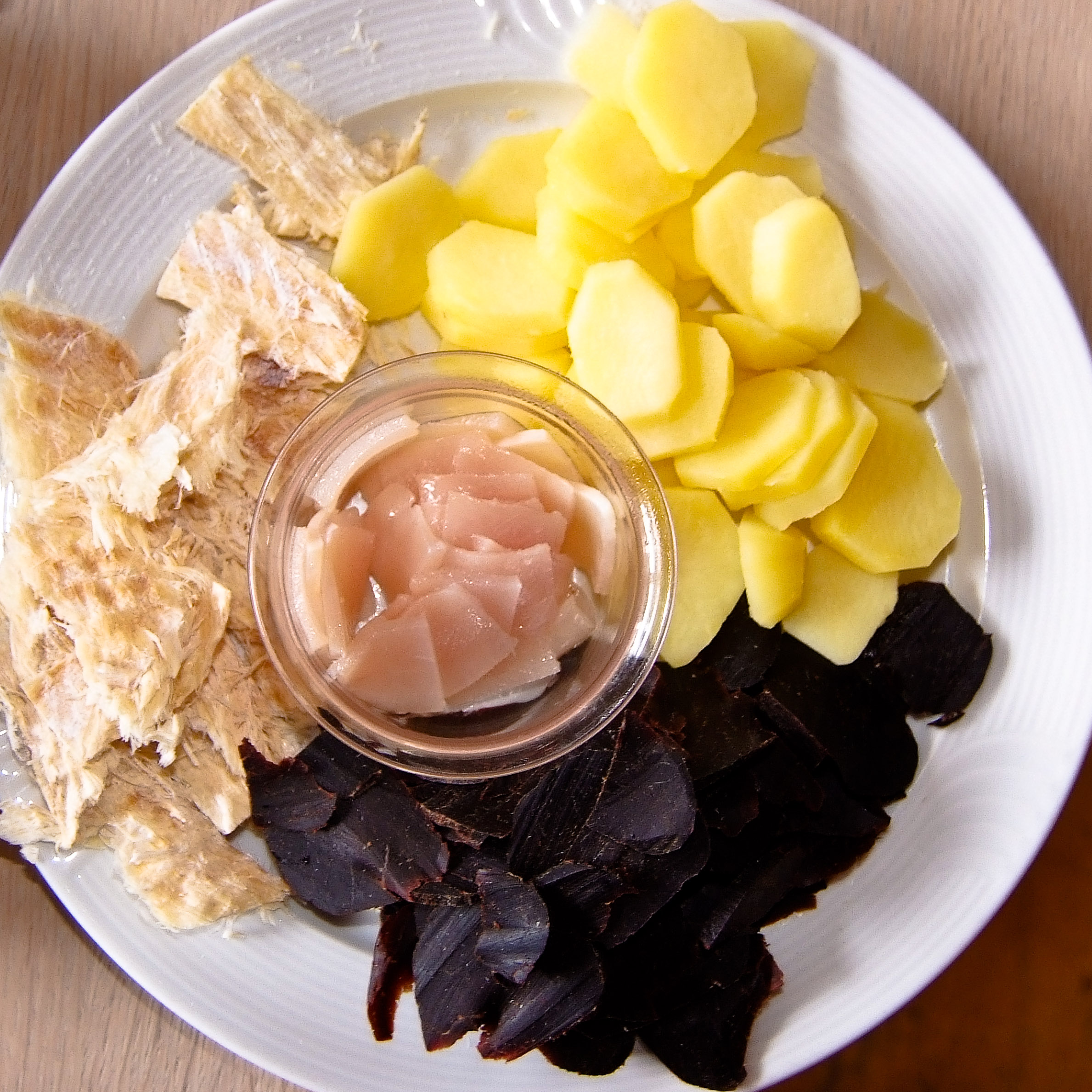
Pilot whale meat (bottom), blubber (middle) and dried fish (left) with potatoes, Faroe Islands

For thousands of years, indigenous peoples of the Arctic have depended on whale meat and seal meat. The meat is harvested from legal, non-commercial hunts that occur twice a year in the spring and autumn. The meat is stored and eaten throughout the winter. The skin and blubber (muktuk) taken from the bowhead, beluga, or narwhal is also valued, and is eaten raw or cooked. Whaling has also been practiced in the Faroe Islands in the North Atlantic since about the time of the first Norse settlements on the islands. Around 1,000 long-finned pilot whales are still killed annually, mainly during the summer. Today, dolphin meat is consumed in a small number of countries worldwide, which include Japan and Peru (where it is referred to as chancho marino, or "sea pork"). In some parts of the world, such as Taiji (in Japan) and the Faroe Islands, dolphins are traditionally considered food, and are killed in harpoon or drive hunts.

There have been human health concerns associated with the consumption of dolphin meat in Japan after tests showed that dolphin meat contained high levels of methylmercury. There are no known cases of mercury poisoning as a result of consuming dolphin meat, though the government continues to monitor people in areas where dolphin meat consumption is high. The Japanese government recommends that children and pregnant women avoid eating dolphin meat on a regular basis. Similar concerns exist with the consumption of dolphin meat in the Faroe Islands, where prenatal exposure to methylmercury and PCBs primarily from the consumption of pilot whale meat has resulted in neuropsychological deficits amongst children.

The Faroe Islands population was exposed to methylmercury largely from contaminated pilot whale meat, which contained very high levels of about 2 mg methylmercury/kg. However, the Faroe Islands populations also eat significant amounts of fish. The study of about 900 Faroese children showed that prenatal exposure to methylmercury resulted in neuropsychological deficits at 7 years of age

— World Health Organization

Ringed seals were once the main food staple for the Inuit. They are still an important food source for the people of Nunavut and are also hunted and eaten in Alaska. Seal meat is an important source of food for residents of small coastal communities. The seal blubber is used to make seal oil, which is marketed as a fish oil supplement. In 2001, two percent of Canada's raw seal oil was processed and sold in Canadian health stores.

=== In captivity ===
==== Aquariums ====
===== Cetaceans =====
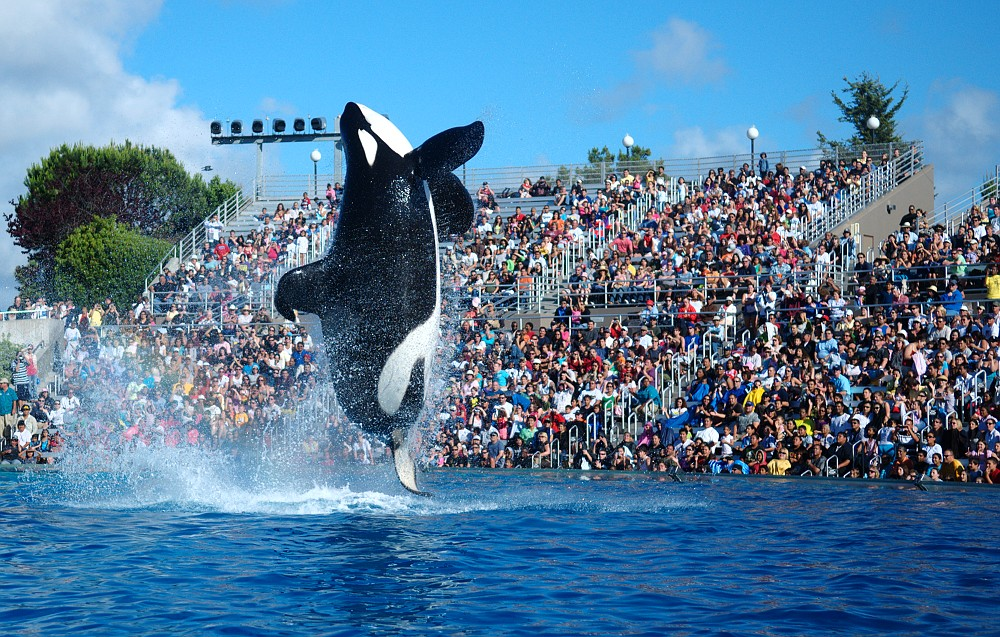
Performing killer whale at SeaWorld San Diego, 2009

Various species of dolphins are kept in captivity. These small cetaceans are more often than not kept in theme parks and dolphinariums, such as SeaWorld. Bottlenose dolphins are the most common species of dolphin kept in dolphinariums as they are relatively easy to train and have a long lifespan in captivity. Hundreds of bottlenose dolphins live in captivity across the world, though exact numbers are hard to determine. The dolphin "smile" makes them popular attractions, as this is a welcoming facial expression in humans; however, the smile is due to a lack of facial muscles and subsequent lack of facial expressions.

Organizations such as World Animal Protection and the Whale and Dolphin Conservation campaign against the practice of keeping cetaceans, particularly killer whales, in captivity. In captivity, they often develop pathologies, such as the dorsal fin collapse seen in 60–90% of male killer whales. Captives have vastly reduced life expectancies, on average only living into their twenties. In the wild, females who survive infancy live 46 years on average, and up to 70–80 years in rare cases. Wild males who survive infancy live 31 years on average, and up to 50–60 years. Captivity usually bears little resemblance to wild habitat, and captive whales' social groups are foreign to those found in the wild. Captive life is also stressful due to the requirement to perform circus tricks that are not part of wild killer whale behavior, as well as restricting pool size. Wild killer whales may travel up to 100 miles (160 km) in a day, and critics say the animals are too big and intelligent to be suitable for captivity. Captives occasionally act aggressively towards themselves, their tankmates, or humans, which critics say is a result of stress. Dolphins are often trained to do several anthropomorphic behaviors, including waving and kissing—behaviors wild dolphins would rarely do.

===== Pinnipeds =====
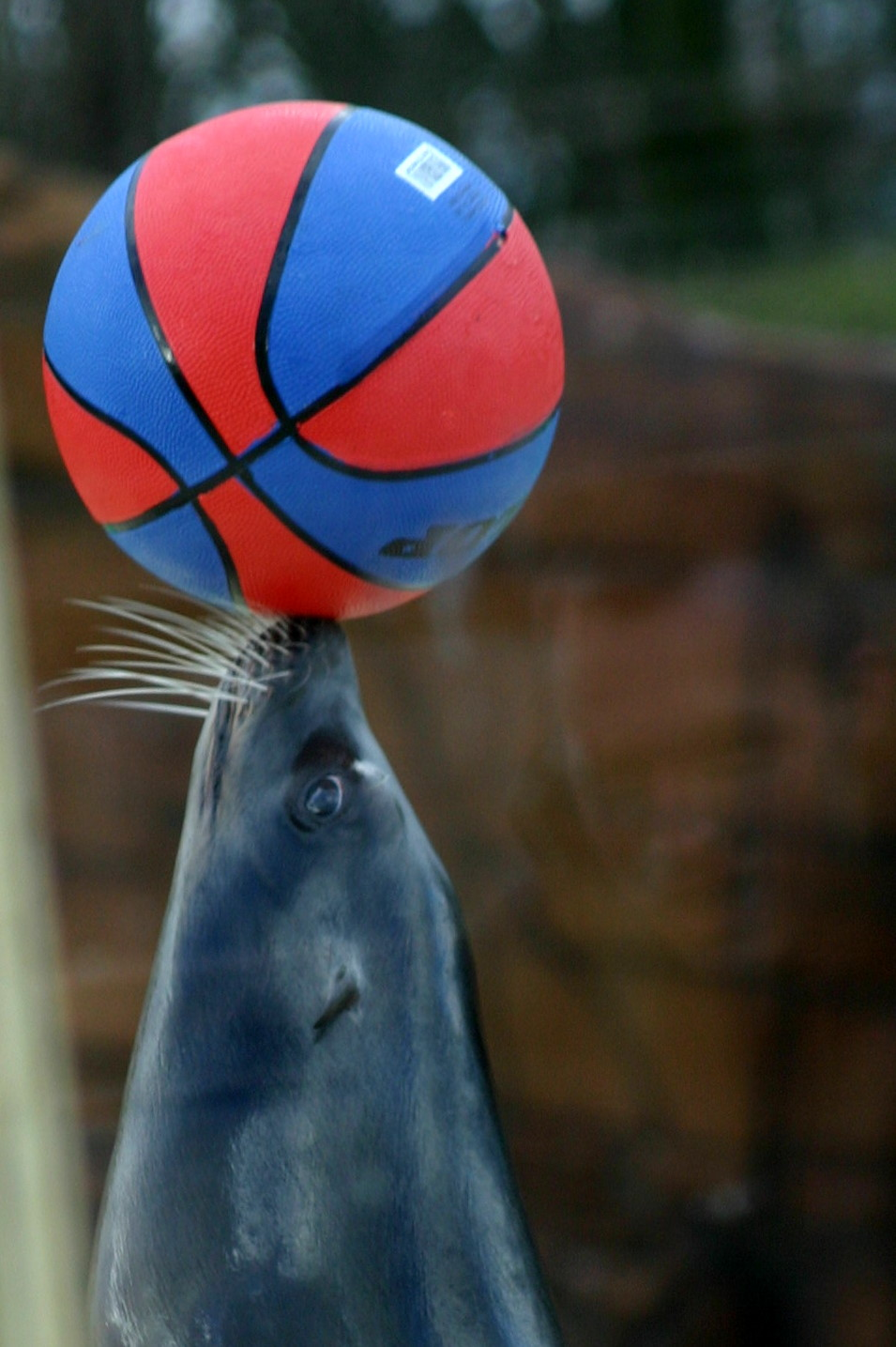
A sea lion trained to balance a ball on its nose

The large size and playfulness of pinnipeds make them popular attractions. Some exhibits have rocky backgrounds with artificial haul-out sites and a pool, while others have pens with small rocky, elevated shelters where the animals can dive into their pools. More elaborate exhibits contain deep pools that can be viewed underwater with rock-mimicking cement as haul-out areas. The most common pinniped species kept in captivity is the California sea lion as it is abundant and easy to train. These animals are used to perform tricks and entertain visitors. Other species popularly kept in captivity include the grey seal and harbor seal. Larger animals like walruses and Steller sea lions are much less common. Pinnipeds are popular attractions because they are "disneyfied", and consequently, people often anthropomorphize them with a curious, funny, or playful nature.

Some organizations, such as the Humane Society of the United States and World Animal Protection, object to keeping pinnipeds and other marine mammals in captivity. They state that the exhibits could not be large enough to house animals that have evolved to be migratory, and a pool could never replace the size and biodiversity of the ocean. They also oppose using sea lions for entertainment, claiming the tricks performed are "exaggerated variations of their natural behaviors" and distract the audience from the animal's unnatural environment.

===== Sea otter =====
Sea otters can do well in captivity, and are featured in over 40 public aquariums and zoos. The Seattle Aquarium became the first institution to raise sea otters from conception to adulthood with the birth of Tichuk in 1979, followed by three more pups in the early 1980s. In 2007, a YouTube video of two cute sea otters holding paws drew 1.5 million viewers in two weeks, and had over 20 million views as of January 2015. Filmed five years previously at the Vancouver Aquarium, it was YouTube's most popular animal video at the time, although it has since been surpassed. Otters are often viewed as having a "happy family life", but this is an anthropomorphism.

===== Sirenians =====
The oldest manatee in captivity was Snooty, at the South Florida Museum's Parker Manatee Aquarium in Bradenton, Florida. Born at the Miami Aquarium and Tackle Company on July 21, 1948, Snooty was one of the first recorded captive manatee births. He was raised entirely in captivity, and died at the age of 69. Manatees can also be viewed in a number of European zoos, such as the Tierpark in Berlin, the Nuremberg Zoo, in ZooParc de Beauval in France, and in the Aquarium of Genoa in Italy. The River Safari at Singapore features seven of them.

==== Military ====
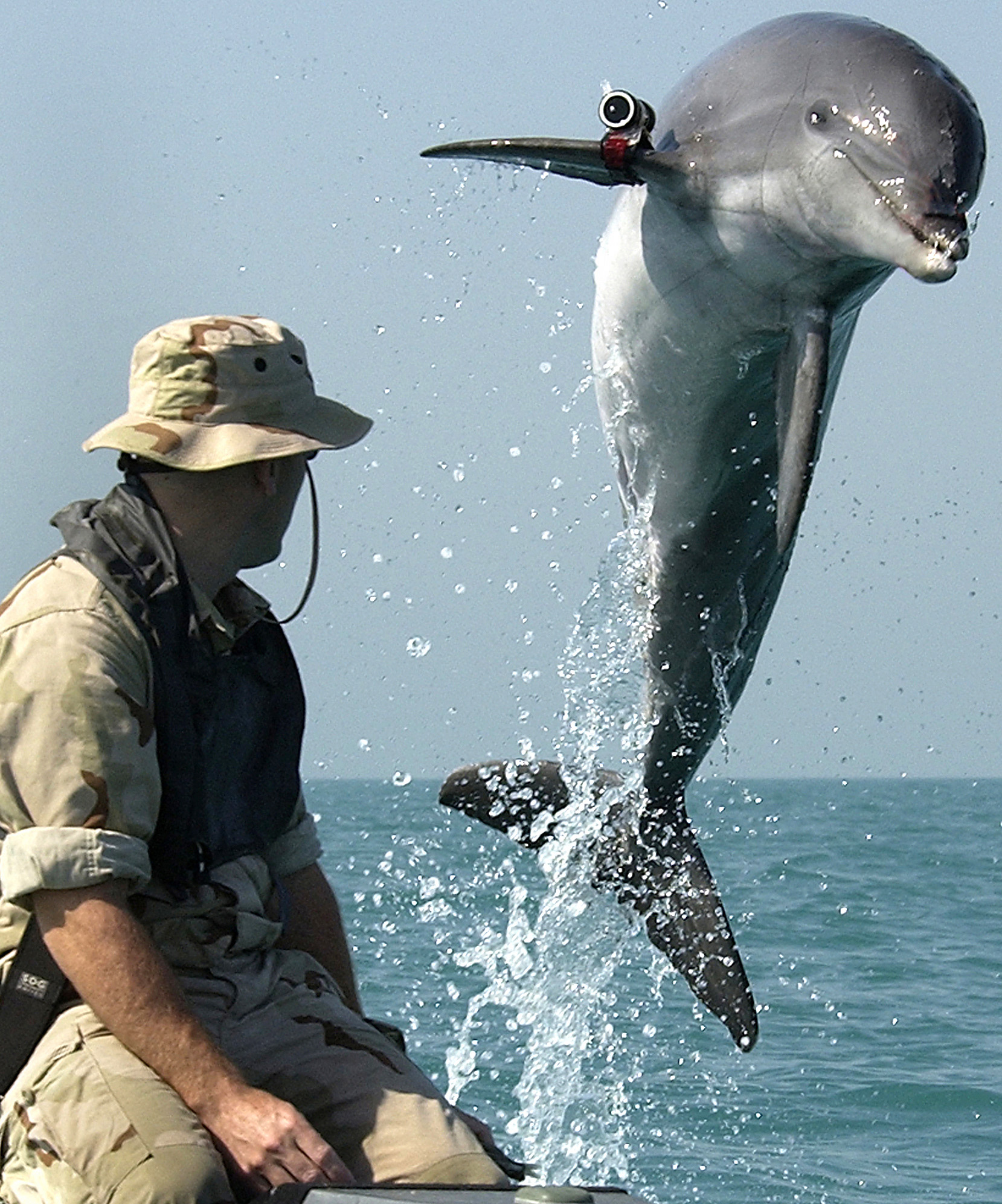
A dolphin wearing a locating pinger, performing mine clearance work in the Iraq War

Bottlenose dolphins and California sea lions are used in the United States Navy Marine Mammal Program (NMMP) to detect mines, protect ships from enemy soldiers, and recover objects. The Navy has never trained attack dolphins, as they would not be able to discern allied soldiers from enemy soldiers. There were five marine mammal teams, each purposed for one of the three tasks: MK4 (dolphins), MK5 (sea lions), MK6 (dolphins and sea lions), MK7 (dolphins) and MK8 (dolphins); MK is short for mark. The dolphin teams were trained to detect and mark mines either attached to the seafloor or floating in the water column, because dolphins can use their echolocative abilities to detect mines. The sea lion team retrieved test equipment such as fake mines or bombs dropped from planes usually out of reach of divers who would have to make multiple dives. MK6 protects harbors and ships from enemy divers, and was operational in the Gulf War and Vietnam War. The dolphins would swim up behind enemy divers and attach a buoy to their air tank, so that they would float to the surface and alert nearby Navy personnel. Sea lions would hand-cuff the enemy, and try to outmaneuver their counter-attacks.

The use of marine mammals by the Navy, even in accordance with the Navy's policy, continues to meet opposition. The Navy's policy says that only positive reinforcement is to be used while training the military dolphins, and that they be cared for in accordance with accepted standards in animal care. The inevitable stresses involved in training are topics of controversy, as their treatment is unlike the animals' natural lifestyle, especially towards their confined spaces when not training. There is also controversy over the use of muzzles and other inhibitors, which prevent the dolphins from foraging for food while working. The Navy states that this is to prevent them from ingesting harmful objects, but conservation activists say this is done to reinforce the trainers' control over the dolphins, who hand out food rewards. The means of transportation is also an issue for conservation activists, since they are hauled in dry carriers, and switching tanks and introducing dolphins to new dolphins could be potentially dangerous as they are territorial.

== See also ==
- Aquatic animal
- Marine mammal training
