= Acoustic harassment device =

Acoustic technologies used to keep animals or humans away from an area

Acoustic harassment and acoustic deterrents are technologies used to keep animals and in some cases humans away from an area. Applications of the technology are used to keep marine mammals away from aquaculture facilities and to keep birds away from certain areas (for instance in the vicinity of airports and blueberry fields). The devices have also been employed to keep marine mammals away from fishing nets. The devices are known as acoustic harassment devices (AHDs) and acoustic deterrent devices, which are smaller AHDs or intended as an awareness tool to warn species to the presence of danger rather than as a tool of harassment at a much louder level.

While they have proven effective over the short-term, animals tend to become conditioned over time and can even be drawn to the sounds once they habituate to the lack of real danger and the presence of sustenance. Only acoustic harassment devices that cause actual pain have been found to be effective over the longer term. The devices can cause hearing damage in non-targeted species and design changes in the fishing gear, fishing methods, and fish farm design to provide a permanent solution are preferable.

== History ==
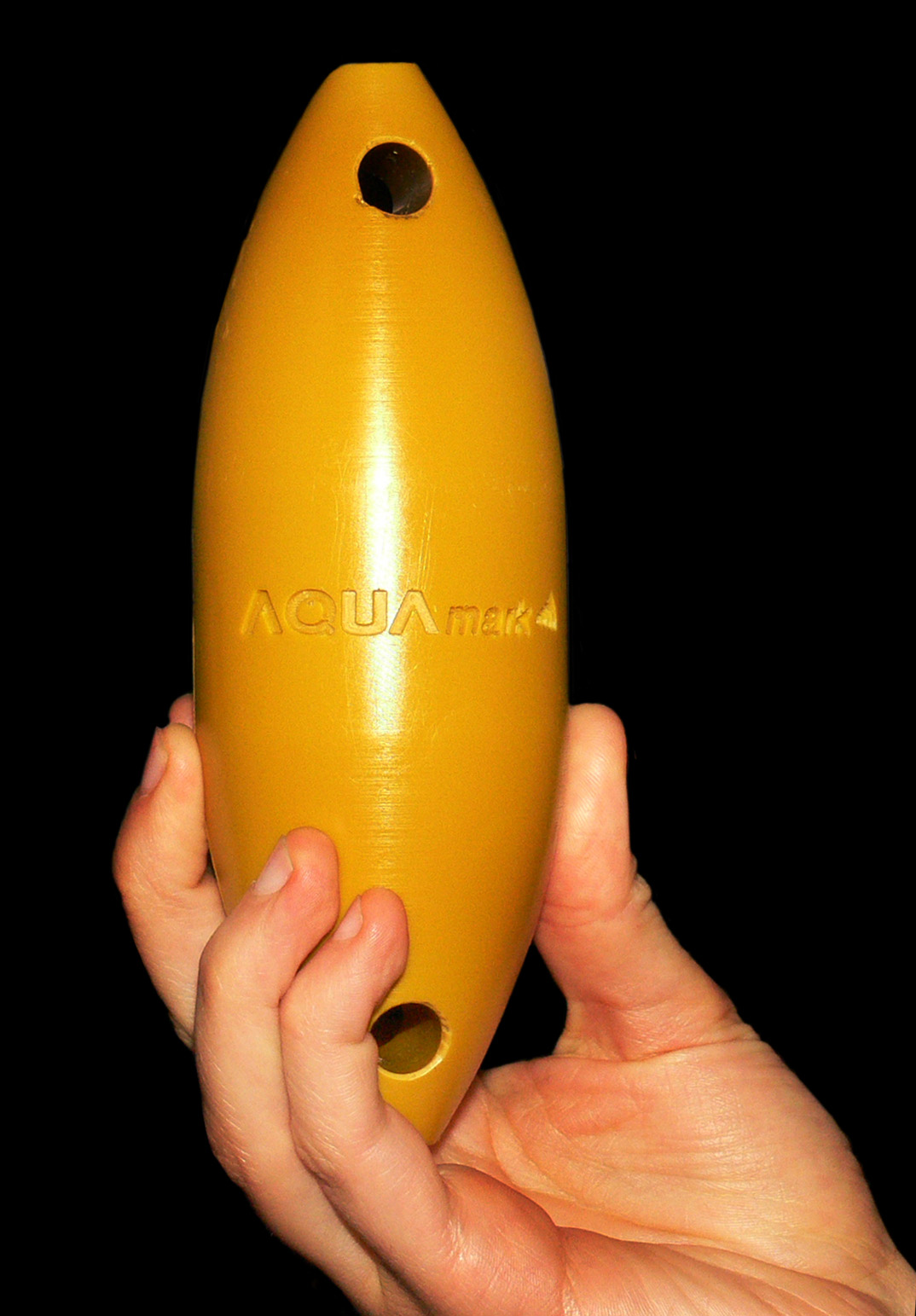
An acoustic pinger (active sonar) used to repel cetaceans (including dolphins and porpoises) away from fishing nets

Primitive harassment methods included firecrackers, rubber bullets, chasing animals by boat, banging pipes and seal bombs (incendiary devices). Devices emitting loud noises have also been used, including broadcasts of killer whale sounds, pingers, and acoustic buzzers. These often employ shrill sounding screams broadcast between 12 and 17 kHz. Acoustic deterrent devices normally broadcast near 10 kHz and use high volume. The intensity level of acoustic harassment devices has been measured up to 194 dB re 1uPa @ 1 m and the noise can be audible up to 50 kilometers away.

== Assessments ==
Studies of long-term effects on the marine environment have not been carried out, including damage to non-targeted species. Results of the devices are mixed, and they have proved ineffective in some circumstances, especially over the long term, while design improvements such as electric fences to keep seals from climbing into enclosures, gear modification to exclude certain species, and keeping aquaculture plants clean of dead fish have often been effective at solving the problem of keeping predatory species away. Reports indicate that in contrast to the harassment devices, the deterrent devices have been very effective in dealing with cetacean bycatch.

Recent research shows that acoustic deterrent devices intended to scare off seals do not work, but they do scare off porpoises.

A new technique called "startle technology" is currently in development. Preliminary trials conducted by the University of St. Andrews shows great promise as a substitute for ADDs.

== Acoustic devices and acoustic weapon use on humans ==
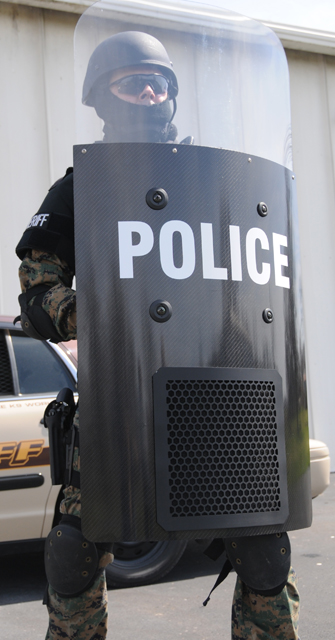
Law enforcement officer holding a Hypershield, an acoustic hailing device used for crowd and riot control

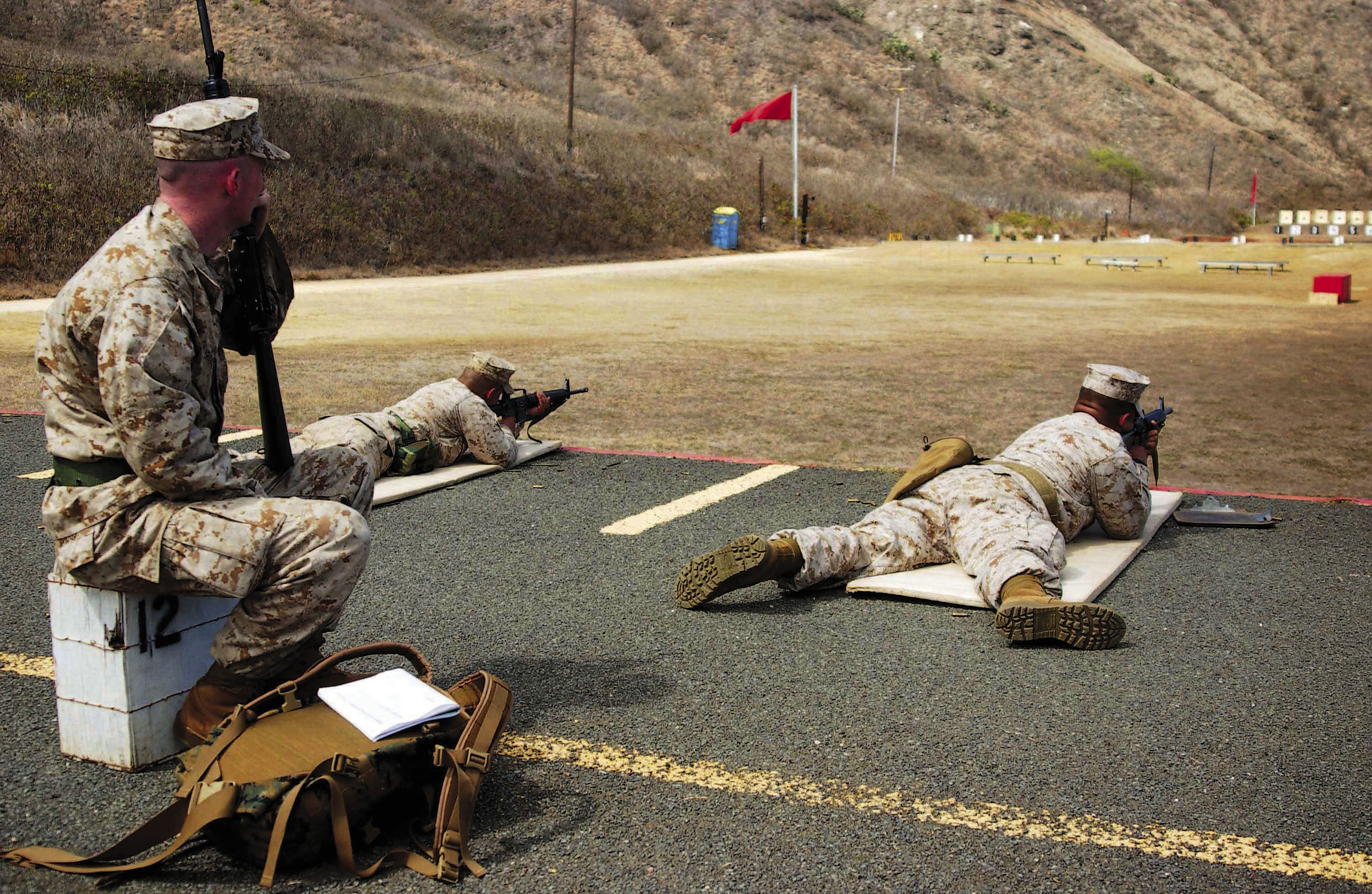
One use of LRADs (long range audio devices) is deploying them to prevent people from entering line of fire areas

Acoustic devices have been used for military purposes including to stress enemies, as an aid in interrogation, and to create "an infrasonic sound barrier". The British Army used "Squawk Boxes" to emit ultrasonic frequencies causing various discomforts. Audio harassment was also used by the U.S. military in the Vietnam War and was famously depicted in the fictional movie Apocalypse Now as helicopters descend on the enemy with loud speakers. Operation Wandering Soul broadcast voices purported to be dead Vietcong. Other examples include the 350 watt HPS-1 Sound System that could be heard 2.5 miles away and was used on the Vatican embassy in Panama where ousted president Manuel Noriega was in refuge. At the Branch Davidian siege in Waco, Texas, loud music was broadcast. Devices utilising the deterioration of hearing with age have been deployed to drive younger people away, e.g. The Mosquito.

== See also ==
- Acoustic Hailing Device
- The Mosquito
- Long Range Acoustic Device (LRAD)
- Sonic weapon
- Directional sound
- Bird control § Deterrents - Bird Scarers
