= The Mosquito =

Anti-loitering sonic device

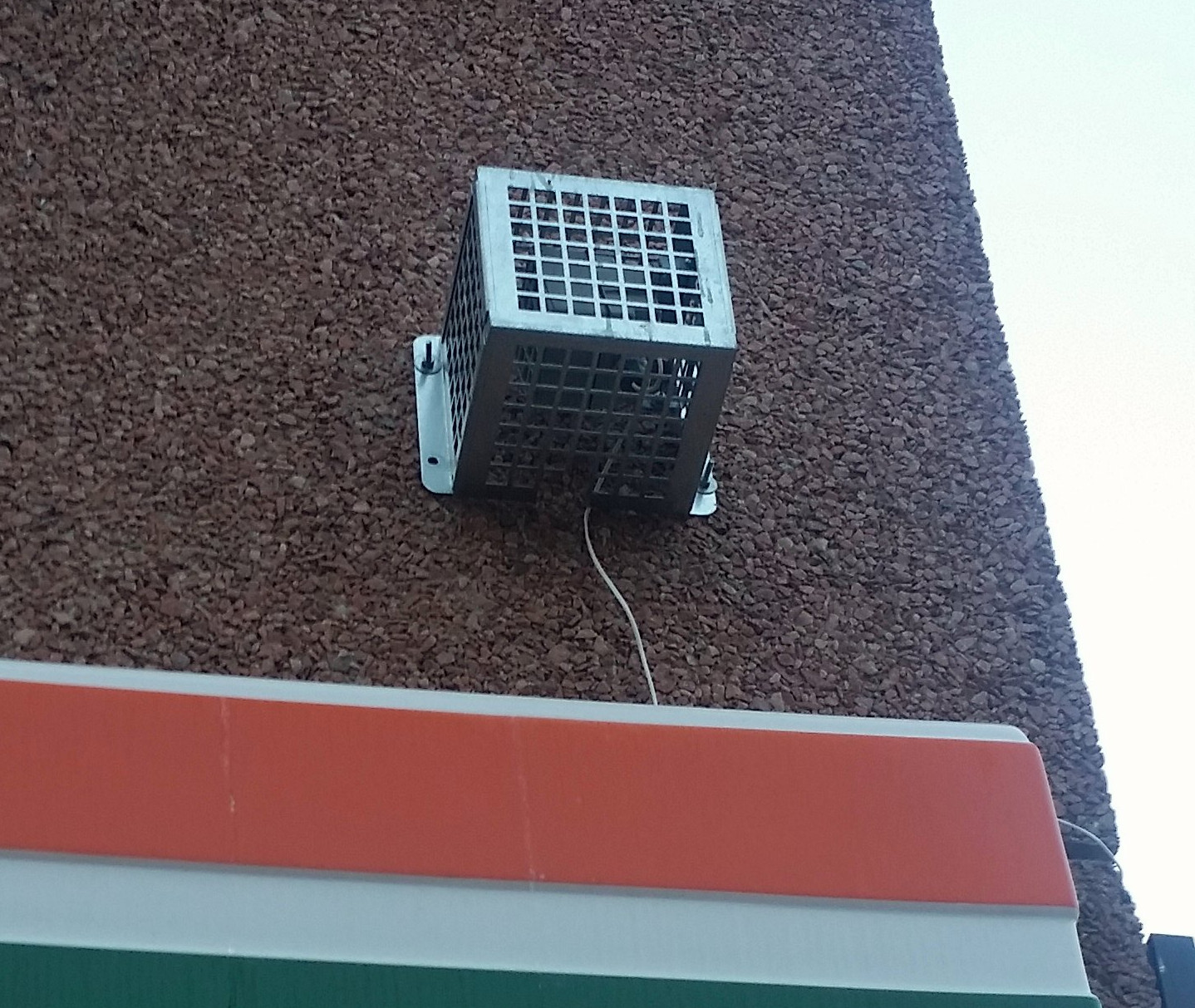
A Mosquito device mounted outside a store in Philadelphia

The Mosquito ringtone
This is a 10-second sample of an audio clip at a frequency of approximately 17.4 kHz.

The Mosquito or Mosquito alarm is a machine used to deter loitering by emitting sound at high frequency. In some versions, it is intentionally tuned to be heard primarily by younger people. Nicknamed "Mosquito" for the buzzing sound it plays, the device is marketed as a safety and security tool for preventing youths from congregating in specific areas.

The latest version of the device, launched late in 2008, has two frequency settings, one of approximately 17.4 kHz that can generally be heard only by young people, and another at 8 kHz that can be heard by most people. The maximum potential output sound pressure level is stated by the manufacturer to be 108 decibels (dB) (comparable in loudness to a live rock concert) and the manufacturer's product specification furthermore states that the sound can typically be heard by people below 25 years of age. The ability to hear high frequencies deteriorates in most humans with age (a condition known as presbycusis), typically observable by the age of 18.

== History ==
The Mosquito machine was invented and patented by Howard Stapleton in 2005, and was originally tested in Barry, Wales, where it was successful in reducing teenagers loitering near a grocery store. The idea was born after he was irritated by a factory noise when he was a child. The push to create the product was when Stapleton's 17-year-old daughter went to the store to buy milk and was harassed by a group of 12- to 15-year-olds. Using his children as test subjects, he determined the frequency of "The Mosquito".

The Mosquito was released to the mainstream market in 2005, through Stapleton's company Compound Security Solutions. The current device has two settings: the high frequency sound targeted at youth, and another that can be heard by everyone. The range of the sound is 140 feet (43 m) with the sound baffle, and 200 feet (61 m) without. It requires a 24-volt DC or 15-volt AC power supply.

A device installed in a Spar shop in Caerleon Road in Newport, South Wales was banned after three months by the Newport Community Safety Partnership, a partnership set up to meet the requirements of the Crime and Disorder Act 1998, with members including Newport City Council, Gwent Police, Newport Local Health Board, South Wales Fire Service, representatives of Customs and Excise, and the Welsh Assembly Government. Despite the ban, another Spar shop in Newport installed the device. A Newport Community Safety Partnership spokesman said: "Any view expressed by the Partnership does not stop any business or private company from purchasing these devices. They must ensure these systems comply with the law."

In February 2008, in response to a national campaign launched by the Children’s Commissioner for England, Liberty, and the National Youth Agency, the government issued a statement insisting that "'Mosquito alarms are not banned and the government has no plans to ban them".

=== Teen Buzz ringtone ===
The sound was made into a mobile phone ringtone, which could not be heard by teachers if the phone rang during a class. Mobile phone speakers are capable of producing frequencies above 20 kHz. This ringtone became informally known as "Teen Buzz" or "the Mosquito ringtone" and has since been sold commercially.

== Awards ==
The Mosquito won the satirical Ig Nobel for "peace" in 2006. The Ig Nobels celebrate the quirkier side of serious scientific endeavour, honouring "achievements that first make people laugh, and then make them think".

== Health effects ==
The German Federal Institute for Occupational Safety and Health stated in a report on The Mosquito, entitled Use of ultrasonic noise channels not entirely safe:

The results of the examination are now available. The auditors were not able to certify this device as completely safe. The risk to the target group of teenagers and young adults is relatively low. They can leave the area when they hear the sound. On the other hand small children and infants are especially at risk, due to lengthy exposure to the sound, because the adults themselves do not perceive the noise. Moreover, the ultrasound affects not only hearing. Disruption of the equilibrium senses, as well as other extra-aural effects are well known. With the sound levels that can be reached by the device, the onset of dizziness, headache, nausea and impairment is to be expected. This is not the limit of the total risks to safety and health.

In a 2001 United Kingdom survey of the relevant studies of adults exposed to high frequency sound in an occupational context for the Health and Safety Executive (HSE), it was concluded that the studies were inadequate to establish guidelines for safe exposure. The Mosquito's manufacturer relies on these inconclusive adult studies to justify the safety of the device.

The National Autistic Society said in 2008 that it was "extremely concerned" about possible harmful effects of the devices upon autistic people. Since autism can cause auditory hypersensitivity, autistic individuals can have more intense reactions to this sound, especially if they are also under 25. Since autism can also affect communication skills, some individuals may not be able to communicate their discomfort to caregivers. A supermarket in Longridge, England, removed a mosquito device in 2008 after a campaign by a 19-year-old Paul Brookfield, who is autistic. Brookfield stated that the device was causing him pain due to his hypersensitivity.

Other disabilities and conditions may be exacerbated by the device. In March 2009, a child who had recently undergone ear surgery reported that the device set off her tinnitus, causing significant pain.

== Reception ==
=== Support ===
The Mosquito has received support and endorsements from municipalities, school districts, property management companies, convenience stores and other organisations. Rochdale Safer Communities Partnership said the borough was committed to the continued use of the Mosquito:

"We feel totally justified in deploying Mosquito devices in the borough of Rochdale to give the community respite in cases of acute anti-social behaviour and youth nuisance," she said. "We use the devices when there are large groups of young people making life a problem for residents and businesses, as we are very keen not to let problems of anti-social behaviour escalate."

The Association of Convenience Stores (ACS) also supports the usage of the device, and so does British Retail Consortium (BRC), stating that "Not all young people are involved in violence, but given that some retail staff are facing a level of insolence [from teenagers] they have to have the option of doing what they can to protect themselves. They are entitled to discourage threatening groups from hanging around or in their shops."

At the Maple Ridge, Pitt Meadows and Vancouver west side school districts in British Columbia, Canada, the device has been credited with lowering exterior vandalism at one school by about 40%.

=== Opposition ===
Opposition categorises it as an indiscriminate sonic weapon which succeeds only in demonising children and young people and may breach their human rights. The National Youth Rights Association has met with some success fighting the devices in the United States.

A UK campaign called "Buzz off" is calling for The Mosquito to be banned. Shami Chakrabarti, director of Liberty, has claimed that the sound is "untested [and] unregulated" and that it can be a "sonic weapon directed against children and young people." Albert Aynsley-Green, the former Children's Commissioner for England, criticised the devices for indiscriminately targeting all children and babies regardless of their behaviour. He described such measures as "demonising children and young people", and creating a "dangerous and widening divide" between the young and the old.

The device was singled out for criticism in a joint report by children's commissioners for all parts of the UK, which formed part of a United Nations review of standards in the UK. A report for the Council of Europe called for a ban in 2010, suggesting use of the Mosquito may breach human rights law.

In January 2011, the device was banned on all Council and Partnership buildings in Sheffield following a successful campaign led by the then Member of UK Youth Parliament for Sheffield, Harrison Carter. Sheffield is the largest city in the country with such a ban in place. It was recognised by the UK Government in their Positive For Youth document, published by the Department for Education in January 2012. This strategy paper acts to set out a new-approach to cross government policy for young people aged 13–19. Although mentioned in the document, a national ban of the mosquito device was not in the Coalition Agreement, and is not part of current Government policy.

In July 2014, a new campaign was started in order to get a mosquito device removed from the public library in Milford Haven, Pembrokeshire. However, the campaign was unsuccessful.

In 2016, a shopping centre in Queensland, Australia removed the device after two years of campaigning by a local lawyer, due to it discriminating against young people. It had been installed in the centre for 10 years.

== Legal status ==
Campaigners and authorities in many countries have stated that they believe the device breaches human rights and may even constitute assault. Liberty has expressed concern that the device may violate articles 8 and 14 of the European Convention on Human Rights, and the United Kingdom's Human Rights Act 1998.

The Committee on Culture, Science and Education of the Parliamentary Assembly of the Council of Europe prepared a report stating that this device violates many articles of both the European Convention on Human Rights and the United Nations Convention on the Rights of the Child, and should be banned in Europe, because it is often "painful" and causes "degrading and discriminatory consequences for young people". In September 2008, Baroness Sarah Ludford MEP moved a motion to the European Parliament to ban the use of the Mosquito. It failed to get enough signatures from MEPs to proceed to a full debate.

In Belgium, a resolution was passed by the House in June 2008 asking the government to take all necessary measures to prohibit the use of devices like the Mosquito on Belgian territory. The legality of the device has also been tested in the French courts, where the Tribunal de Grande Instance de Saint-Brieuc prohibited the use of the Mosquito within its municipality, and ordered a private individual to pay €2,000 compensation after operating the device outside their house.

Under Ireland's Non-Fatal Offences Against the Person Act, 1997, anyone who "directly or indirectly applies force to or causes an impact on the body of another... without the consent of the other" (force including "application of ... noise or any other form of energy"), is guilty of committing assault. This issue has been raised in relation to the Mosquito device by Ireland's Ombudsman for Children following legal advice provided by Youth Work Ireland, but has yet to be tested in the Irish courts.

In the United Kingdom, the manufacturers claim that the tones are broadcast at 75 dB, meaning that the product falls within the government's auditory-safety limits, although the German news source Heise reported the device emits 85 dB. The government of the United Kingdom issued a statement in 2008 stating that "'Mosquito alarms' are not banned and the government has no plans to do so." The English county of Kent has chosen not to allow the usage of the Mosquito on council-owned buildings.

== See also ==
- Acoustic deterrent
- Presbycusis, the age-related hearing loss
- Hearing range
- Absolute threshold of hearing
- Tinnitus
- Hostile architecture
