= Federal Institute for Occupational Safety and Health =

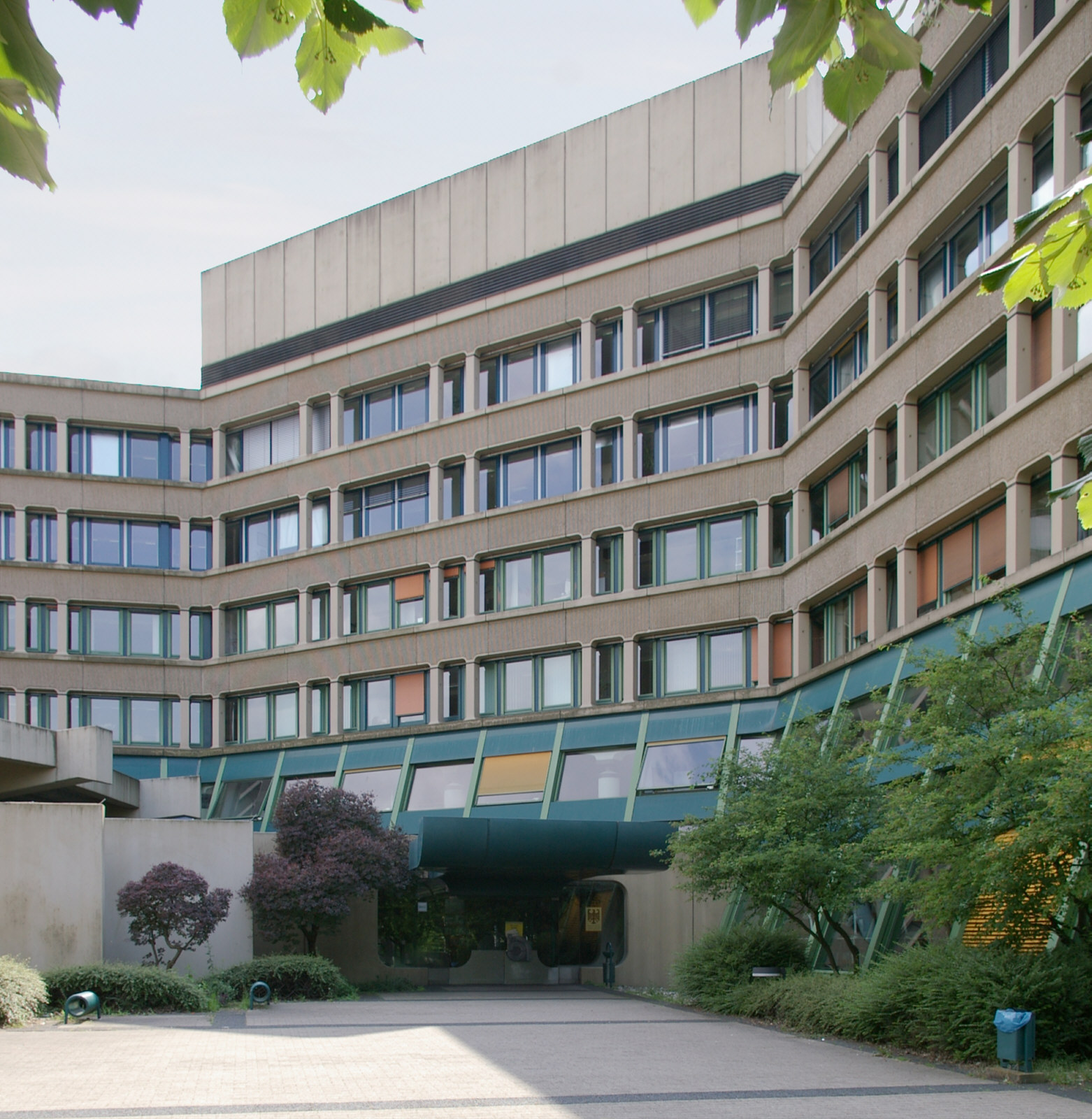
BAuA headquarters in Dortmund

The Federal Institute of Occupational Safety and Health (German: Bundesanstalt für Arbeitsschutz und Arbeitsmedizin, BAuA) is a German federal agency within the portfolio of the Federal Ministry of Labour and Social Affairs, with responsibility for occupational safety and health throughout Germany. It has its headquarters in Dortmund, and has locations in Berlin and Dresden, as well as an office in Chemnitz. Isabel Rothe has been the president of BAuA since November 2007.
