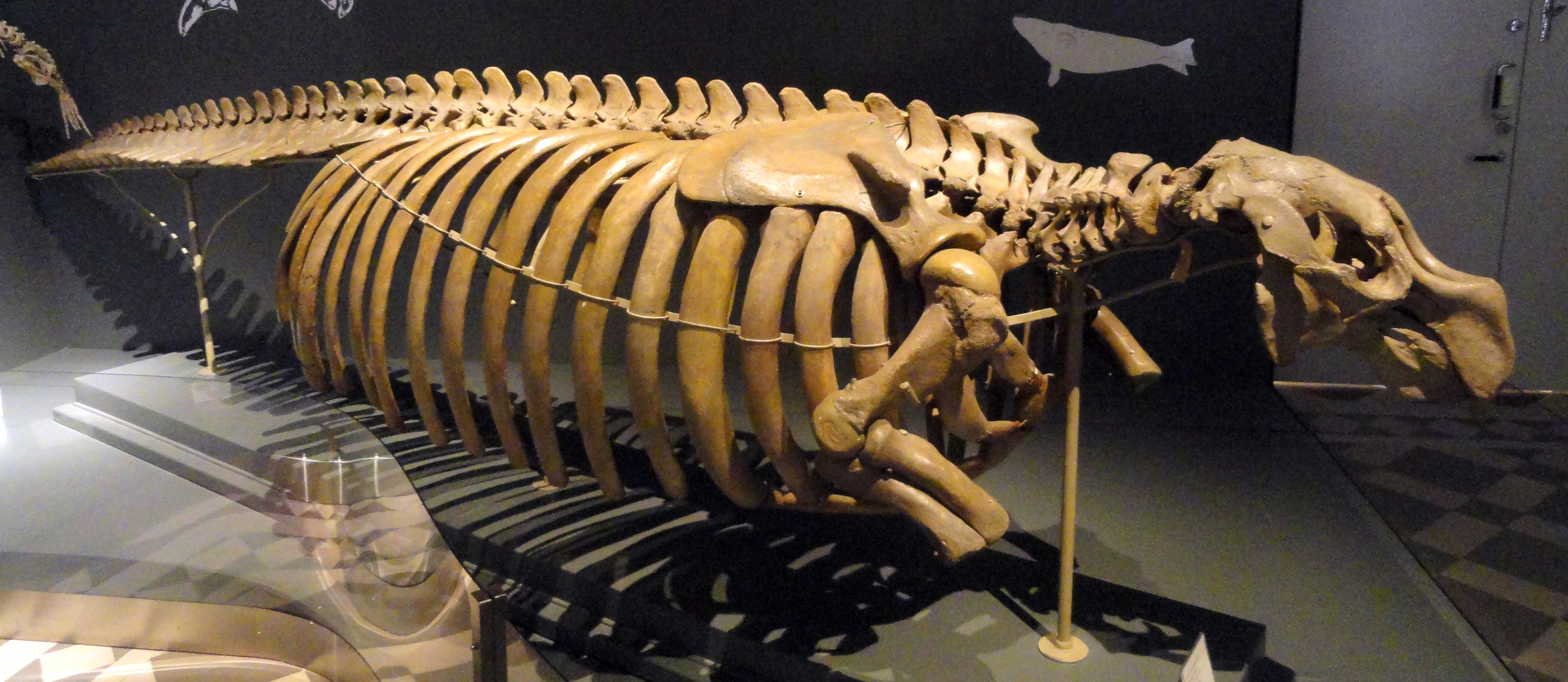
- Skeleton at the Finnish Museum of Natural History

Conservation status
- Extinct (1768) (IUCN 3.1)

Scientific classification
- Kingdom: Animalia
- Phylum: Chordata
- Class: Mammalia
- Order: Sirenia
- Family: Dugongidae
- Genus: †Hydrodamalis
- Species: †H. gigas

Binomial name
- †Hydrodamalis gigas (Zimmermann, 1780)

Synonyms
- List of synonyms: Hydrodamalis; H. stelleri Retzius, 1794; Rytina; R. manatus borealis Illiger, 1811; R. borealis Illiger, 1815; R. cetacea Illiger, 1815; R. stelleri Desmarest, 1819; R. borealis Cuvier, 1836; R. stelleri Burmeister, 1837; R. gigas Gray, 1850; Manati; M. gigas Zimmermann, 1780; M. balaenurus Boddaert, 1785; M. borealis Link, 1795; Trichechus; T. manatus borealis Gmelin, 1788; T. borealis Shaw, 1800; Sirene; S. borealis Link, 1794; Nepus; N. stelleri Fischer, 1814; Stellerus; S. borealis Desmarest, 1822; Haligyna; H. borealis Billberg, 1827; Manatus; M. gigas Lucas, 1891

= Steller's sea cow =

Steller's sea cow Temporal range: Pleistocene– C. E. 1768

Extinct species of marine mammal

Steller's sea cow (Hydrodamalis gigas) is an extinct sirenian described by Georg Wilhelm Steller in 1741. At that time, it was found only around the Commander Islands in the Bering Sea between Alaska and Russia; its range extended across the North Pacific during the Pleistocene epoch, and likely contracted to such an extreme degree due to the glacial cycle. It is possible that indigenous populations interacted with the animal before Europeans. Steller first encountered it on Vitus Bering's Great Northern Expedition when the crew became shipwrecked on Bering Island. Much of what is known about its behavior comes from Steller's observations on the island, documented in his posthumous publication On the Beasts of the Sea. Within 27 years of its discovery by Europeans, the slow-moving and easily caught mammal was hunted into extinction for its meat, fat, and hide.

Some 18th-century adults would have reached weights of 8–10 t (8.8–11.0 short tons) and lengths up to 9 m (30 ft). It was a member of the family Dugongidae, of which the 3 m (9.8 ft) long dugong (Dugong dugon) is the sole living member. It had a thicker layer of blubber than other members of the order, an adaptation to the cold waters of its environment. Its tail was forked, like that of whales or dugongs. Lacking true teeth, it had an array of white bristles on its upper lip and two keratinous plates within its mouth for chewing. It fed mainly on kelp, and communicated with sighs and snorting sounds. Steller believed it was a monogamous and social animal living in small family groups and raising its young, similar to modern sirenians.

== Description ==
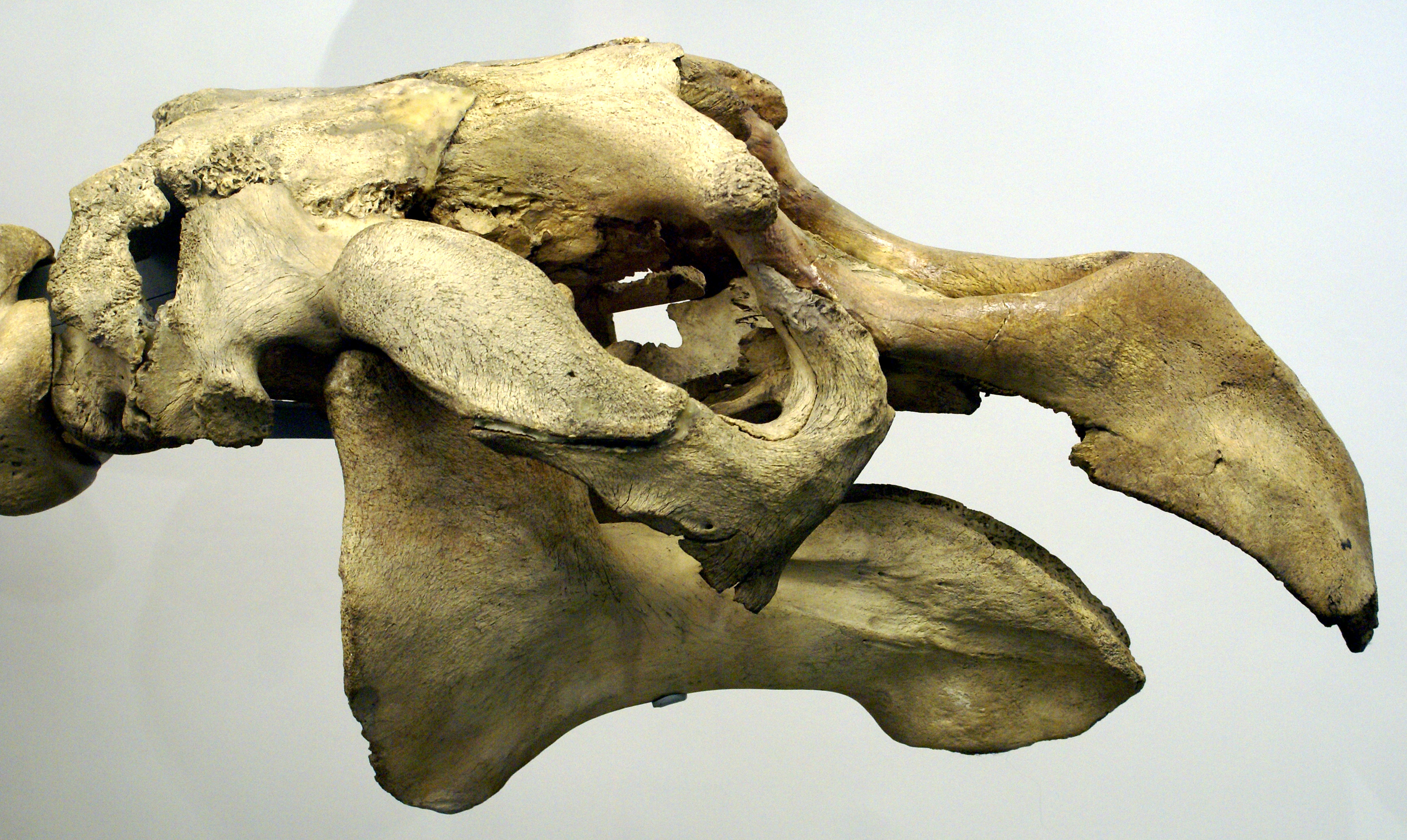
The skull of a Steller's sea cow, Natural History Museum of London

Steller's sea cows are reported to have grown to 8 to 9 m (26 to 30 ft) long as adults, much larger than extant sirenians. In 1987, a rather complete skeleton was found on Bering Island measuring 3 m (9.8 ft). In 2017, another such skeleton was found on Bering Island measuring 5.2 m (17 ft), and in life probably about 6 m (20 ft). Georg Steller's writings contain two contradictory estimates of weight: 4 and 24.3 t (4.4 and 26.8 short tons). The true value is estimated to fall between these figures, at about 8–10 t (8.8–11.0 short tons). This size made the sea cow one of the largest mammals of the Holocene epoch, along with baleen whales and some few toothed whales, and was likely an adaptation to reduce its surface-area to volume ratio and conserve heat.

Unlike other sirenians, Steller's sea cow was positively buoyant, meaning that it was unable to submerge completely. It had a very thick outer skin, 2.5 cm (1 in), to prevent injury from sharp rocks and ice and possibly to prevent unsubmerged skin from drying out. The sea cow's blubber was 8–10 cm (3–4 in) thick, another adaptation to the frigid climate of the Bering Sea. Its skin was brownish-black, with white patches on some individuals. It was smooth along its back and rough on its sides, with crater-like depressions most likely caused by parasites. This rough texture led to the animal being nicknamed the "bark animal". Hair on its body was sparse, but the insides of the sea cow's flippers were covered in bristles. The fore limbs were roughly 67 cm (26 in) long, and the tail fluke was forked.

The sea cow's head was small and short in comparison to its huge body. The animal's upper lip was large and broad, extending so far beyond the lower jaw that the mouth appeared to be located underneath the skull. Unlike other sirenians, Steller's sea cow was toothless and instead had a dense array of interlacing white bristles on its upper lip. The bristles were about 3.8 cm (1.5 in) in length and were used to tear seaweed stalks and hold food. The sea cow also had two keratinous plates, called ceratodontes, located on its palate and mandible, used for chewing. According to Steller, these plates (or "masticatory pads") were held together by interdental papillae, a part of the gums, and had many small holes containing nerves and arteries.

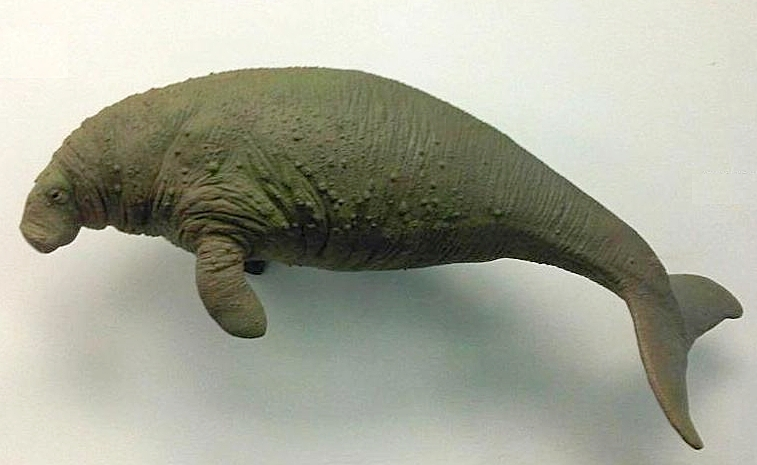
Model in the Natural History Museum, London

As with all sirenians, the sea cow's snout pointed downwards, which allowed it to better grasp kelp. The sea cow's nostrils were roughly 5 cm (2 in) long and wide. In addition to those within its mouth, the sea cow also had stiff bristles 10–12.7 cm (3.9–5.0 in) long protruding from its muzzle. Steller's sea cow had small eyes located halfway between its nostrils and ears with black irises, livid eyeballs, and canthi which were not externally visible. The animal had no eyelashes, but like other diving creatures such as sea otters, Steller's sea cow had a nictitating membrane, which covered its eyes to prevent injury while feeding. The tongue was small and remained in the back of the mouth, unable to reach the masticatory (chewing) pads.

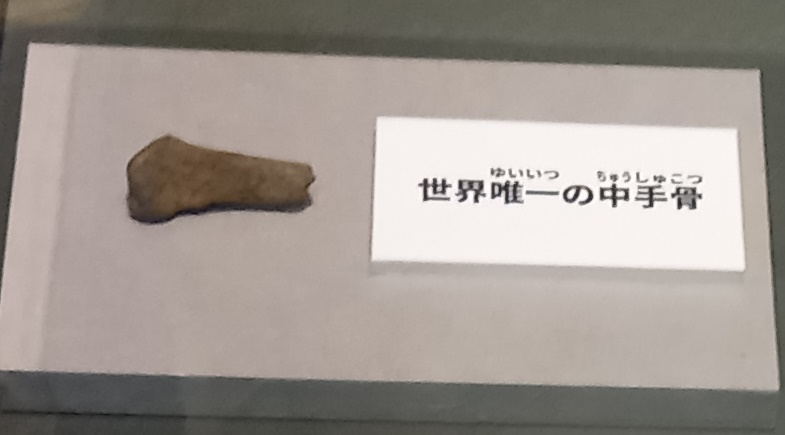
Metacarpal bone of H. cf. gigas from Japan under study

The sea cow's spine is believed to have had seven cervical (neck), 17 thoracic, three lumbar, and 34 caudal (tail) vertebrae. Its ribs were large, with five of 17 pairs making contact with the sternum; it had no clavicles. As in all sirenians, the scapula of Steller's sea cow was fan-shaped, being larger on the posterior side and narrower towards the neck. The anterior border of the scapula was nearly straight, whereas those of modern sirenians are curved. Like other sirenians, the bones of Steller's sea cow were pachyosteosclerotic, meaning they were both bulky (pachyostotic) and dense (osteosclerotic). In all collected skeletons of the sea cow, the manus is missing; since Dusisiren—the sister taxon of Hydrodamalis—had reduced phalanges (finger bones), Steller's sea cow possibly did not have a manus at all. The only specimen with preserved bones from the wrist down is a specimen under study found in Komae, Tokyo, Japan, which preserve a fragment of metacarpal bone.

The sea cow's heart was 16 kg (35 lb) in weight; its stomach measured 1.8 m (6 ft) long and 1.5 m (5 ft) wide. The full length of its intestinal tract was about 151 m (500 ft), equaling more than 20 times the animal's length. The sea cow had no gallbladder, but did have a wide common bile duct. Its anus was 10 cm (0.33 ft) in width, with its feces resembling those of horses. The male's penis was 80 cm (2.6 ft) long. Genetic evidence indicates convergent evolution with other marine mammals of genes related to metabolic and immune function, including leptin associated with energy homeostasis and reproductive regulation.

== Ecology and behavior ==
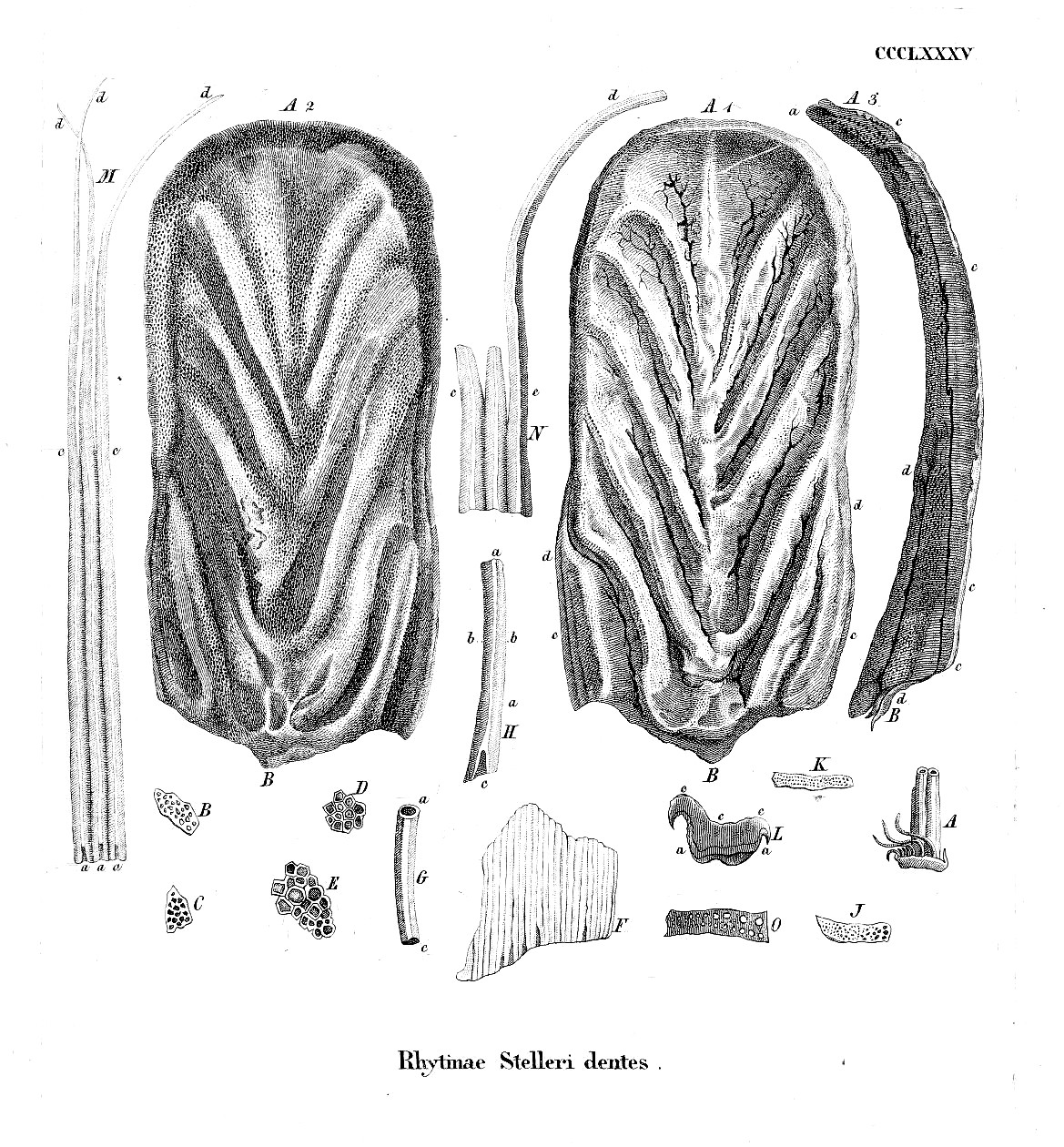
Illustrations of the dentition of Steller's sea cow by Johann Christian Daniel von Schreber, mid-1800s

Whether Steller's sea cow had any natural predators is unknown. It may have been hunted by killer whales and sharks, though its buoyancy may have made it difficult for killer whales to drown, and the rocky kelp forests in which the sea cow lived may have deterred sharks. According to Steller, the adults guarded the young from predators.

Steller described an ectoparasite on the sea cows that was similar to the whale louse (Cyamus ovalis), but the parasite remains unidentified due to the host's extinction and loss of all original specimens collected by Steller. It was first formally described as Sirenocyamus rhytinae in 1846 by Johann Friedrich von Brandt, although it has since been placed into the genus Cyamus as Cyamus rhytinae. It was the only species of cyamid amphipod to be reported inhabiting a sirenian. Steller also identified an endoparasite in the sea cows, which was likely an ascarid nematode.

Like other sirenians, Steller's sea cow was an obligate herbivore and spent most of the day feeding, only lifting its head every 4–5 minutes for breathing. Kelp was its main food source, making it an algivore. The sea cow likely fed on several species of kelp, which have been identified as Agarum spp., Alaria praelonga, Halosaccion glandiforme, Laminaria saccharina, Nereocyctis luetkeana, and Thalassiophyllum clathrus. Steller's sea cow only fed directly on the soft parts of the kelp, which caused the tougher stem and holdfast to wash up on the shore in heaps. The sea cow may have also fed on seagrass, but the plant was not common enough to support a viable population and could not have been the sea cow's primary food source. Further, the available seagrasses in the sea cow's range (Phyllospadix spp. and Zostera marina) may have grown too deep underwater or been too tough for the animal to consume. Since the sea cow floated, it likely fed on canopy kelp, as it is believed to have only had access to food no deeper than 1 m (3.3 ft) below the tide. Kelp releases a chemical deterrent to protect it from grazing, but canopy kelp releases a lower concentration of the chemical, allowing the sea cow to graze safely. Steller noted that the sea cow grew thin during the frigid winters, indicating a period of fasting due to low kelp growth. Fossils of Pleistocene sea cow populations from the Aleutian Islands were larger than those from the Commander Islands, indicating that the growth of Commander Island sea cows may have been stunted due to a less favorable habitat and less food than the warmer Aleutian Islands.

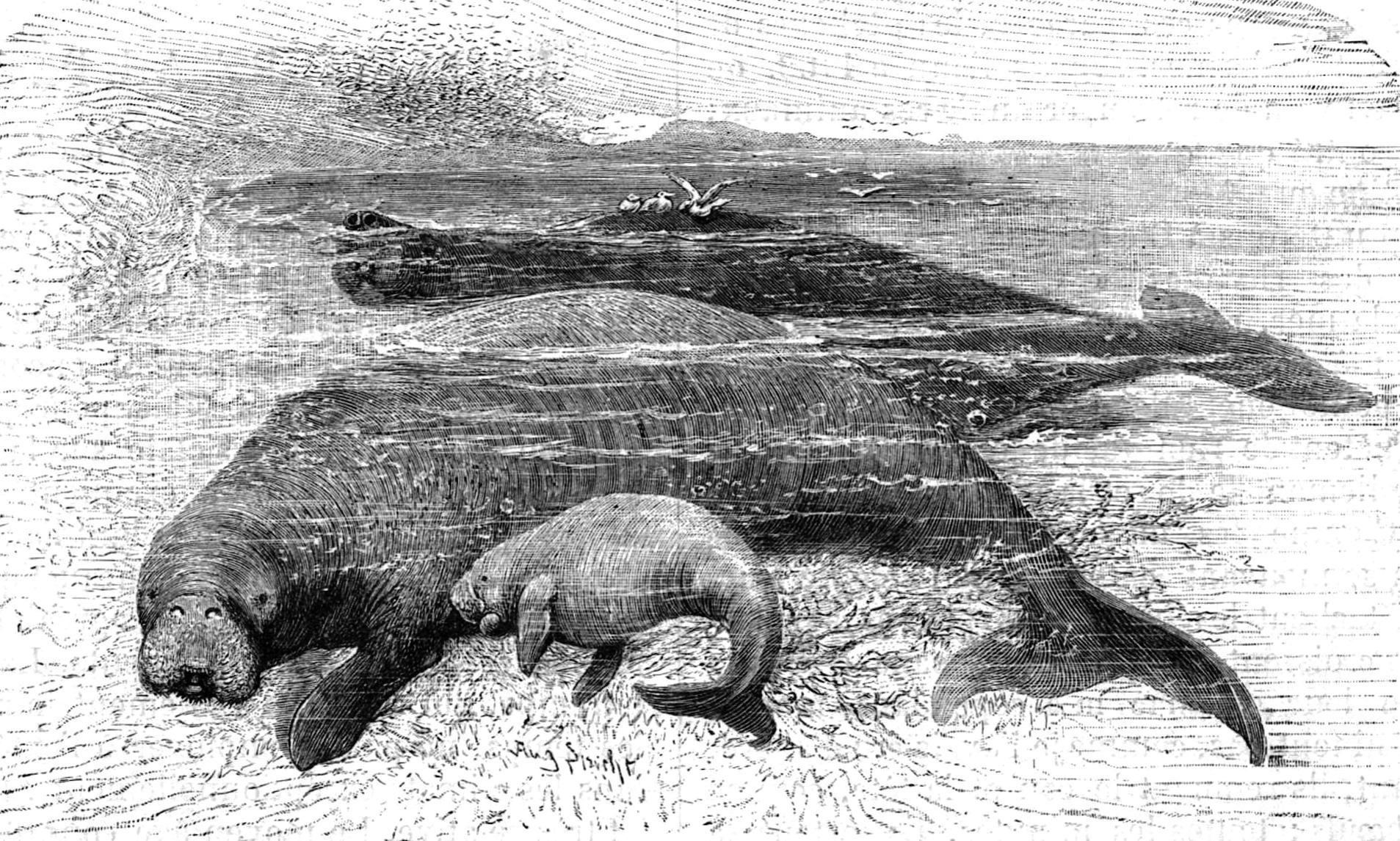
1898 illustration of a Steller's sea cow family

Steller described the sea cow as being highly social (gregarious). It lived in small family groups and helped injured members, and was also apparently monogamous. Steller's sea cow may have exhibited parental care, and the young were kept at the front of the herd for protection against predators. Steller reported that as a female was being captured, a group of other sea cows attacked the hunting boat by ramming and rocking it, and after the hunt, her mate followed the boat to shore, even after the captured animal had died. Mating season occurred in early spring and gestation took a little over a year, with calves likely delivered in autumn, as Steller observed a greater number of calves in autumn than at any other time of the year. Since female sea cows had only one set of mammary glands, they likely had one calf at a time.

The sea cow used its fore limbs for swimming, feeding, walking in shallow water, defending itself, and holding on to its partner during copulation. According to Steller, the fore limbs were also used to anchor the sea cow down to prevent it from being swept away by the strong nearshore waves. While grazing, the sea cow progressed slowly by moving its tail (fluke) from side to side; more rapid movement was achieved by strong vertical beating of the tail. They often slept on their backs after feeding. According to Steller, the sea cow was nearly mute and made only heavy breathing sounds, raspy snorting similar to a horse, and sighs.

Despite their large size, as with many other marine megafauna in the region, Steller's sea cows may have been prey for the local transient orcas (Orcinus orca); it is likely that they experienced predation, as Steller observed that foraging sea cows with calves would always keep their calves between themselves and the shore, and orcas would have been the most likely candidate for causing this behavior. In addition, early indigenous peoples of the North Pacific may have depended on the sea cow for food, and it is possible that this dependency may have extirpated the sea cow from portions of the North Pacific aside from the Commander Islands. Steller's sea cows may have also had a mutualistic (or possibly even parasitic) relationship with local seabird species; Steller often observed birds perching on the exposed backs of the sea cows, feeding on the parasitic Cyamus rhytinae; this unique relationship that disappeared with the sea cows may have been a food source for many birds, and is similar to the recorded interactions between oxpeckers (Buphagus) and extant African megafauna.

== Taxonomy ==
=== Phylogeny ===
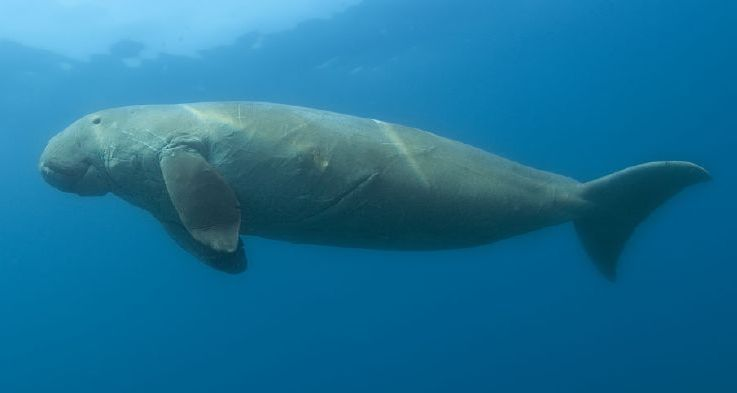
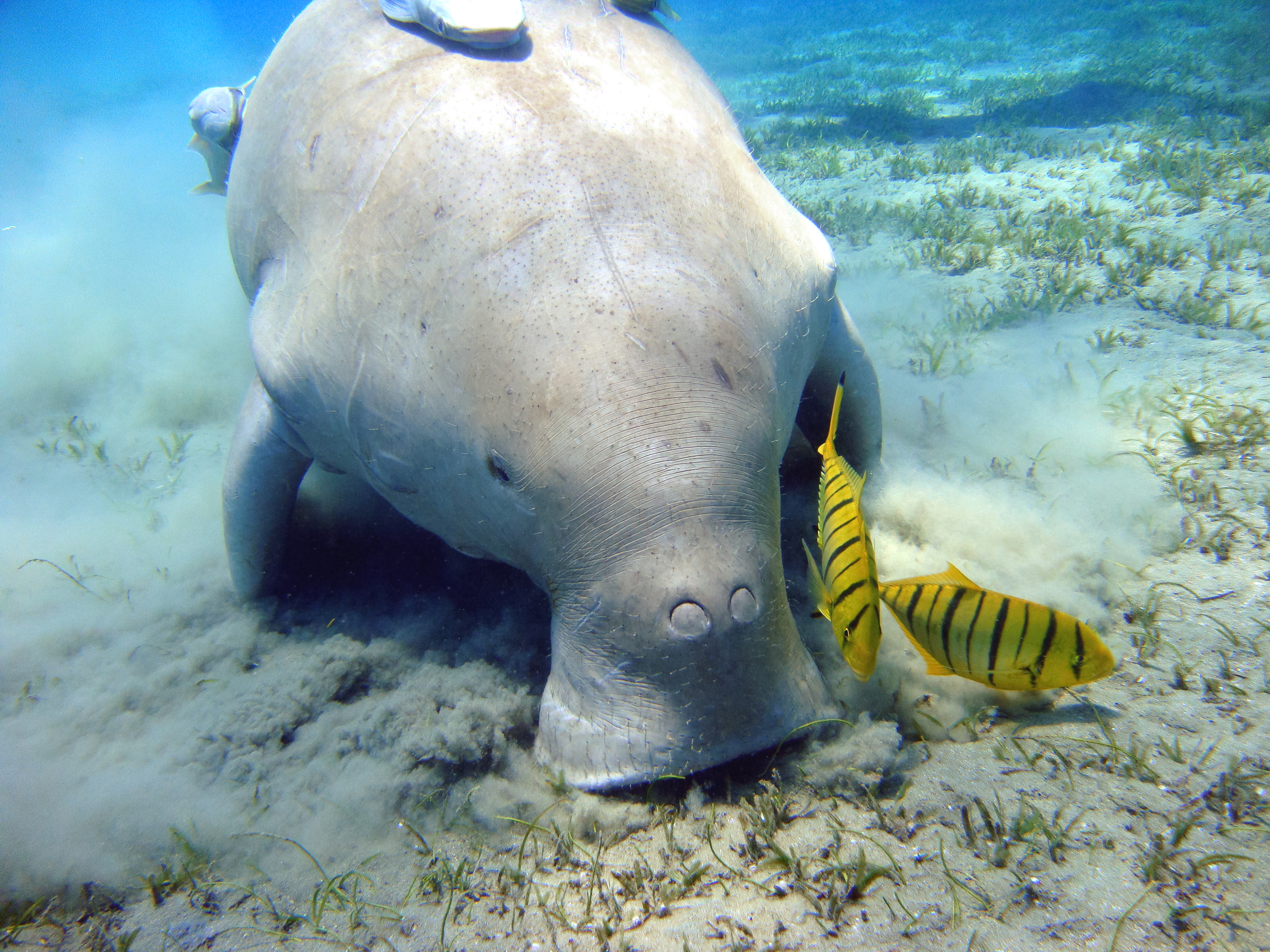
The closely related dugong

Steller's sea cow was a member of the genus Hydrodamalis, a group of large sirenians, whose sister taxon was Dusisiren. Like those of Steller's sea cow, the ancestors of Dusisiren lived in tropical mangroves before adapting to the cold climates of the North Pacific. Hydrodamalis and Dusisiren are classified together in the subfamily Hydrodamalinae, which diverged from other sirenians around 4 to 8 mya. Steller's sea cow is a member of the family Dugongidae, the sole surviving member of which, and thus Steller's sea cow's closest living relative is the dugong (Dugong dugon).

Steller's sea cow was a direct descendant of the Cuesta sea cow (H. cuestae), an extinct tropical sea cow that lived off the coast of western North America, particularly California. The Cuesta sea cow is thought to have become extinct due to the onset of the Quaternary glaciation and the subsequent cooling of the oceans. Many populations died out, but the lineage of Steller's sea cow was able to adapt to the colder temperatures. The Takikawa sea cow (H. spissa) of Japan is thought of by some researchers to be a taxonomic synonym of the Cuesta sea cow, but based on a comparison of endocasts, the Takikawa and Steller's sea cows are more derived than the Cuesta sea cow. This has led some to believe that the Takikawa sea cow is its own species. The evolution of the genus Hydrodamalis was characterized by increased size, and a loss of teeth and phalanges, as a response to the onset of the Quaternary glaciation.

Based on a 2015 study by Mark Springer:

- Sirenia
  - - - †Anomotherium langewieschei
      - †Miosiren kocki
    - - Trichechus inunguis
      - - Trichechus manatus
        - Trichechus senegalensis
  - - †Eotheroides aegyptiacum
    - - †Halitherium schinzii
      - - †Priscosiren atlantica
        - - Dugong dugon
        - - †Metaxytherium krahuletzi
          - - †Metaxytherium serresii
            - †Metaxytherium medium
            - †Metaxytherium floridanum
            - †Metaxytherium crataegense
            - - †Metaxytherium arctodites
              - - †Dusisiren jordani
                - - †Hydrodamalis cuestae
                  - †Hydrodamalis gigas

Based on a 2004 study by Hitoshi Furusawa:

- Sirenia
  - †Dusisiren reinharti
  - - †Dusisiren jordani
    - - †Dusisiren dewana
      - - †Dusisiren takasatensis
        - - †Hydrodamalis cuestae
          - - †Hydrodamalis spissa
            - - †Hydrodamalis gigas

=== Research history ===
Steller's sea cow was discovered in 1741 by Georg Wilhelm Steller, and was named after him. Steller researched the wildlife of Bering Island while he was shipwrecked there for about a year; the animals on the island included relict populations of sea cows, sea otters, Steller sea lions, and northern fur seals. As the crew hunted the animals to survive, Steller described them in detail. Steller's account was included in his posthumous publication De bestiis marinis, or The Beasts of the Sea, which was published in 1751 by the Russian Academy of Sciences in Saint Petersburg. Zoologist Eberhard von Zimmermann formally described Steller's sea cow in 1780 as Manati gigas. Biologist Anders Jahan Retzius in 1794 put the sea cow in the new genus Hydrodamalis, with the specific name of stelleri, in honor of Steller. In 1811, naturalist Johann Karl Wilhelm Illiger reclassified Steller's sea cow into the genus Rytina, which many writers at the time adopted. The name Hydrodamalis gigas, the correct combinatio nova if a separate genus is recognised, was first used in 1895 by Theodore Sherman Palmer.

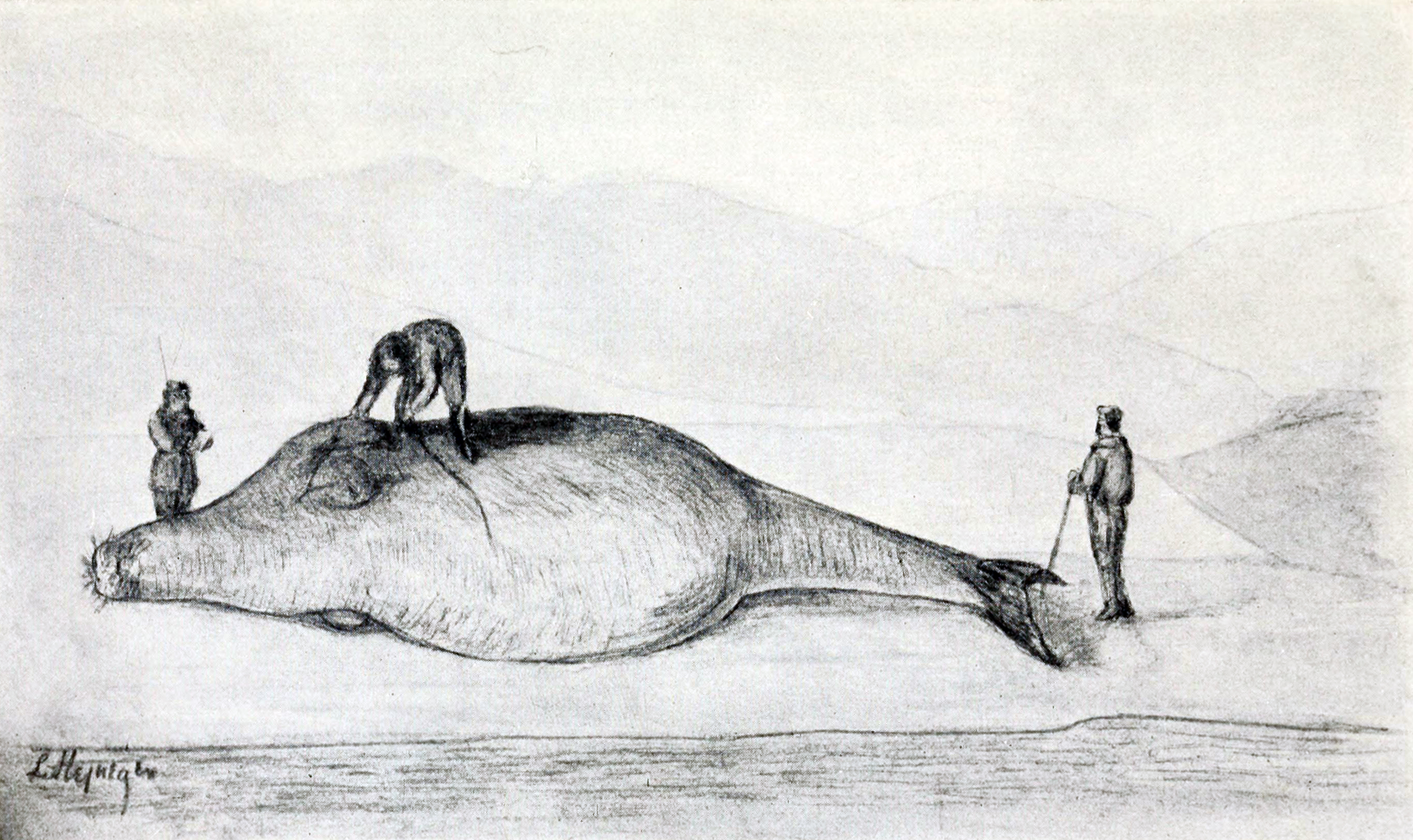
Stejneger's 1925 reconstruction of G. W. Steller measuring a sea cow in 1742

For decades after its discovery, no skeletal remains of a Steller's sea cow were known. This may have been due to rising and falling sea levels over the course of the Quaternary period, which could have left many sea cow bones hidden. The first bones of a Steller's sea cow were unearthed in about 1840, over 70 years after it was presumed to have become extinct. The first partial sea cow skull was discovered in 1844 by Ilya Voznesensky while on the Commander Islands, and the first skeleton was discovered in 1855 on northern Bering Island. These specimens were sent to Saint Petersburg in 1857, and another nearly complete skeleton arrived in Moscow around 1860. Until recently, all the full skeletons were found during the 19th century, being the most productive period in terms of unearthed skeletal remains, from 1878 to 1883. During this time, 12 of the 22 skeletons having known dates of collection were discovered. Some authors did not believe possible the recovery of further significant skeletal material from the Commander Islands after this period, but a skeleton was found in 1983, and two zoologists collected about 90 bones in 1991. Only two to four skeletons of the sea cow exhibited in various museums of the world originate from a single individual. It is known that Adolf Erik Nordenskiöld, Benedykt Dybowski, and Leonhard Hess Stejneger unearthed many skeletal remains from different individuals in the late 1800s, from which composite skeletons were assembled. As of 2006, 27 nearly complete skeletons and 62 complete skulls have been found, but most of them are assemblages of bones from two to 16 different individuals.

=== Illustrations ===
The Pallas Picture is the only known drawing of Steller's sea cow believed to be from a complete specimen. It was published by Peter Simon Pallas in his 1840 work Icones ad Zoographia Rosso-Asiatica. Pallas did not specify a source; Stejneger suggested it may have been one of the original illustrations produced by Friedrich Plenisner, a member of Vitus Bering's crew as a painter and surveyor who drew a figure of a female sea cow on Steller's request. Most of Plenisner's depictions were lost during transit from Siberia to Saint Petersburg.

Another drawing of Steller's sea cow similar to the Pallas Picture appeared on a 1744 map drawn by Sven Waxell and Sofron Chitrow. The picture may have also been based upon a specimen, and was published in 1893 by Pekarski. The map depicted Vitus Bering's route during the Great Northern Expedition, and featured illustrations of Steller's sea cow and Steller's sea lion in the upper-left corner. The drawing contains some inaccurate features such as the inclusion of eyelids and fingers, leading to doubt that it was drawn from a specimen.

Johann Friedrich von Brandt, director of the Russian Academy of Sciences, had the "Ideal Image" drawn in 1846 based upon the Pallas Picture, and then the "Ideal Picture" in 1868 based upon collected skeletons. Two other possible drawings of Steller's sea cow were found in 1891 in Waxell's manuscript diary. There was a map depicting a sea cow, as well as a Steller sea lion and a northern fur seal. The sea cow was depicted with large eyes, a large head, claw-like hands, exaggerated folds on the body, and a tail fluke in perspective lying horizontally rather than vertically. The drawing may have been a distorted depiction of a juvenile, as the figure bears a resemblance to a manatee calf. Another similar image was found by Alexander von Middendorff in 1867 in the library of the Russian Academy of Sciences, and is probably a copy of the Tsarskoye Selo Picture.

Early depictions of Steller's sea cow
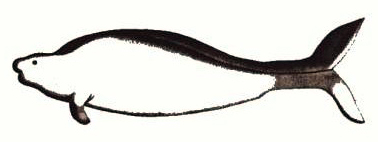
The Pallas Picture: the only surviving drawing of Steller's sea cow by Friedrich Plenisner, and possibly the only one drawn from a complete specimen (1840)

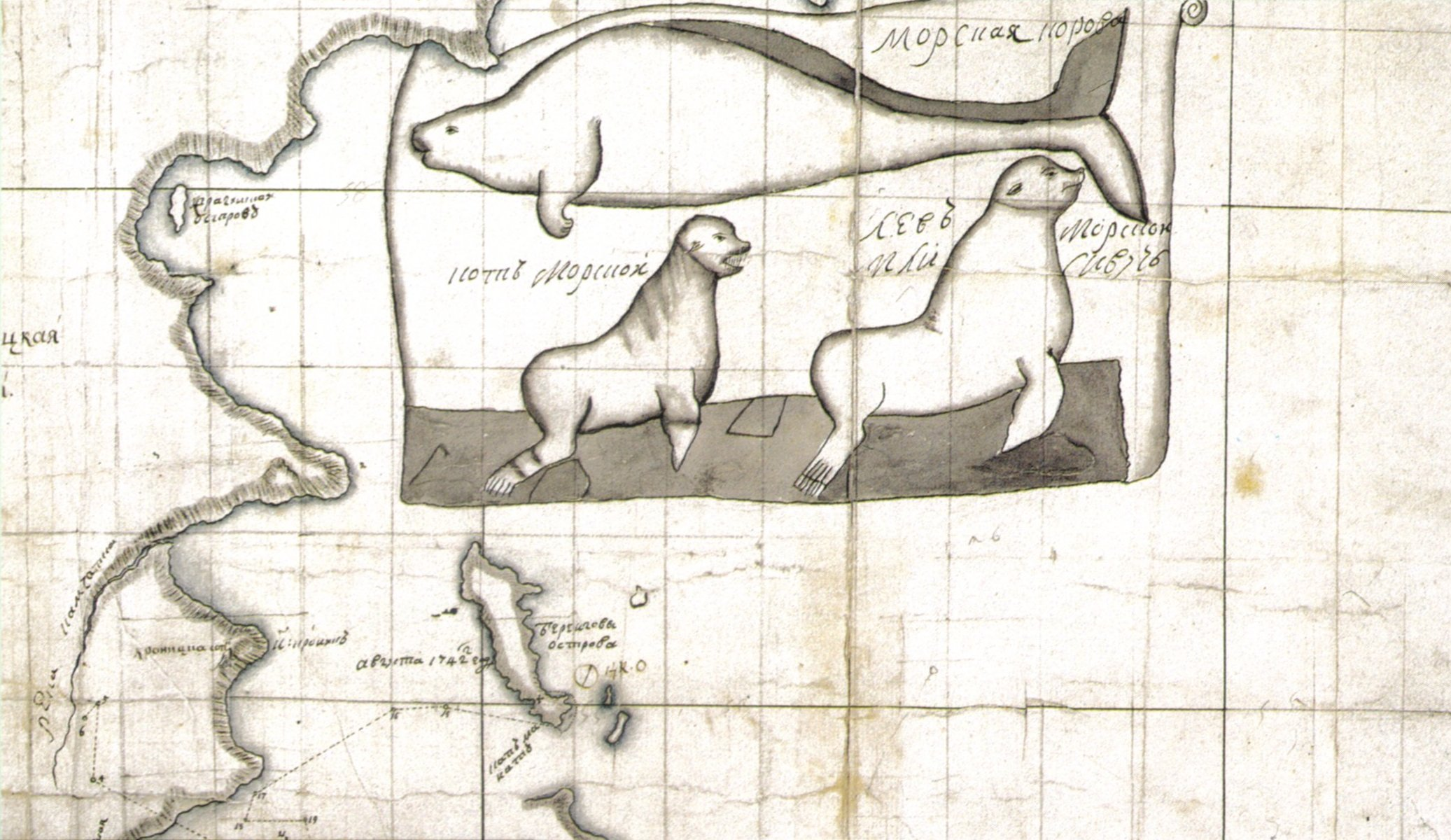
The Pekarski Picture: a map of the Commander Islands including illustrations of Steller's sea cow and the Steller sea lion by a crew member of Vitus Bering's Great Northern Expedition (1893)

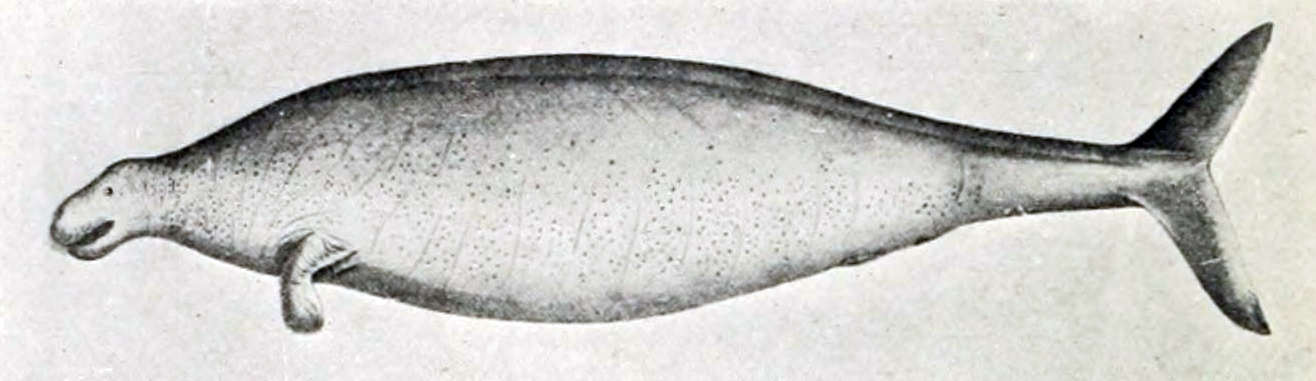
The Ideal Image by Johann Friedrich von Brandt based on the Pallas Picture (1846)

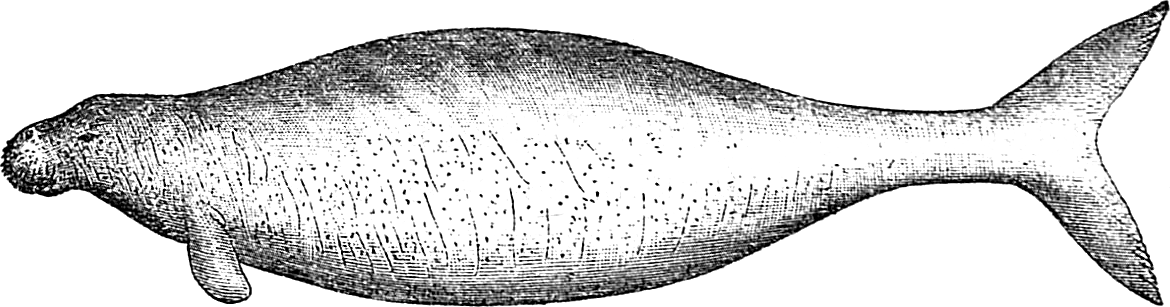
The Ideal Picture by Johann Friedrich von Brandt based on the Pallas Picture and skeletons (1868)

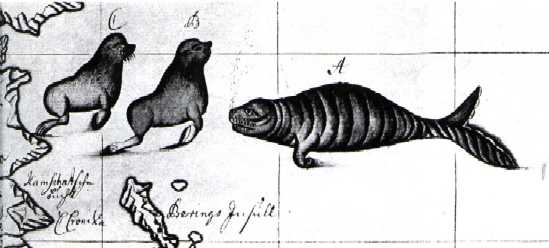
The Tsarskoye Selo Picture: a map of the Commander Islands, including illustrations of Steller's sea cow, the Steller sea lion, and the northern fur seal, by Sven Waxell (1891); the tail is lying flat on the ground in perspective.

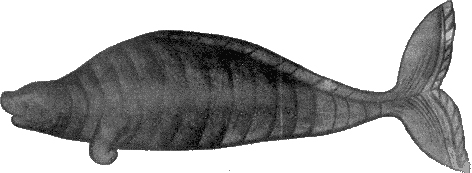
The second Tsarskoye Selo Picture by Sven Waxell (1891)

== Range ==
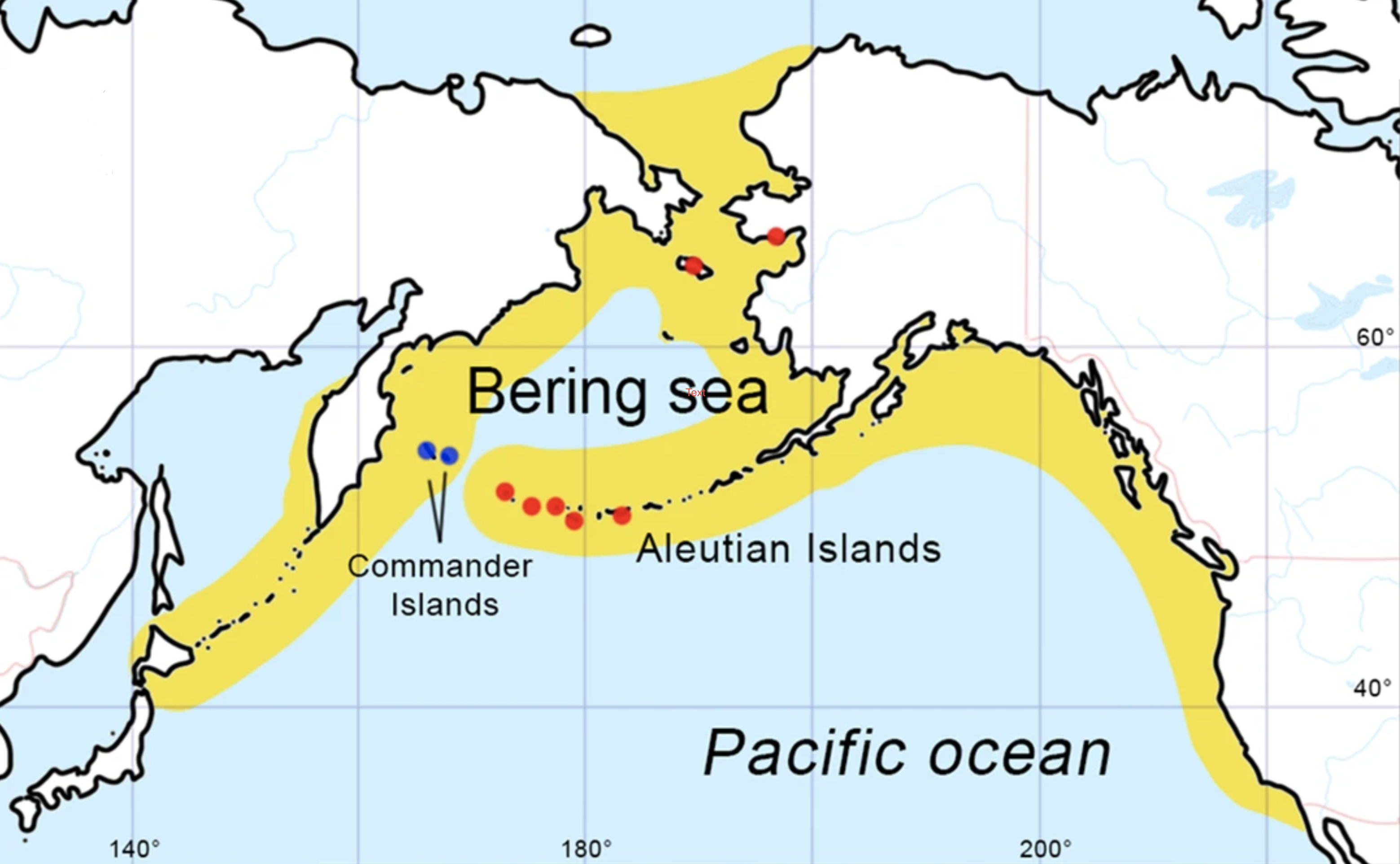
Steller's sea cow distribution; yellow during the Pleistocene; red for archaeological evidence; and blue for historical records

The range of Steller's sea cow at the time of its discovery was apparently restricted to the shallow seas around the Commander Islands, which include Bering and Copper Islands. The Commander Islands remained uninhabited until 1825, when the Russian-American Company relocated Aleuts from Attu Island and Atka Island there.

The first fossils discovered outside the Commander Islands were found in interglacial Pleistocene deposits in Amchitka, and further fossils dating to the late Pleistocene were found in Monterey Bay, California, and Honshu, Japan. This suggests that the sea cow had a far more extensive range in prehistoric times, but the possibility that these fossils belong to other Hydrodamalis species cannot be excluded. The southernmost find is a Middle Pleistocene rib bone from the Bōsō Peninsula of Japan. The remains of three individuals were found preserved in the South Bight Formation of Amchitka; as late Pleistocene interglacial deposits are rare in the Aleutians, the discovery suggests that sea cows were abundant during that era. According to Steller, the sea cow often resided in the shallow, sandy shorelines and in the mouths of freshwater rivers. Genetic evidence suggests that Steller's sea cow, as well as the modern dugong, suffered a population bottleneck (a significant reduction in population) bottoming roughly 400,000 years ago.

Bone fragments and accounts by native Aleut people suggest that sea cows also historically inhabited the Near Islands, possibly with viable populations that were in contact with humans in the western Aleutian Islands prior to Steller's discovery in 1741. A sea cow rib discovered in 1998 on Kiska Island was dated to around 1,000 years old, and is now in the possession of the Burke Museum in Seattle; the dating may be skewed due to the marine reservoir effect, which causes radiocarbon-dated marine specimens to appear several hundred years older than they are (marine reservoir effect is caused by the large reserves of C^{14} in the ocean, and it is more likely that the animal died between 1710 and 1785). A 2004 study reported that sea cow bones discovered on Adak Island were around 1,700 years old, and sea cow bones discovered on Buldir Island were found to be around 1,600 years old. It is possible that these bones were from cetaceans and were misclassified. Rib bones of a Steller's sea cow have also been found on St. Lawrence Island, from a specimen that is thought to have lived between 800 and 920 CE.

== Interactions with humans ==
=== Extinction ===
Genetic evidence suggests the Steller's sea cows around the Commander Islands were the last of a much more ubiquitous population dispersed across the North Pacific coastal zones. They had the same genetic diversity as the last and rather inbred population of woolly mammoths on Wrangel Island. During glacial periods and reduction in sea levels and temperatures, suitable habitat substantially regressed, fragmenting the population. By the time sea levels stabilized around 5,000 years ago, the population had already plummeted. Together, these indicate that even without human influence, the Steller's sea cow would have still been a dead clade walking, with the vast majority of the population having already gone extinct from natural climatic and sea level shifts, with the tiny remaining population at major risk from a genetic extinction vortex.

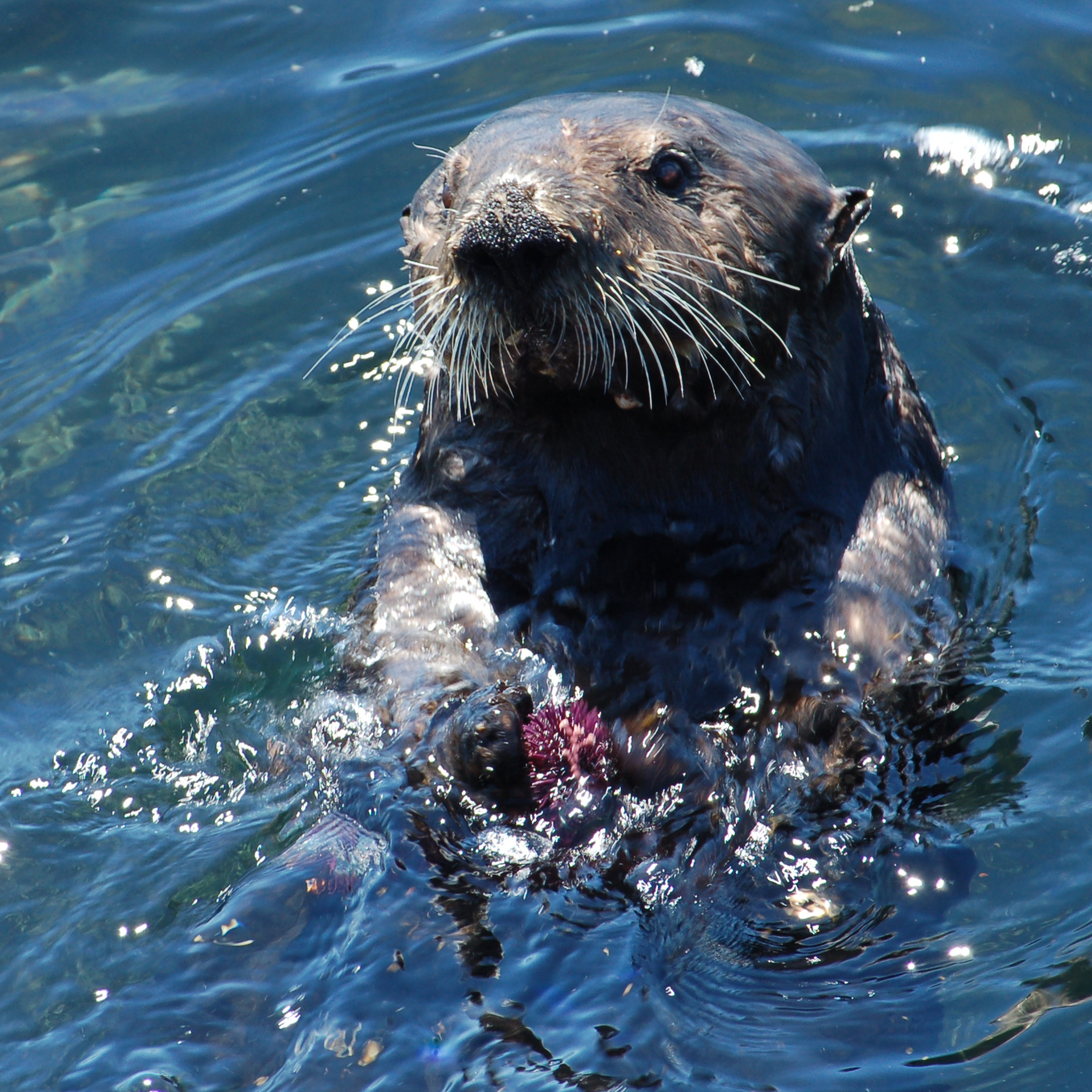
The sea otter is a keystone species and keeps sea urchin populations in check. Its depopulation in the Aleutian Islands may have led to the decline of kelp and subsequently of sea cows.

The presence of Steller's sea cows in the Aleutian Islands may have caused the Aleut people to migrate westward to hunt them. This possibly led to the sea cow's extirpation in that area, assuming it had not already happened yet, but the archaeological evidence is inconclusive. One factor potentially leading to extinction of Steller's sea cow, specifically off the coast of St. Lawrence Island, was the Siberian Yupik people who have inhabited St. Lawrence island for 2,000 years. They may have hunted the sea cows into extinction, as the natives have a dietary culture heavily dependent upon marine mammals. The onset of the Medieval Warm Period, which reduced the availability of kelp, may have also been the cause for their local extinction in that area. It has also been argued that the decline of Steller's sea cow may have been an indirect effect of the harvesting of sea otters by the area's aboriginal people. With the otter population reduced, the sea urchin population would have increased, in turn reducing the stock of kelp, its principal food. In historic times, though, aboriginal hunting had depleted sea otter populations only in localized areas, and as the sea cow would have been easy prey for aboriginal hunters, accessible populations may have been exterminated with or without simultaneous otter hunting. In any event, the range of the sea cow was limited to coastal areas off uninhabited islands by the time Bering arrived, and the animal was already endangered.

When Europeans discovered them, there may have been only 2,000 individuals left. This small population was quickly wiped out by fur traders, seal hunters, and others who followed Vitus Bering's route past its habitat to Alaska. It was also hunted to collect its valuable subcutaneous fat. The animal was hunted and used by Ivan Krassilnikov in 1754 and Ivan Korovin 1762, but Dimitri Bragin, in 1772, and others later, did not see it. Brandt thus concluded that by 1768, twenty-seven years after it had been discovered by Europeans, the species was extinct. In 1887, Stejneger estimated that there had been fewer than 1,500 individuals remaining at the time of Steller's discovery, and argued there was already an immediate danger of the sea cow's extinction.

The first attempt to hunt the animal by Steller and the other crew members was unsuccessful due to its strength and thick hide. They had attempted to impale it and haul it to shore using a large hook and heavy cable, but the crew could not pierce its skin. In a second attempt a month later, a harpooner speared an animal, and men on shore hauled it in while others repeatedly stabbed it with bayonets. It was dragged into shallow waters, and the crew waited until the tide receded and it was beached to butcher it. After this, they were hunted with relative ease, the challenge being in hauling the animal back to shore. This bounty inspired maritime fur traders to detour to the Commander Islands and restock their food supplies during North Pacific expeditions.

==== Impact of extinction ====
While not a keystone species, Steller's sea cows likely influenced the community composition of the kelp forests they inhabited, and also boosted their productivity and resilience to environmental stressors by allowing more light into kelp forests and more kelp to grow, and enhancing the recruitment and dispersal of kelp through their feeding behavior. In the modern day, the flow of nutrients from kelp forests to adjacent ecosystems is regulated by the seasons, with seasonal storms and currents being the primary factor. The Steller's sea cow may have allowed this flow to continue year-round, thus allowing for more productivity in adjacent habitats. The disturbance caused by the Steller's sea cow may have facilitated the dispersal of kelp, most notably Nereocystis species, to other habitats, allowing recruitment and colonization of new areas, and facilitating genetic exchange. Their presence may have also allowed sea otters and large marine invertebrates to coexist, indicating a commonly-documented decline in marine invertebrate populations driven by sea otters (an example being in populations of the black leather chiton) may be due to lost ecosystem functions associated with the Steller's sea cow. This indicates that due to the sea cow's extinction, the ecosystem dynamics and resilience of North Pacific kelp forests may have already been compromised well before more well-known modern stressors like overharvesting and climate change.

=== Later reported sightings ===
Sea cow sightings have been reported after Brandt's official 1768 date of extinction. Lucien Turner, an American ethnologist and naturalist, said the natives of Attu Island reported that the sea cows survived into the 1800s, and were sometimes hunted.

In 1963, the official journal of the Academy of Sciences of the USSR published an article announcing a possible sighting. The previous year, the whaling ship Buran had reported a group of large marine mammals grazing on seaweed in shallow water off Kamchatka, in the Gulf of Anadyr. The crew reported seeing six of these animals ranging from 6 to 8 meters (20 to 26 ft), with trunks and split lips. There have also been alleged sightings by local fishermen in the northern Kuril Islands, and around the Kamchatka and Chukchi peninsulas.

In 1976, the editorial office of the magazine "Vokrug Sveta" received a letter from the Kamchatkan meteorologist Y. V. Koev stating that he had seen a Sea Cow near Cape Lopatka. "I can say that in August 1976 in the area of Cape Lopatka I saw a Steller's cow. What allows me to make such a statement? I have seen whales, killer whales, seals, sea lions, seals, sea otters and walruses repeatedly. This animal does not resemble any of the above. The length is about five meters. It swam very slowly in shallow water. As if it rolled like a wave. First, a head with a characteristic growth appeared, then a massive body and then a tail. Yes, yes, which attracted my attention (by the way, there is a witness). Because when a seal or a walrus swims like this, their hind legs are pressed against each other, and you can see that they are flippers, and this one had a tail like a whale's. Such an impression,... that every time she surfaced with her stomach up, slowly rolling her body. And I put the tail like a whale 'butterfly' when the whale goes into the depths...".

=== Uses ===
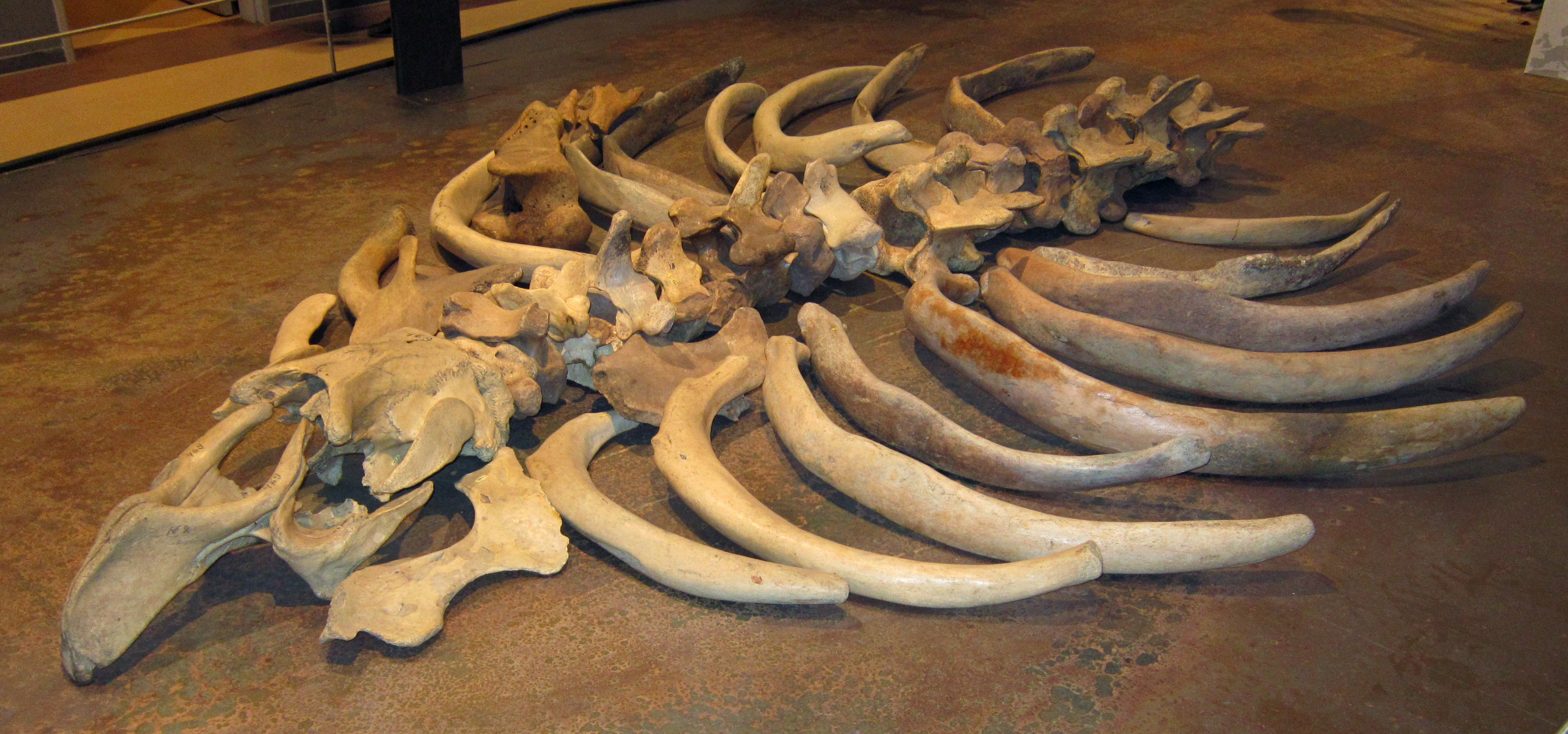
Skeleton excavated on Bering Island in 1948, Zoologisk Museum

Steller's sea cow was described as being "tasty" by Steller; the meat was said to have a taste similar to corned beef, though it was tougher, redder, and needed to be cooked longer. The meat was abundant on the animal, and slow to spoil, perhaps due to the high amount of salt in the animal's diet effectively curing it. The fat could be used for cooking and as an odorless lamp oil. The crew of the St. Peter drank the fat in cups and Steller described it as having a taste like almond oil. The thick, sweet milk of female sea cows could be drunk or made into butter, and the thick, leathery hide could be used to make clothing, such as shoes and belts, and large skin boats sometimes called baidarkas or umiaks.

Towards the end of the 19th century, bones and fossils from the extinct animal were valuable and often sold to museums at high prices. Most were collected during this time, limiting trade after 1900. Some are still sold commercially, as the highly dense cortical bone is well-suited for making items such as knife handles and decorative carvings. Because the sea cow is extinct, native artisan products made in Alaska from this "mermaid ivory" are legal to sell in the United States and do not fall under the jurisdiction of the Marine Mammal Protection Act (MMPA) or the Convention on International Trade in Endangered Species of Wild Fauna and Flora (CITES), which restrict the trade of marine mammal products. Although the distribution is legal, the sale of unfossilized bones is generally prohibited and trade in products made of the bones is regulated because some of the material is unlikely to be authentic and probably comes from arctic cetaceans.

The ethnographer Elizabeth Porfirevna Orlova, from the Russian Museum of Ethnography, was working on the Commander Island Aleuts from August to September 1961. Her research includes notes about a game of accuracy, called kakan ("stones") played with the bones of the Steller's sea cow. Kakan was usually played at home between adults during bad weather, at least during Orlova's fieldwork.

=== In literature, media, and folklore ===
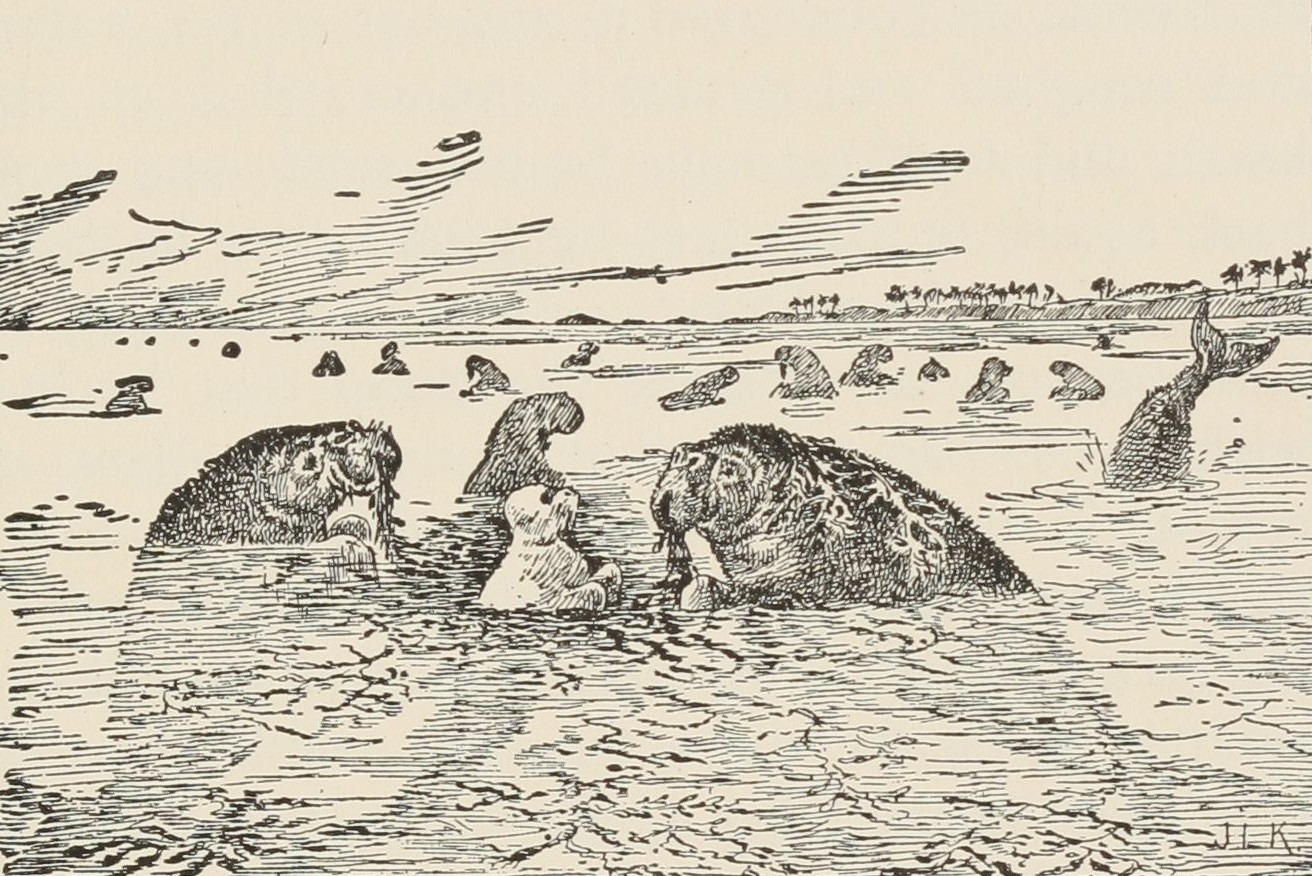
Kotick the white seal talking to sea cows in Rudyard Kipling's The Jungle Book (1895)

In the story The White Seal from The Jungle Book by Rudyard Kipling, which takes place in the Bering Sea, Kotick the rare white seal consults Sea Cow during his journey to find a new home.

Tales of a Sea Cow is a 2012 docufiction film by Icelandic-French artist Etienne de France about a fictional 2006 discovery of Steller's sea cows off the coast of Greenland. The film has been exhibited in art museums and universities in Europe.

Steller's sea cows appear in two books of poetry: Nach der Natur (1995) by Winfried Georg Sebald, and Species Evanescens (2009) by Russian poet Andrei Bronnikov. Bronnikov's book depicts the events of the Great Northern Expedition through the eyes of Steller; Sebald's book looks at the conflict between man and nature, including the extinction of Steller's sea cow.

The 2023 novel Beasts of the Sea (Elolliset) by Finnish author and literary scholar Iida Turpeinen uses Steller's sea cow and its demise as a central theme. It features multiple characters at different times in history that were involved with the animal, beginning from Steller's expedition and telling how the complete skeleton was conserved and ended up in the Helsinki Museum of Natural History.

Scottish poet John Glenday published the poem "The Kelp Eaters" in his 2003 volume, Grain, describing the beauty and loving nature of the sea cows and their harpooning by the narrator and his companions. The poem carries the epigraph "From "Journal of a Voyage with Bering 1741-1742" By Georg Wilhelm Steller".

=== Genetic research and potential revival ===
In 2021, the nuclear genome of the species was sequenced from skeletal remains. The reconstructed genome showed that the species was already declining due to low genetic diversity caused by climate change and hunting by Paleolithic humans prior to its discovery by Steller, similar to the final populations of woolly mammoths on Wrangel Island. A year later, in late 2022, a group of Russian scientists funded by Sergi Bachin began research to potentially revive the species and reintroduce it to the Bering Sea. Arctic Sirenia plans to revive the species through genome editing of the dugong, but an artificial womb is necessary to conceive a living sea cow due to the lack of an appropriate living surrogate species. Ben Lamm of Colossal Biosciences has also stated that he and his company want to revive the species after they complete their first four projects (woolly mammoth, dodo, thylacine, and northern white rhinoceros) and have an artificial animal womb developed.

== See also ==
- Holocene extinction
- List of extinct animals of North America
- List of Asian animals extinct in the Holocene
- List of recently extinct mammals
- Evolution of sirenians
- Cuesta sea cow
- Takikawa sea cow
