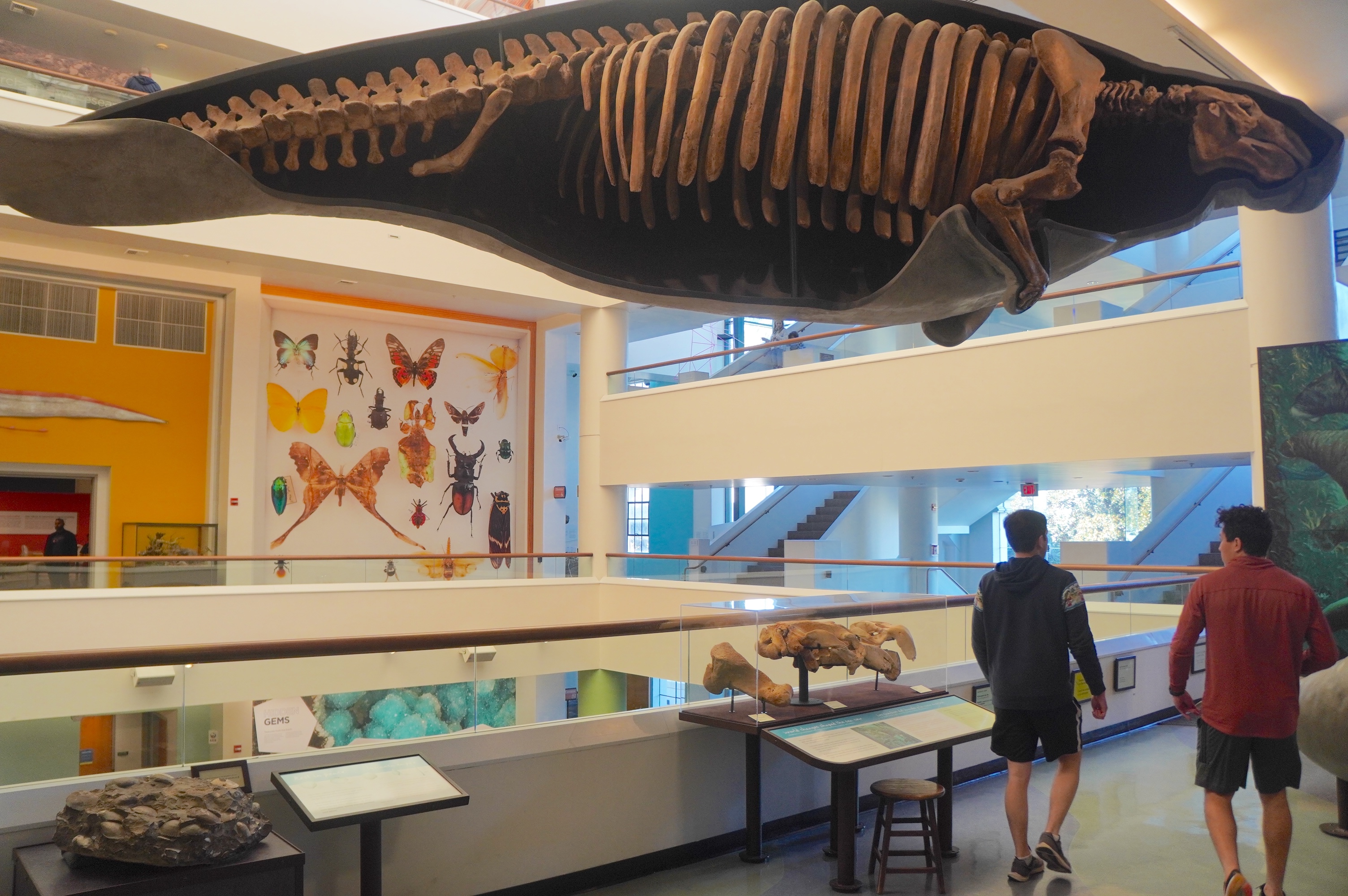
- Reconstructed skeleton at San Diego Natural History Museum

Scientific classification
- Kingdom: Animalia
- Phylum: Chordata
- Class: Mammalia
- Order: Sirenia
- Family: Dugongidae
- Genus: †Hydrodamalis
- Species: †H. cuestae

Binomial name
- †Hydrodamalis cuestae Domning, 1978

Synonyms
- ?†H. spissa Furusawa, 1988

= Cuesta sea cow =

Cuesta sea cow Temporal range: Late Pliocene to early Quaternary 3.6–2.6 Ma

Species of mammal

The Cuesta sea cow (Hydrodamalis cuestae) is an extinct herbivorous marine mammal and is the direct ancestor of the Steller's sea cow (Hydrodamalis gigas). They reached up to 9 metres (30 ft) in length, making them among the biggest sirenians to have ever lived. They were first described in 1978 by Daryl Domning when fossils in California were unearthed. Its appearance and behavior are largely based on that of the well-documented Steller's sea cow, which, unlike the Cuesta sea cow, lived into the modern era and was well-described.

== Taxonomy and extinction ==
Relations within Hydrodamalinae

- Sirenia
  - †Dusisiren reinharti
  - - †Dusisiren jordani
    - - †Dusisiren dewana
      - - †Dusisiren takasatensis
        - - †Hydrodamalis cuestae
          - - †Hydrodamalis spissa
            - - †Hydrodamalis gigas

Based on a 2004 study by Hitoshi Furusawa

The fossils of the Cuesta sea cow were first discovered in the Late Pliocene sediment formations of Pismo Beach, California in 1978, and successive finds of the species were unearthed elsewhere in California. In 1988, fossils of sea cows were discovered in Hokkaido that were originally assigned to the Takikawa sea cow (H. spissa), a newly-described species, but this is thought of by some scientists as a synonym of H. cuestae. It is uncertain whether or not H. spissa was simply a local variant of H. cuestae or a completely separate lineage. The Steller's sea cow was apparently a direct descendant of the Cuesta sea cow. H. spissa and H. gigas have demonstrated to be related but different by the cerebrum shape, and optic nerve positions. The optic nerve separates from the trigeminal nerve. These differences were able to depict differences between the Hydrodamalinae that inhibited different areas of the Pacific Ocean. The H. spissa inhibiting the western Pacific and the H. cuestae, inhibiting the eastern Pacific.

The Cuesta sea cow went extinct around 2½ million years ago. Its disappearance was likely linked to the onset of the Quaternary glaciation; the availability of the sea cows’ main food source, seagrasses, likely decreased due to the cooling of the oceans, disappearing to the point where the sea cow’s entire species simply could not sustain itself. In addition, the Cuesta sea cow was not adapted to colder waters; those animals that did survive probably became the ancient ancestors of the Steller's sea cow.

== Biology and behavior ==
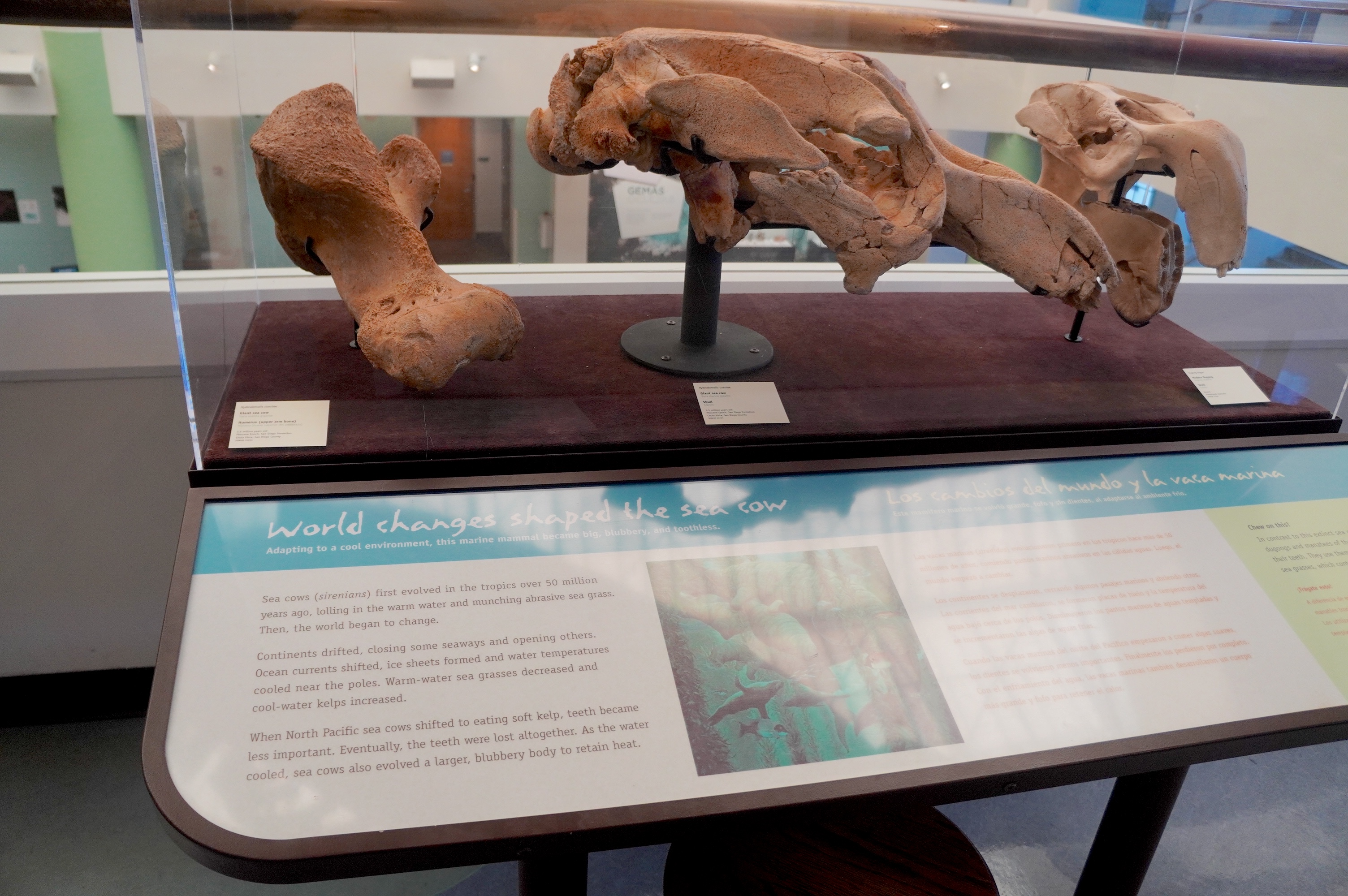
Skull and limb-bone

The Cuesta sea cow, like the Steller's sea cow, or even modern manatees, was probably gregarious and lived in small family groups for relative safety. Their bones were dense, and served as a sort of “ballast” to prevent their large bodies from floating, a likely adaptation due to their constant grazing of seagrasses on the shallow ocean floor. Seagrasses and other marine plants were likely their preferred foods. Cuesta sea cows are thought to have 'walked' along the shallow coastal seafloor using their front limbs, as well as their powerful tail fin for propulsion. It has been speculated that, like Steller's sea cows and other sirenians, the front limbs were used as a holdfast. The Cuesta sea cow was among the largest of the sirenians to have ever lived, reaching up to 9 metres (30 ft) in length and possibly 10 tonnes (11 short tons). The body was fusiform, tapered at both the head and tail.

== See also ==
- Steller's sea cow
- Takikawa sea cow
- Hydrodamalinae
