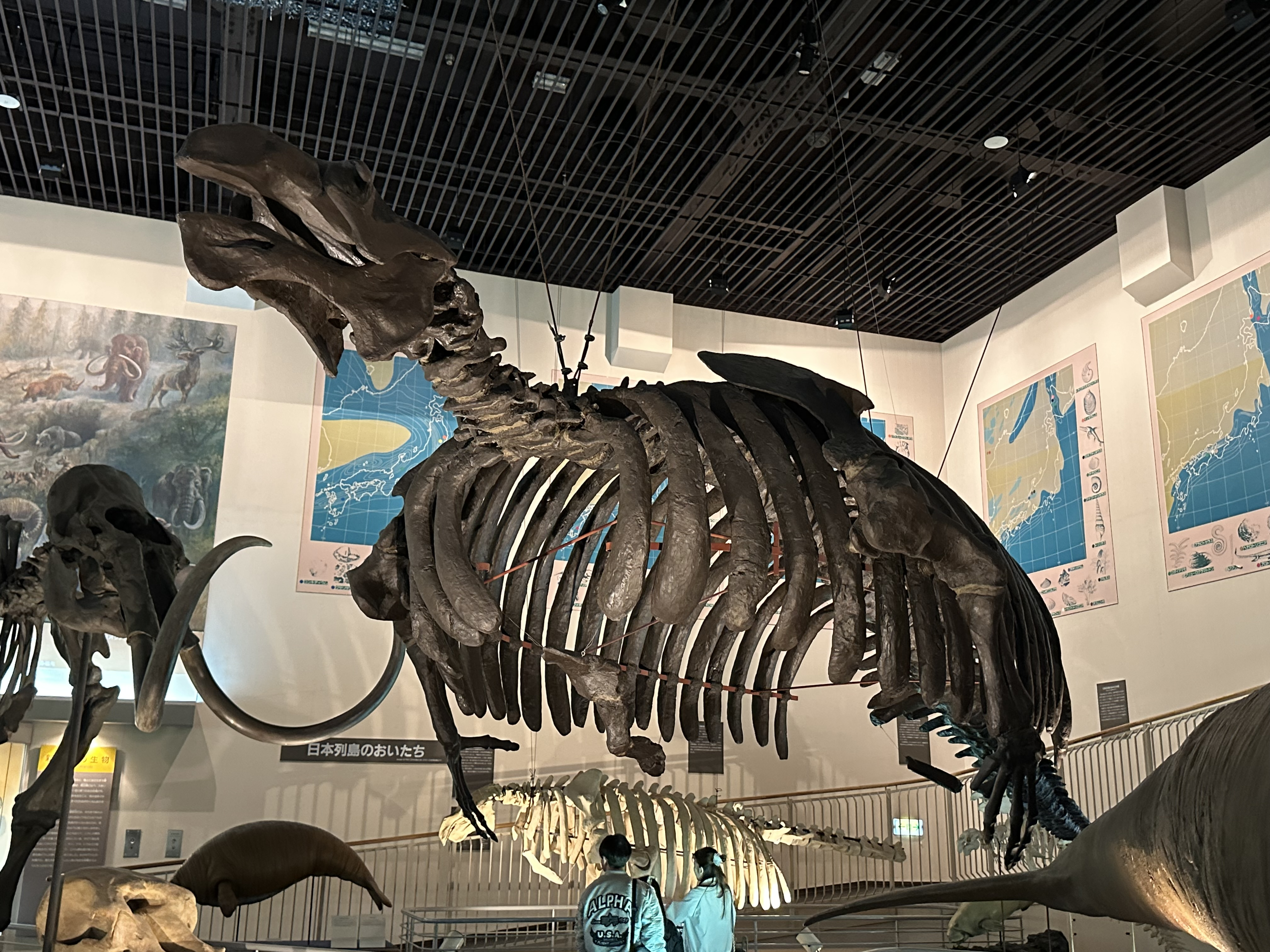
- The skeletal mount in Takikawa Museum of Art and Natural History

Scientific classification
- Kingdom: Animalia
- Phylum: Chordata
- Class: Mammalia
- Order: Sirenia
- Family: Dugongidae
- Genus: †Hydrodamalis
- Species: †H. spissa

Binomial name
- †Hydrodamalis spissa Furusawa, 1988

Synonyms
- ?†H. cuestae Domning, 1978

= Takikawa sea cow =

Takikawa sea cow Temporal range: Late Pliocene 3.6–2.6 Ma

Extinct herbivorous marine mammal

The Takikawa sea cow (Hydrodamalis spissa) is an extinct herbivorous marine mammal of the Late Pliocene which was closely related to the recently extinct Steller's sea cow (H. gigas). In 1988, fossils of sea cows were discovered in Hokkaido and were originally assigned to the Takikawa sea cow, a newly described species, even though this taxon is thought of by some scientists as a synonym of the Cuesta sea cow (H. cuestae). It is uncertain whether or not the Takikawa sea cow was simply a local variant of the Cuesta sea cow or a completely separate lineage. However, the Steller's sea cow and Takikawa sea cow share more morphological similarities than the Takikawa sea cow and Cuesta sea cow.

Relations within Hydrodamalinae

- Sirenia
  - †Dusisiren reinharti
  - - †Dusisiren jordani
    - - †Dusisiren dewana
      - - †Dusisiren takasatensis
        - - †Hydrodamalis cuestae
          - - †Hydrodamalis spissa
            - - †Hydrodamalis gigas

Based on a 2004 study by Hitoshi Furusawa
