= Étienne de France =

Étienne de France (1984) is a French visual artist and filmmaker. He is best known for multiple art projects mixing documentary and fiction, most notably the 2012 docufiction film Tales of Sea Cow, about a fictional rediscovery of the extinct Steller's sea cow, a sirenian from the Bering Sea; and his "Icelandtrain" Project, concerning a hypothetical modern passenger rail network in Iceland (a nation which has never possessed any passenger railroad).

== Biography ==
Etienne de France was born in France in 1984. He completed his bachelor's degree in Art History at the University of Paris / Panthéon Sorbonne, in Paris, France, in 2008. He then moved to Iceland and completed his B.A. in Visual Arts at the Iceland Academy of Arts, in Reykjavík, Iceland, in 2008.

== Tales of a Sea Cow ==
Etienne de France wrote and produced his 59-minute pseudo-documentary film Tales of a Sea Cow in 2012. This film portrays a fictional 2006 re-discovery by marine biologists of a living population of the Steller's sea cow, an extinct sirenian species, off the coast of Greenland in the Arctic Ocean and Atlantic Ocean via analysis of sound recordings of their calls. The Steller's Sea Cow is known historically only from several islands in the Bering Sea, and prehistorically as a fossil at various sites on both the North American and Asian sides of the Pacific Ocean; no known Steller's Sea Cow has ever lived in the North Atlantic Ocean (although species of the related manatee do live in southern portions).

This film was inspired by real scientific studies and techniques such as the article entitled Information Entropy of Humpback Whales Songs, published by scientists Ryuji Suzuki, John R. Buck and Peter Tyack in 2005. One of these authors, the scientist John R. Buck (of the University of Massachusetts Dartmouth) is the scientific advisor for this film.

This film has been exhibited in public institutions such as art museums and universities in countries in Europe, including Italy, Iceland, and France, and has been screened in Canada

The cast of this film is largely Icelandic, and includes as lead actors Friðgeir Einarsson and Aðalbjörg Þóra Árnadóttir.

French Art critic Annick Buread found this film to be a " tongue in cheek and joyous but unsettling fable".

Tales of a Sea Cow was a finalist for the 2013 Lichter Art Award, an international video art award in Frankfurt.

This film was also nominated for the 2013 "Limited Budget Award" category of the Wildtalk Africa 2013 Roscar Awards, a biennial South African wildlife film award.

== Icelandtrain and Icelandtraincity projects ==
Etienne de France produced and organized an "advertising project" for a hypothetical passenger railroad service in Iceland called the "Icelandtrain". Iceland is a nation with no past or present passenger railroad service of any kind, although several industrial or harbor railroads once existed in Iceland. This art project included an Icelandtrain "website", "tickets", a logo, and a fashion show exhibiting hypothetical uniforms for various Icelandtrain "staff" (including stationmasters, train operators, and the like).

The Icelandtraincity project is a related urban planning/architecture project advocating the planning of modular cities in Iceland supported by a railroad network in order to reduce dependence on fossil fuel energy. Etienne de France produced a sculpture depicting such a city.

Katharina Hauptmann of The Iceland Review cited this work as a " wonderful and interesting art project" that shows that a railroad system is in the minds of many Icelandic people and advocates for such a rail system.

== Other works ==
- Rise is a sculptural exhibit of 17 sculptures that occupied the island of Domaine de Chamarande. It consists of tree huts and other objects that the artist claims have Mesoamerican influence.
- Exploration of a Failure is a short film (24 minutes) concerning nature and a 200 km walk performed by the artist near his house in Burgundy, France.
