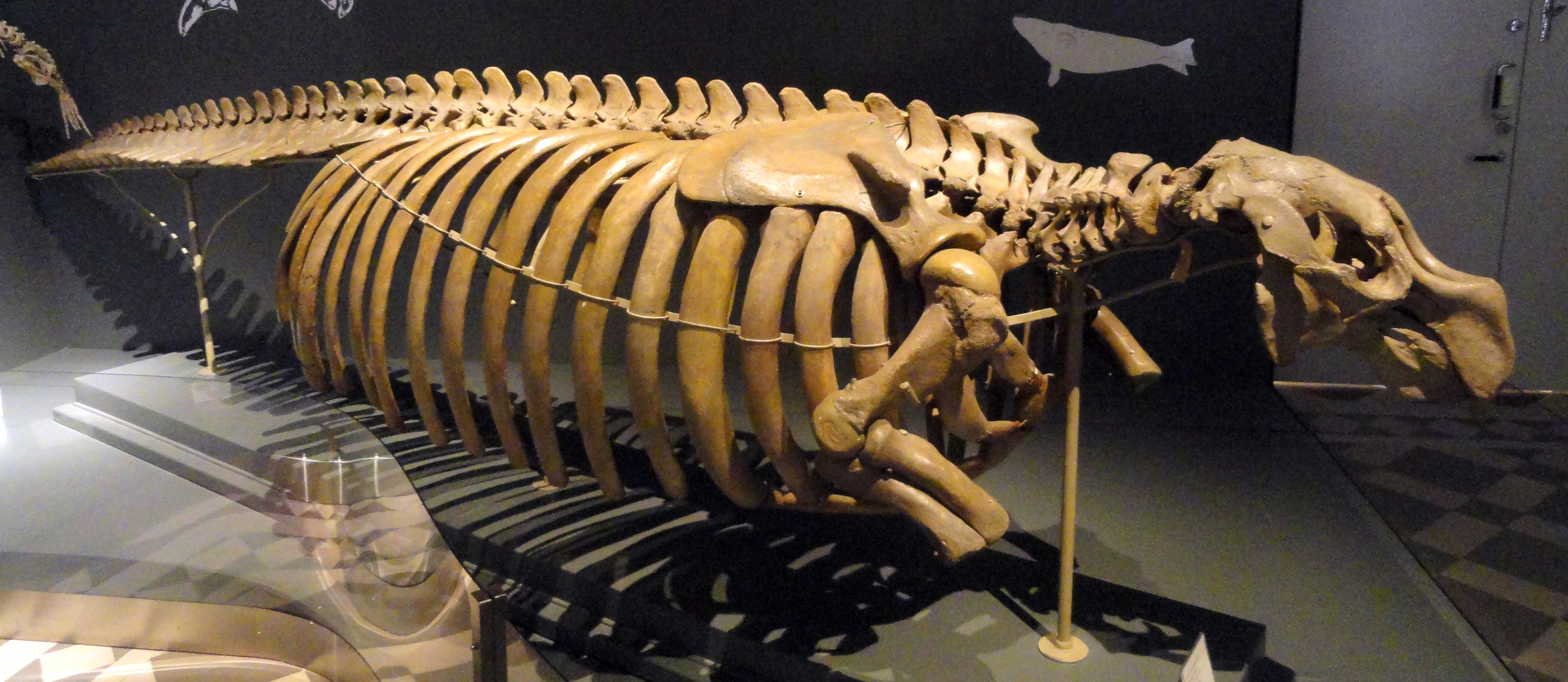
- Skeleton of Steller's sea cow (Hydrodamalis gigas) at the Finnish Museum of Natural History

Scientific classification
- Kingdom: Animalia
- Phylum: Chordata
- Class: Mammalia
- Infraclass: Placentalia
- Order: Sirenia
- Family: Dugongidae
- Subfamily: †Hydrodamalinae
- Genus: †Hydrodamalis; Retzius, 1794

Type species
- †Hydrodamalis stelleri Retzius, 1794

Species
- †Hydrodamalis gigas (Zimmermann, 1780) †Hydrodamalis cuestae Domning, 1978 †?Hydrodamalis spissa Furusawa, 1988

Synonyms
- List: †Dystomus von Waldheim, 1813; †Haligyna Billberg, 1827; †Manati Steller, 1774; †Nepus von Waldheim, 1814; †Rhytina Berthold, 1827; †Rhytine Burmeister, 1837; †Rytina Illiger, 1811; †Sirene Link, 1794; †Stellerus Desmarest, 1822

= Hydrodamalis =

Hydrodamalis Temporal range: late Pliocene – Holocene,

Extinct family of mammals

Hydrodamalis is a genus of extinct herbivorous sirenian marine mammals. It included the Steller's sea cow (Hydrodamalis gigas), the Cuesta sea cow (Hydrodamalis cuestae), and the Takikawa sea cow (Hydrodamalis spissa). The fossil genus Dusisiren is regarded as the sister taxon of Hydrodamalis: together, the two genera form the dugong subfamily Hydrodamalinae. They were the largest member of the order Sirenia, whose only extant members are the dugong (Dugong dugon) and the manatees (Trichechus spp.). They reached up to 9 metres (30 ft) in length, making the Steller's sea cow among the largest mammals other than whales to have existed in the Holocene epoch. Steller's sea cow was first described by Georg Wilhelm Steller, Cuesta by Daryl Domning, and Takikawa by Hitoshi Furusawa. The Steller's sea cow was the only member of the genus to survive into modern times, and, although had formerly been abundant throughout the North Pacific, by the mid 1700s, its range had been limited to a single, isolated population surrounding the uninhabited Commander Islands. It was hunted for its meat, skin, and fat by fur traders, and was also hunted by aboriginals of the North Pacific coast, leading to its and the genus' extinction 27 years after discovery. The Cuesta sea cow along with the Takikawa sea cow were probably extinct at the end of the Pliocene due to the onset of the Ice Ages and the subsequent recession of seagrasses—their main food source.

- Sirenia
  - - ......Dugongidae
      - - †Halitherium
          - †H. schinzii
          - †H. alleni
        - - - †Dusisiren
              - †D. jordani
              - †D. reinharti
              - †D. dewana
              - †D. takasatensis
          - - †Hydrodamalis
              - †H. gigas
              - - †H. cuestae
                - †H. spissa
      - - Dugong
          - Dugong dugon
  - - - Trichechidae
        - .....Trichechus
          - Trichechus inunguis
          - Trichechus manatus
          - Trichechus senegalensis

Cladogram on the relations of the hydrodamalines based on a 2004 study by Hitoshi Furuwasha
