= Ceratodontes =

Teeth-like structures

Ceratodontes or cornudentes are structures consisting of keratin, located in the mouth cavity, which functionally serve as teeth. They develop, unlike osseous teeth, through cornification of the epithelium of the oral mucosa.

== Forms ==
Ceratodontes occur in three forms: conical, plate-shaped and rhamphotheca.

Conical ceratodontes which occur in Cyclostomata, who lack real teeth or any other form of calcium-based skeleton growth. They are distributed numerously throughout their mouths (which serve to suction) in different sizes and arrangements. Each tooth forms a pointed and hard conical papilla whose base is occupied by vascular pulpa and sits on the oral mucosa. Their innermost layer consists of conical cells, which at their most young inner-end cut off an enamel-like cuticula.

Plate-shaped ceratodontes occur among some mammals, who lost their osseous teeth through the process of evolution, but whose developmental leftovers can still be observed in their jaws during their embryonic state. Platypodes – who lose their osseous teeth upon leaving the breeding burrow – have two such plates located on the chewing surface of each half of their jaw; meaning they possess four such plates in total. The now extinct steller's sea cow had just one such plate on each half of its jaw, which it used for chewing. Baleen whales develop a pair of large, transverse, triangular keratinous plates at their maxilla and palate, which developed out of the cornified epithelium of the palatine raphe. They are referred to as baleen plates in general and scientific usage.

Rhamphotheca of the jaw edge or keratinised beaks, develop as hard and cutting keratin coatings over the osseous jaw edges. They too represent a secondary cornification of the exodermal oral epithelium. They are present among some reptiles for example anomodonts, turtles and in birds. The older ancestors of these groups all possessed osseous teeth.
