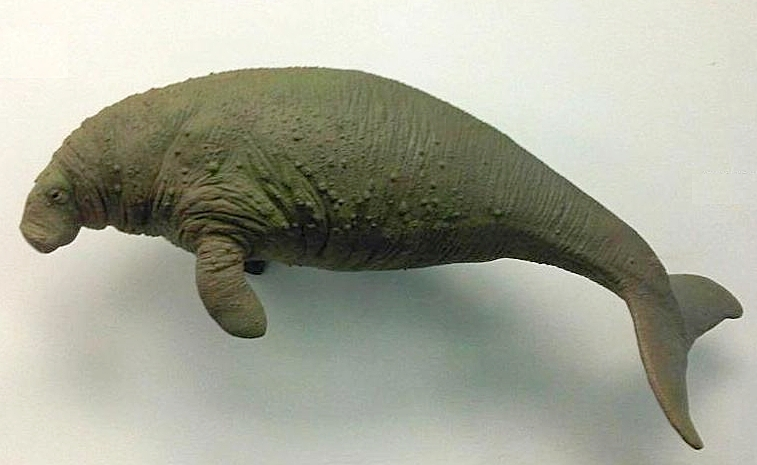
- Model of steller's sea cow

Scientific classification
- Kingdom: Animalia
- Phylum: Chordata
- Class: Mammalia
- Order: Sirenia
- Family: Dugongidae
- Subfamily: †Hydrodamalinae; Palmer 1895

Genera
- †Dusisiren Domning 1978; †Hydrodamalis Retzius 1794

Synonyms
- Hydrodamalidae

= Hydrodamalinae =

Hydrodamalinae Temporal range: 15.97–0.000258 Ma Middle Miocene to Holocene

Extinct subfamily of mammals

Hydrodamalinae is a recently extinct subfamily of the sirenian family Dugongidae. The Steller's sea cow (Hydrodamalis gigas) was hunted to extinction by 1768, while the genus Dusisiren is known from fossils dating from the middle Miocene to early Pliocene.
