= List of Arctic cetaceans =

This is a list of Arctic cetaceans.

== Cetacea ==
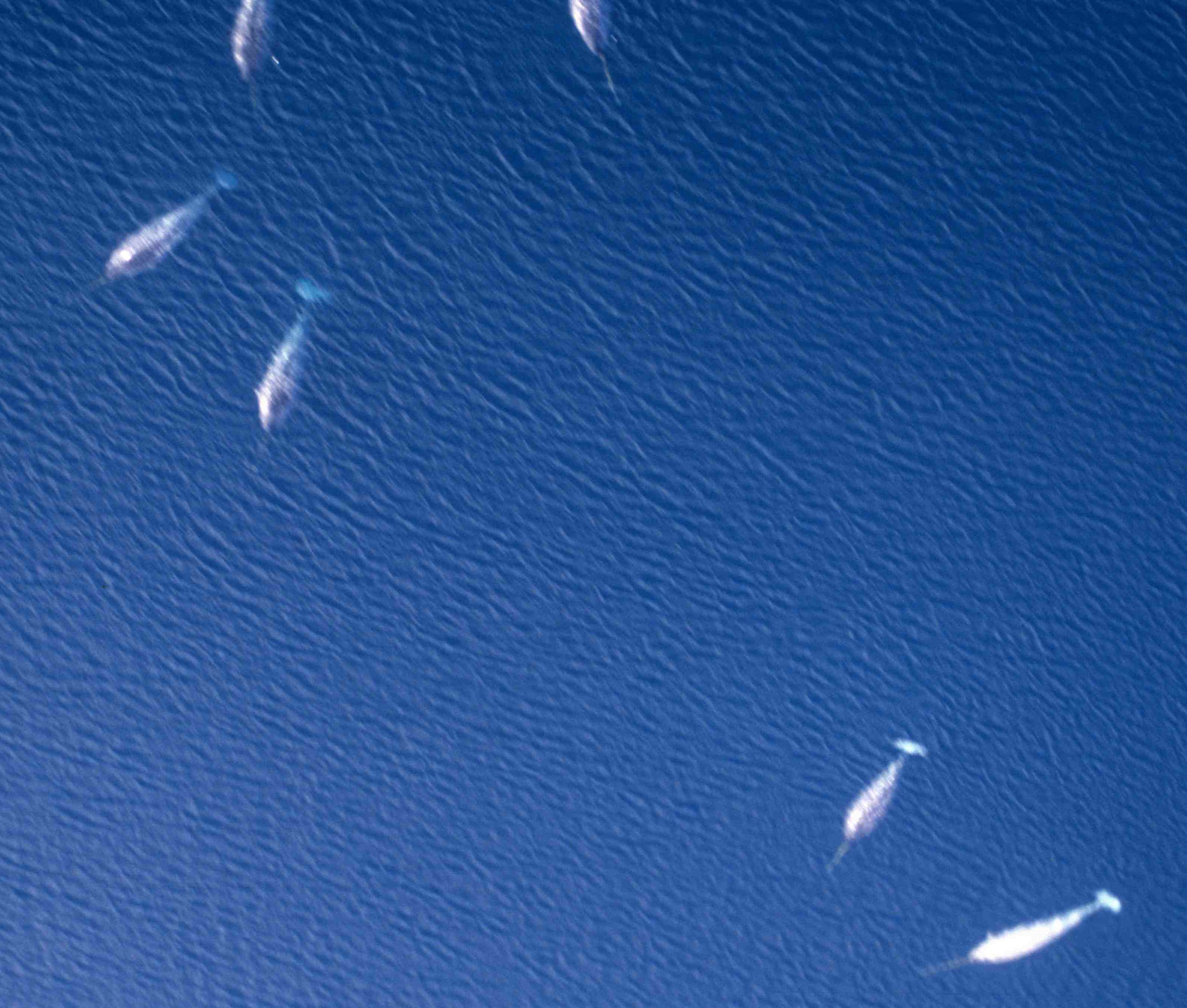
Narwhals

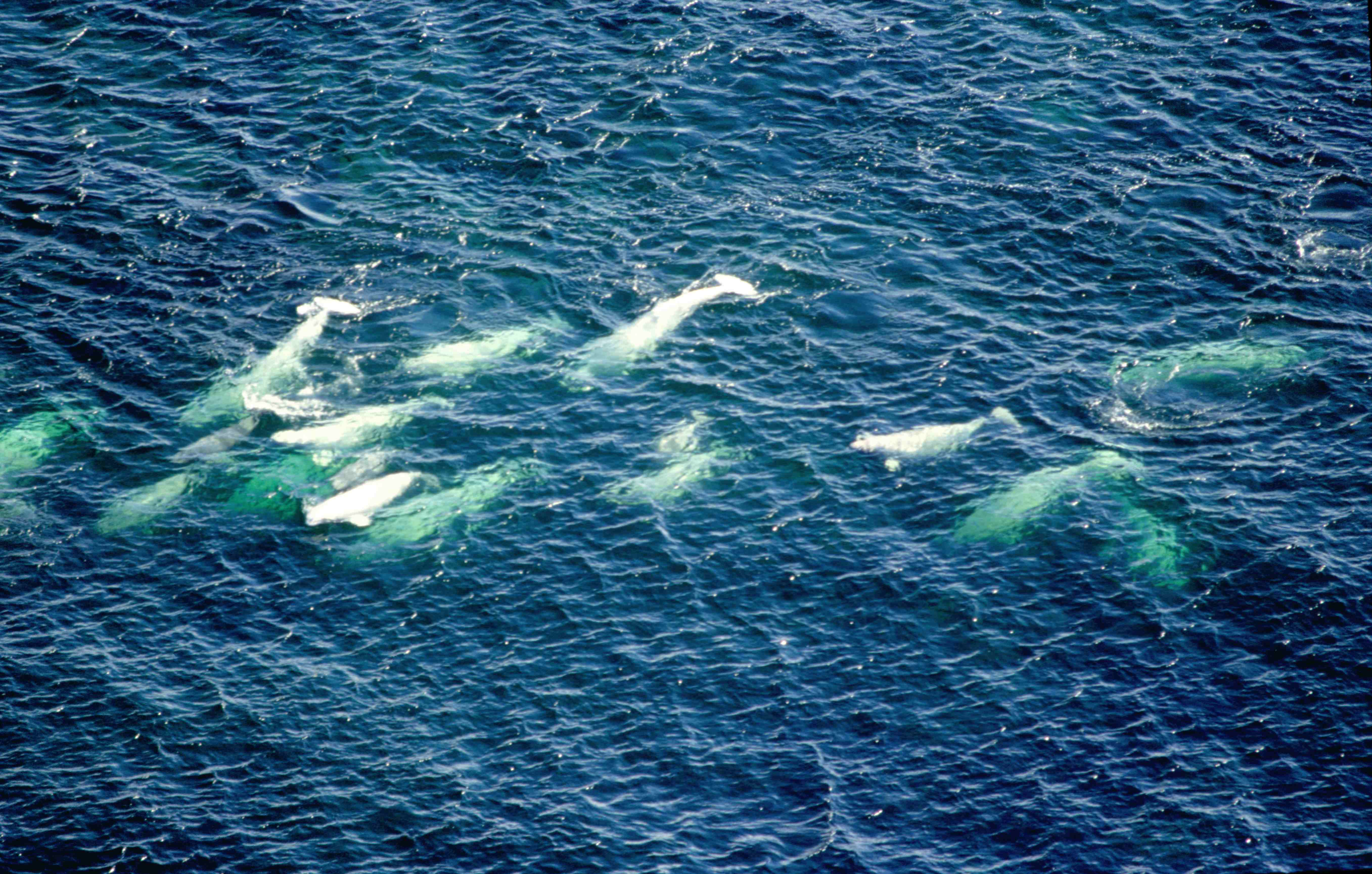
Beluga whales

- Balaenidae
  - Bowhead whale (ᐊᕐᕕᖅ, arviq) Balaena mysticetus
- Balaenopteridae
  - Fin whale Balaenoptera physalus
  - Sei whale Balaenoptera borealis
  - Blue whale (ᐊᕐᕕᖅ ᓂᐊᖁᕐᓗᖕᓂᖅᓴᖅ, ᐃᐸᒃ, arviq niaqurlungniqsaq, ipak) Balaenoptera musculus
  - Common minke whale Balaenoptera acutorostrata
  - Humpback whale Megaptera novaeangliae
- Delphinidae
  - Killer whale (ᐋᕐᓗ, ᐊᕐᓗᒃ, ᐋᕐᓗᒃ, aarlu, arluk, aarluk) Orcinus orca
  - Long-finned pilot whale
  - Atlantic white-sided dolphin (aarluarsuk)
  - White-beaked dolphin
- Monodontidae
  - Narwhal (ᑑᒑᓕᒃ, tuugaalik, ᕿᓚᓗᒐᖅ ᑑᒑᓕᒃ, qilalugaq tuugaalik) Monodon monoceros
  - Beluga whale (ᕿᓇᓗᒐᖅ, qilalugaq; Бөлүүгэ) Delphinapterus leucas
    - Cumberland Sound beluga
- Mysticeti
  - Gray whale
- Phocoenidae
  - Harbour porpoise Phocoena phocoena (niisa)
- Physeteridae
  - Sperm whale (ᑭᒍᑎᓕᒃ, kigutilik) Physeter macrocephalus
- Ziphiidae
  - Northern bottlenose whale Hyperoodon ampullatus
