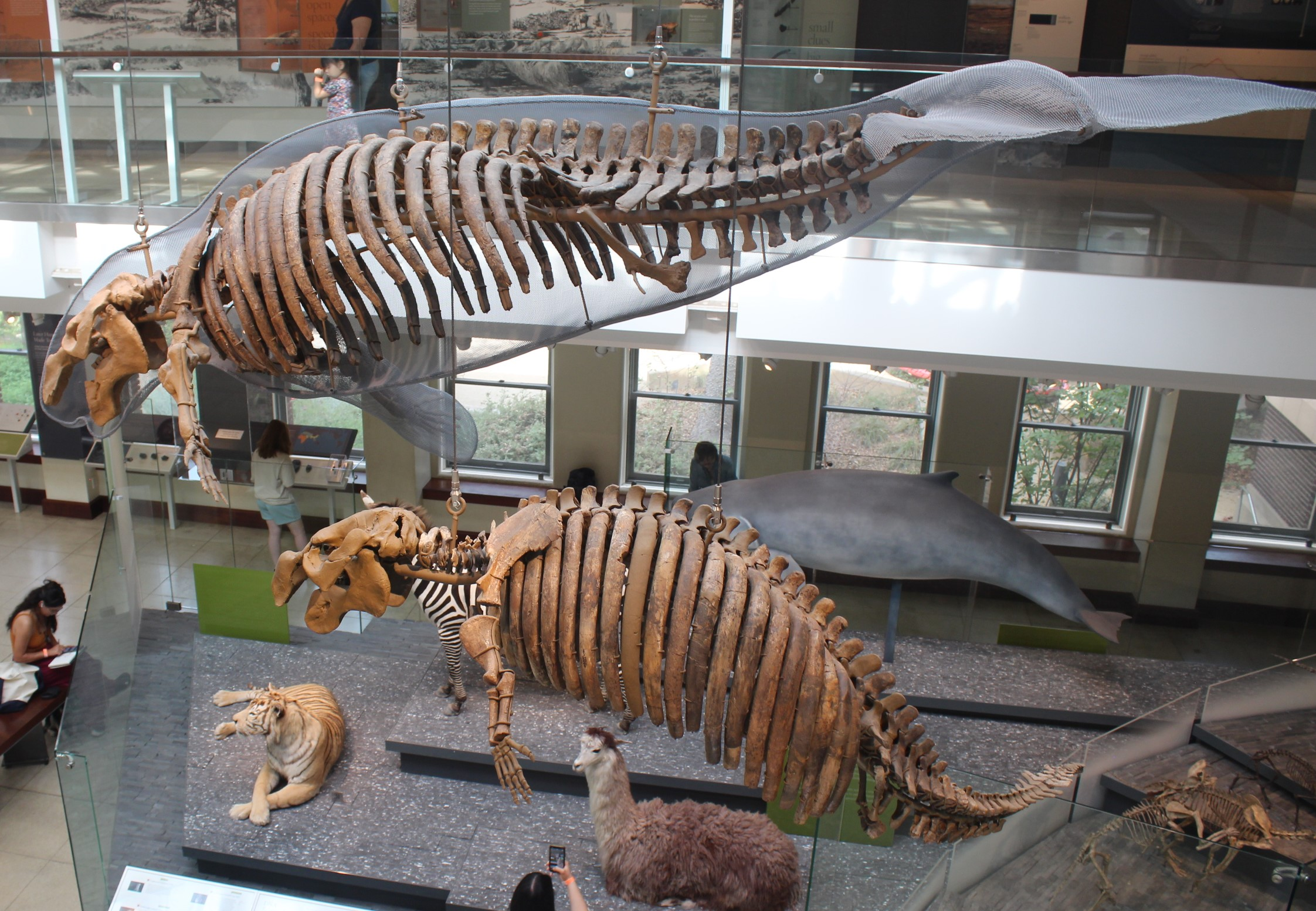
- Skeletons of adult and juvenile D. jordani at the Natural History Museum of Los Angeles County
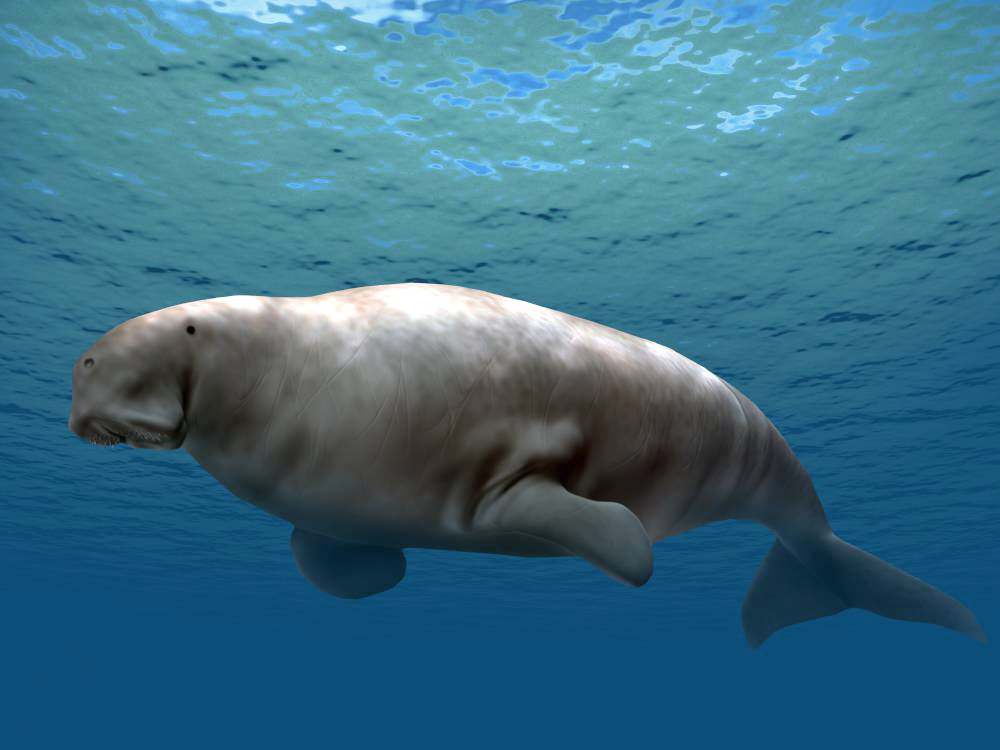
- Life restoration of D. jordani

Scientific classification
- Kingdom: Animalia
- Phylum: Chordata
- Class: Mammalia
- Infraclass: Placentalia
- Order: Sirenia
- Family: Dugongidae
- Subfamily: †Hydrodamalinae
- Genus: †Dusisiren

Type species
- Dusisiren jordani Kellogg, 1925

Species
- D. dewana Takahashi, Domning, and Saito, 1986; D. jordani (Kellogg, 1925) (type); D. reinharti Domning, 1978; D. takasatensis Kobayashi, Horikawa, & Miyazaki, 1995

= Dusisiren =

Dusisiren Temporal range: Middle Miocene to Pliocene, 16–5 Ma

Genus of mammals

Dusisiren is an extinct genus of dugong related to the Steller's sea cow that lived in the North Pacific during the Neogene.

== Paleobiology ==
Dusisiren is a sirenian exemplar of the evolutionary theory of punctuated equilibrium. It evolved from a mangrove-eating ancestor to adapt to cold climates in the North Pacific by developing the capability to feed on kelp beds out on the open coast. The incipient modifications to the cervicals suggest that it was capable of maneuvering and feeding in high-energy environments of surf-swept coasts with deep, cold water.

== Species ==
There are four recognized species of Dusisiren:

- Dusisiren jordani (Kellogg, 1925) (type)
- Dusisiren reinharti Domning, 1978
- Dusisiren dewana Takahashi, Domning, and Saito, 1986
- Dusisiren takasatensis Kobayashi, Horikawa, & Miyazaki, 1995

== See also ==
- Evolution of sirenians

=== Related genus ===
- Hydrodamalis
