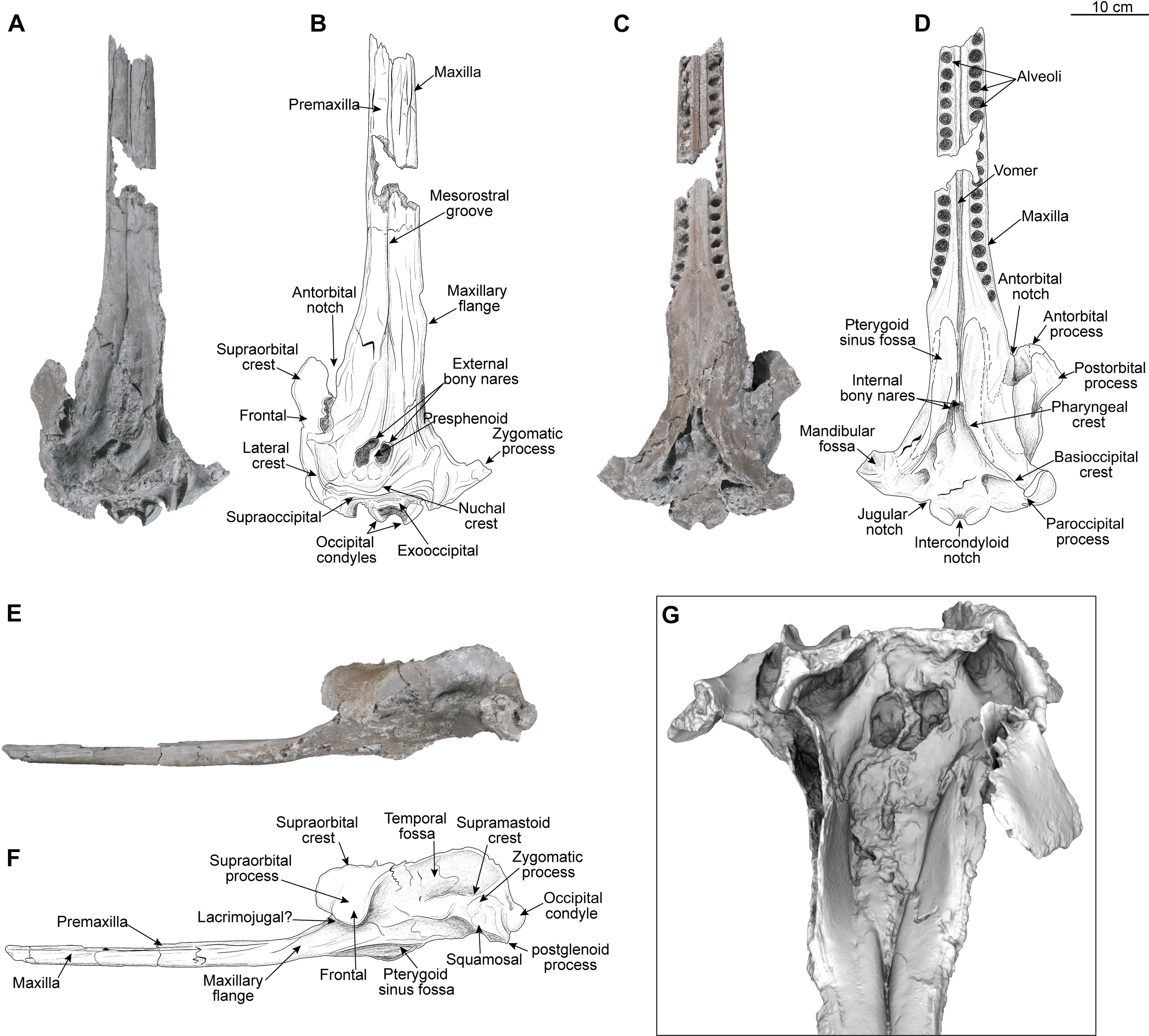
- The holotype skull of Pebanista from multiple angles

Scientific classification
- Kingdom: Animalia
- Phylum: Chordata
- Class: Mammalia
- Order: Artiodactyla
- Infraorder: Cetacea
- Family: Platanistidae
- Genus: †Pebanista; Benites-Palomino et al., 2024
- Species: †P. yacuruna

Binomial name
- †Pebanista yacuruna Benites-Palomino et al., 2024

= Pebanista =

Pebanista Temporal range: Early to Middle Miocene 17–14 Ma

Extinct genus of freshwater dolphins

Pebanista is an extinct genus of platanistid "river dolphin" that lived during the Early to Middle Miocene in Peru. As a member of the Platanistidae, Pebanista is most closely related to the extant Ganges and Indus river dolphins (Platanista) of South Asia and shares no close relation to the modern Amazon river dolphin (Inia geoffrensis) that inhabits the same region today. Like its close relatives, Pebanista possesses enlarged crests that would have covered the melon in life, possibly helping to focus their biosonar while hunting in murky waters. Pebanista further stands out as being the largest "river dolphin" yet discovered, reaching lengths between 2.8–3.47 m (9 ft 2 in – 11 ft 5 in) at minimum, much larger than the biggest recorded freshwater cetaceans of today. Given its relatively robust if elongated snout, it is thought that Pebanista was an active predator, profiting from the rich prey selection available to it in the enormous Pebas wetlands that covered South America during the early parts of the Miocene. Only a single species of Pebanista is known so far: P. yacuruna.

== History and naming ==
Pebanista was described based on MUSM 4017, a nearly complete skull recovered from the early to middle Miocene strata of the Pebas Formation in Peru. More specifically, the fossil was discovered in 2018 in the banks of the Rio Napo in the province of Loreto in sediments that indicate that it dates to the latest Early Miocene. The specimen is currently housed at the Museo de Historia Natural de la Universidad Nacional Mayor de San Marcos. The team that described Pebanista, headed by Aldo Benites-Palomino, also highlight two additional fossils that may be referrable to this genus or a related form. Namely MUSM 3593, a fragment of a snout tentatively referred to as cf. Pebanista, and MUSM 4759, a tympanic bulla only identified as Platanistidae indet. While the latter also stems from the Pebas Formation, the former was discovered in strata of the Ipururo Formation.

The name Pebanista is composed of Pebas, in reference to the name of the formation and ancient wetland system that this animal once inhabited, and the genus name of the modern South Asian river dolphins Platanista. The name was specifically chosen to reflect both the close relationship between Pebanista and Platanista as well as its specific geographic origin, highlighting the great distance between the two taxa. The species name meanwhile derives from the yacuruna, mythical water beings of the Quechua people of the Peruvian Amazon.

== Description ==
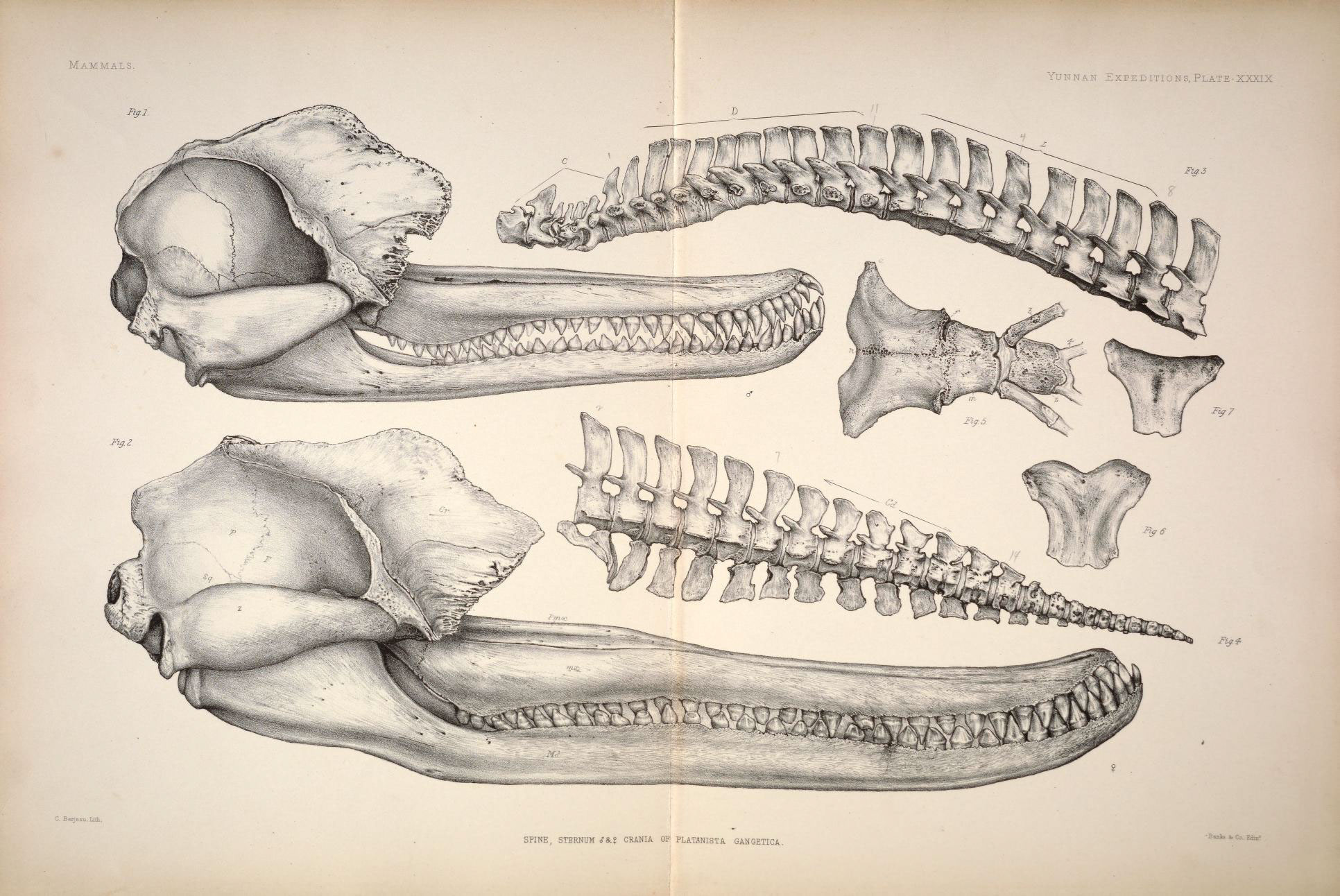
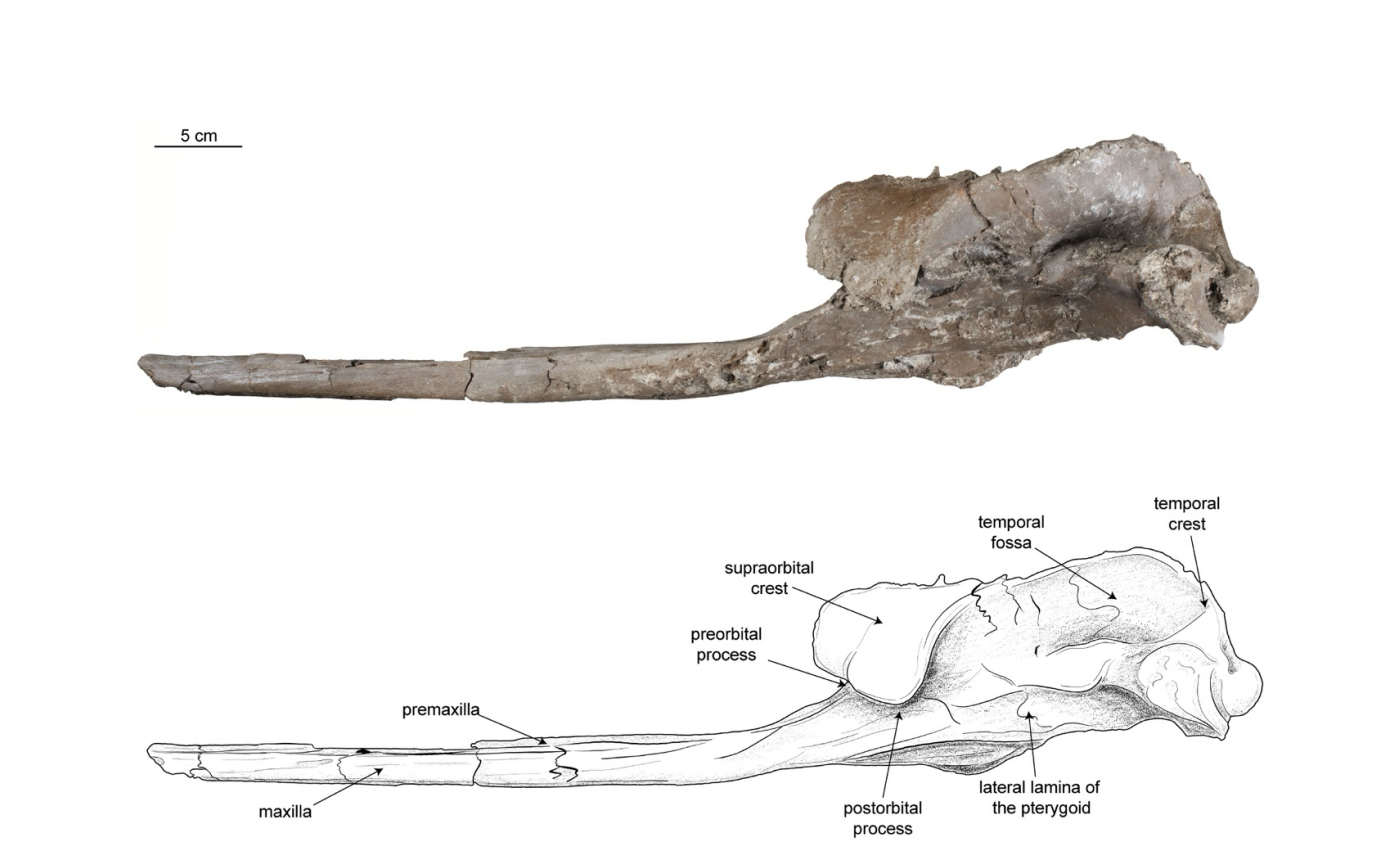
Modern Platanista species (top) have more extensive supraorbital crests than Pebanista (bottom).

The snout or rostrum of Pebanista; formed chiefly by the bones of the premaxillae, maxillae and vomers; is elongated (longirostrine) and flattened top to bottom (dorsoventrally). In this regard the taxon bears close resemblance to other extinct platanistid dolphins like Prepomatodelphis, Pomatodelphis and Zarhachis, whereas the rostrum of extant Platanista has flattened sides (transverse compression). Additionally, the rostrum of Pebanista doesn't simply lack transverse compression, but actually shows a much greater transverse robustness than any other platanistid. Several tooth sockets are preserved in the holotype specimen, indicating that the animal had proportionally larger teeth than its relatives.

Possibly the most distinct trait of the two extant Platanista species are the enlarged supraorbital crests, thin and pneumatic structures that encase large parts of the melon, a key organ used by toothed whales to echolocate. A similar crest can be found in Pebanista, showing the same transverse flattening of the bony plates that sets them apart from more basal forms such as Pomatodelphis and Zarhachis. At the same time, the crests of Pebanista are more robust than what is seen in Platanista, somewhat like an intermediate between it and the marine forms. Another major difference lies in the structural origins of the crests. In Pebanista the supraorbital crests are formed by the frontal bones, while in Platanista it is the maxillae that form these structures. Pomatodelphis and Zarhachis meanwhile show a mix between the two conditions, with both the frontals and the maxillae participating in forming the crests. The dorsomedial margin of the crests, the upper edges that faces inward towards the midline of the skull, show several prominent open spaces referred to as vacuities or cavities. Benites-Palomino and colleagues hypothesize that these cavities may have been an early stage in the development of fully excavated supraorbital crests as seen in today's Platanista species.

The supraorbital crests arch over the medial part of the skull and form the lateral border to the circumnarial basin, with the back of said basin being restricted by the nuchal crest. This gives the back of the skull a more rectangular appearance. The circumnarial basin is a large depression in the upper surface of the skull that surrounds the bony nares, which in Pebanista are shifted towards the left side, contributing to the asymmetry among the facial bones. This is regarded a notable feature that helps identify Pebanista as a platanistid. This asymmetry is not simply limited to the nares either. The highest point of the skull, the vertex is shifted towards the left as well, as are the premaxillae and several facial bones. Only a single orbit is preserved in the holotype, however, based on this it appears to have been proportionally shorter, which is only shared by species of Platanista and not seen in other members of the family. The ventral surface of the skull prominently displays the pterygoid bones, which obscure the vast majority of the palatines sans narrow regions exposed towards the side of the skull. The temporal fossae, which stretch across the lateral surface of the skull on either side, are noted to be longer than they are high and extend so far back that they enter the occipital region. Vice versa, the occipital shield might project slightly forward into the anterior parts of the skull, however, it is likewise possible that this condition was simply caused by the skull being distorted during preservation.

=== Size ===
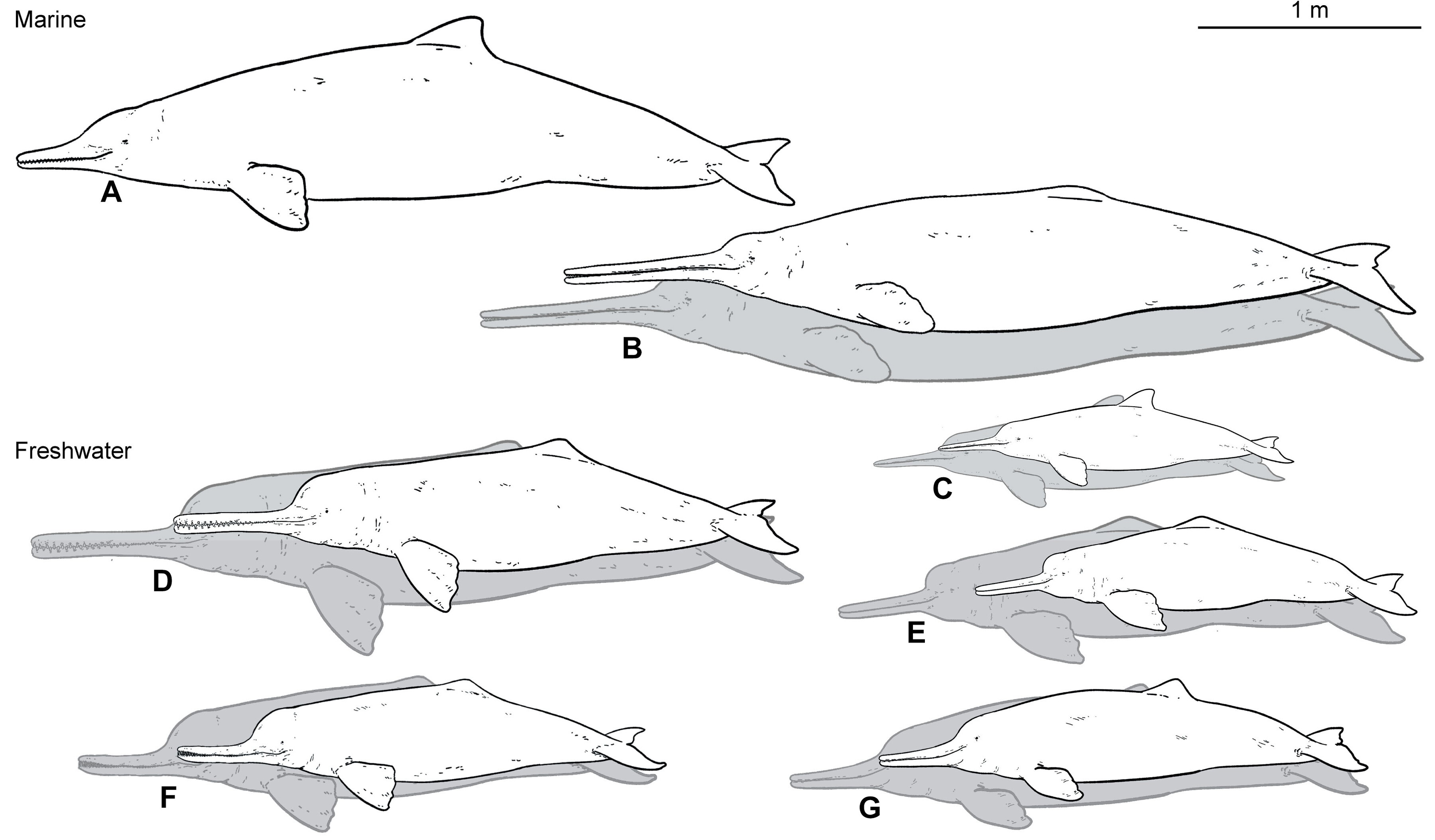
Pebanista (D) compared to various platanistids and other river dolphins.

The skull of Pebanista has a bizygomatic width of 28.1 cm (11.1 in) and a preserved condylobasal length of 69.8 cm (27.5 in). Given the fusion among the individual skull bones, it is inferred that the holotype skull was that of an adult animal. Based on the bizygomatic width, the type specimen was estimated to have had a total body length of approximately 2.8 m (9 ft 2 in). Furthermore, the size of the much less complete referred specimens may indicate even greater lengths were possible. MUSM 3593, a snout fragment, could have belonged to an animal 3.47 m (11.4 ft) long.

However, it is noted by Benites-Palomino and colleagues that regression equations using bizygomatic width, as used in calculating these results, could underestimate the lengths of taxa with highly elongated snouts. Alternatively, the condylobasal length of the skull could be used in order to determine total body length, but since this value is not known in full for Pebanista it has been proposed that the range indicated by the bizygomatic width should be treated as the minimum. Regardless, even these lower estimates exceed the size of any modern river dolphin, which grow up to a maximum length of only around 2.5 m (8 ft 2 in).

== Phylogeny ==
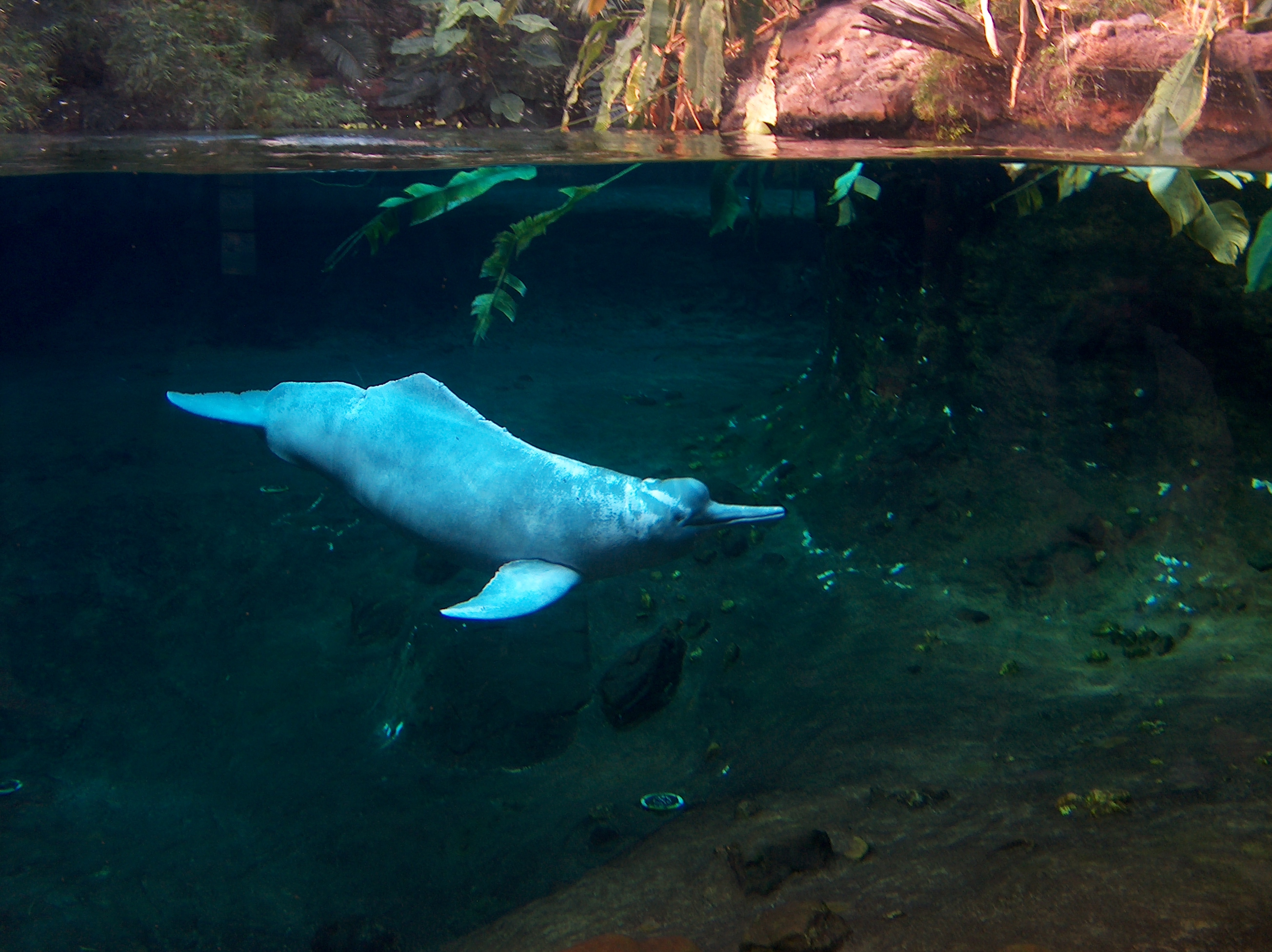
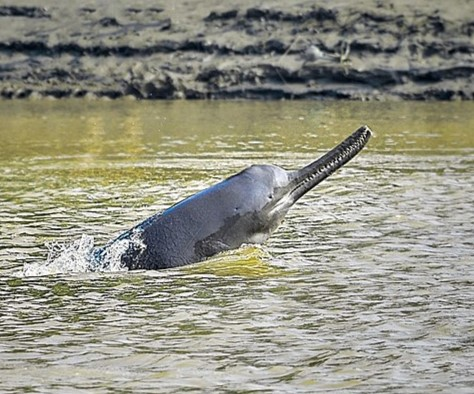
Although Pebanista inhabits the same region as modern Amazon river dolphins (top), they are more closely related to the Ganges river dolphin of Asia (bottom).

All phylogenetic analyses conducted in the type description recovered Pebanista to be a member of the Platanistidae, a family of toothed whales that include the modern Indus and Ganges river dolphin alongside a variety of marine forms. The initial analysis, conducted using equal weighting of characters, was poorly resolved, its clades often weakly supported and with several polytomies. Subsequent analyses were conducted using implied weighting of characters, greatly improving the resolution of the results. These analyses recover two well supported clades within Platanistidae, one formed by Pomatodelphis and Zarhachis, and another formed by Pebanista and Platanista. This means that Pebanista is the closest known relative to the only extant members of the family.

- - other Odontoceti
  - - Eurhinodelphinidae†
    - Platanistoidea
      - - Zarhinocetus†
        - - Allodelphis†
          - Ninjadelphis†
      - Platanidephidi
        - - MUSM 603
          - Ensidelphis†
        - - - Phocageneus†
            - Dilophodelphis†
            - - Macrosqualodelphis†
              - - Notocetus†
                - - Furcacetus†
                  - Huaridelphis†
                  - - Squalodelphis†
                    - Medocinia†
          - Platanistidae
            - Araeodelphis†
            - - - Pomatodelphis†
                - Zarhachis†
              - - Pebanista yacuruna†
                - Platanista

== Evolutionary History ==
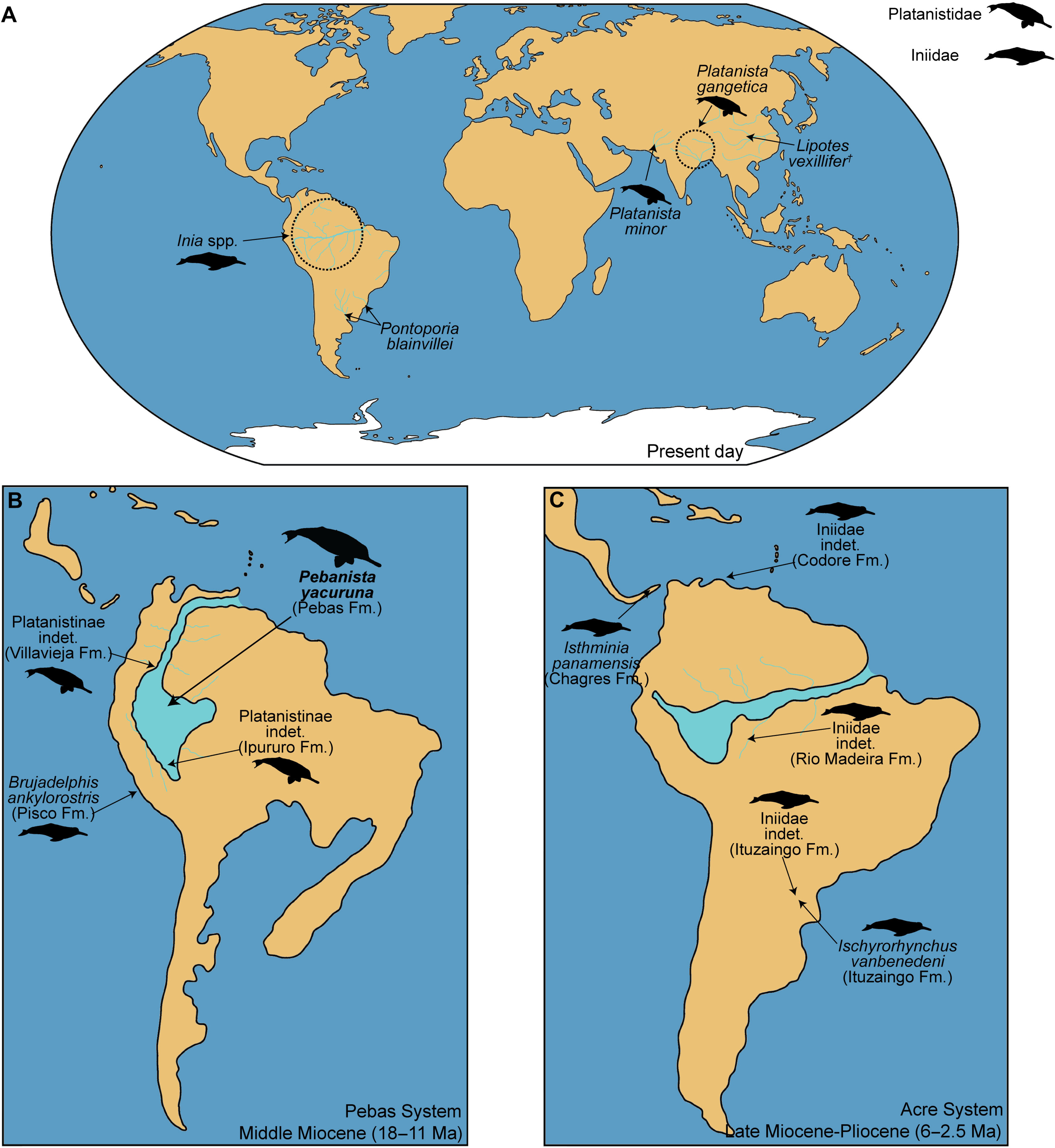
Distribution of iniid and platanistid "river dolphins" in the Pebas Wetlands (B)

Of the once diverse clade Platanistoidea, only two species are still alive today, the Ganges river dolphín (Platanista gangetica) and the Indus river dolphin (Platanista minor), both of which are largely restricted to their namesake river systems in South Asia. During the Oligocene and Miocene members of this group were much more widespread, occurring across the world in marine strata and developing a wide range of forms that occupied different niches. Platanistids are thought to have reached their peak during the Early Miocene amidst global cooling, but began to decline towards the Middle Miocene when sperm whales, beaked whales and delphinoids began to emerge.

Toothed whales are known to have transitioned from marine environments into freshwater habitats multiple times throughout their evolutionary history, with four distinct groups of such "river dolphins" persisting into the Holocene (although Lipotidae have recently gone extinct while Pontoporiidae are not strictly freshwater animals). The salt-to freshwater transition of the Iniidae (South American river dolphins) is hypothesized to have occurred at some point towards the Late Miocene given the appearance of Ischyrorhynchus in rivers and deltas of Argentina during this time period, while marine forms persisted until the Pliocene. Platanistids meanwhile appear to have first ventured into freshwater during the Early to Middle Miocene, as evidenced not only by Pebanista but also based on the discovery of Platanista-like earbones recovered from La Venta (Colombia) and the Fitzcarrald Arch (Peru) that could represent close relatives.

== Paleobiology ==
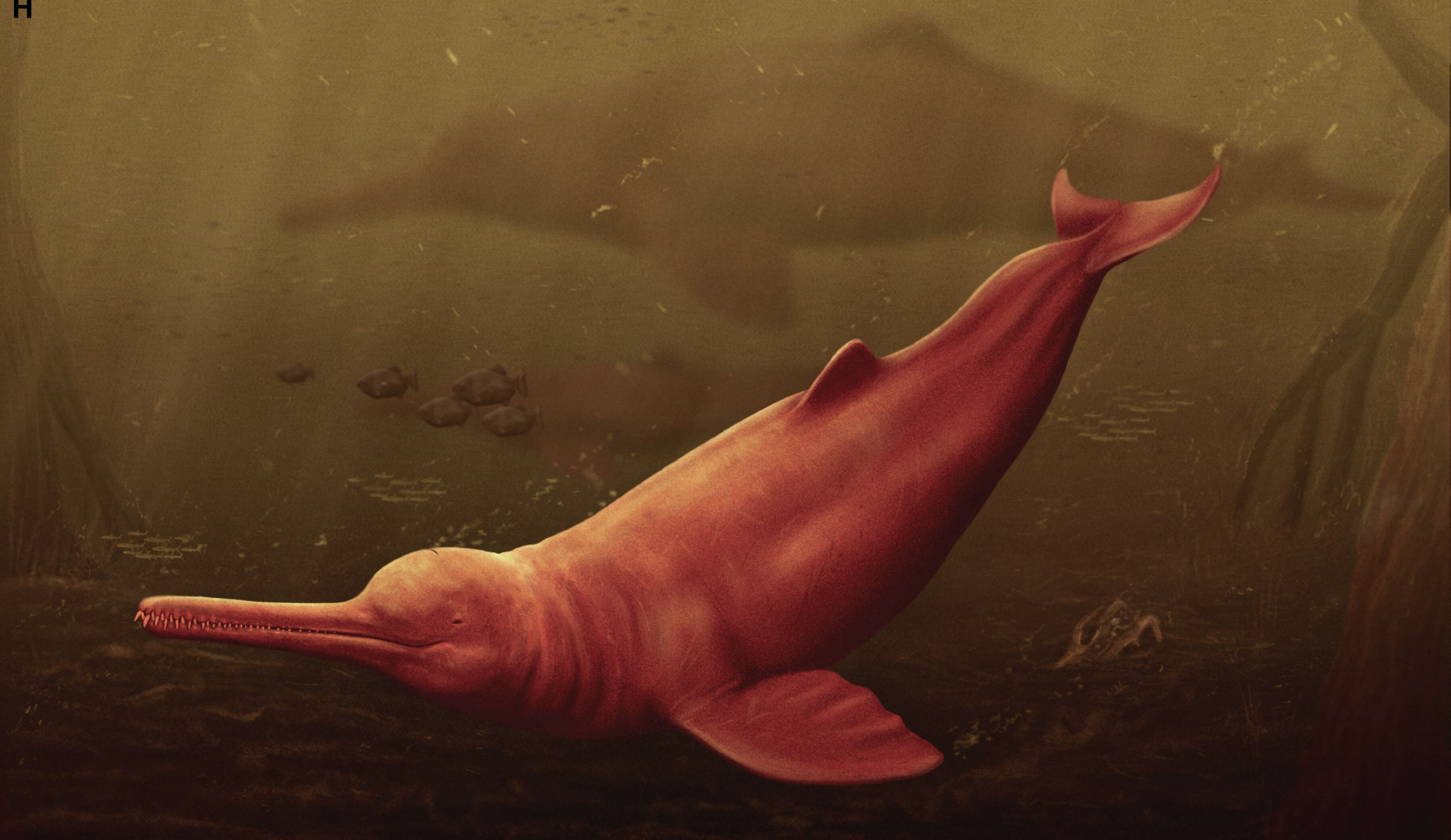
Pebanista yacuruna live reconstruction by Jaime Bran

During the Early and Middle Miocene large areas of what is now the Amazon rainforest used to be covered by an extensive wetland system. This wetland, known as the Pebas System or Pebas Megawetlands, was subject to at least two marine incursions and featured both freshwater and brackish environments that housed a highly diverse ecosystem. In addition to Pebanista, the fossils of giant crocodilians, turtles, fish, various ungulates and sloths are all known from localities corresponding with the wetland system. The presence of gharials, a group of longirostrine crocodilians, is highlighted in particular given the many parallels to platanistids. Both Pebanista and Gryposuchus, one of the many native gharials, descend from marine ancestors before diversifying further inland, growing to sizes much larger than their extant kin (which are all restricted to South Asia). The increase in size may be related to the abundance of prey items these animals would have found within the wetlands, allowing Pebanista to maintain a body size similar to its marine relatives. The anatomy of Pebanista does support the hypothesis that it was an active raptorial animal, possessing enlarged teeth, a robust snout and prominent skeletal features that serve as insertion points for powerful musculature.

The supraorbital crests show some areas of varying density, with the outer section being denser than those more medially (aided by the presenve of cavities along the medial edge). Given that the supraorbital crests arch across the upper surface of the skull and are concave along their inner surface, thus covering the melon, it has been suggested that the crests served as a tool to focus the sound waves emitted by the animals biosonar. As suggested by Benites-Palomino and colleagues, the anatomy of the supraorbital crest in Pebanista may be a step towards what we now see in Platanista. In the extant species, the crest is even more developed, with echolocation serving such a dominant function in locating prey in murky water that modern Platanista are nearly blind.
