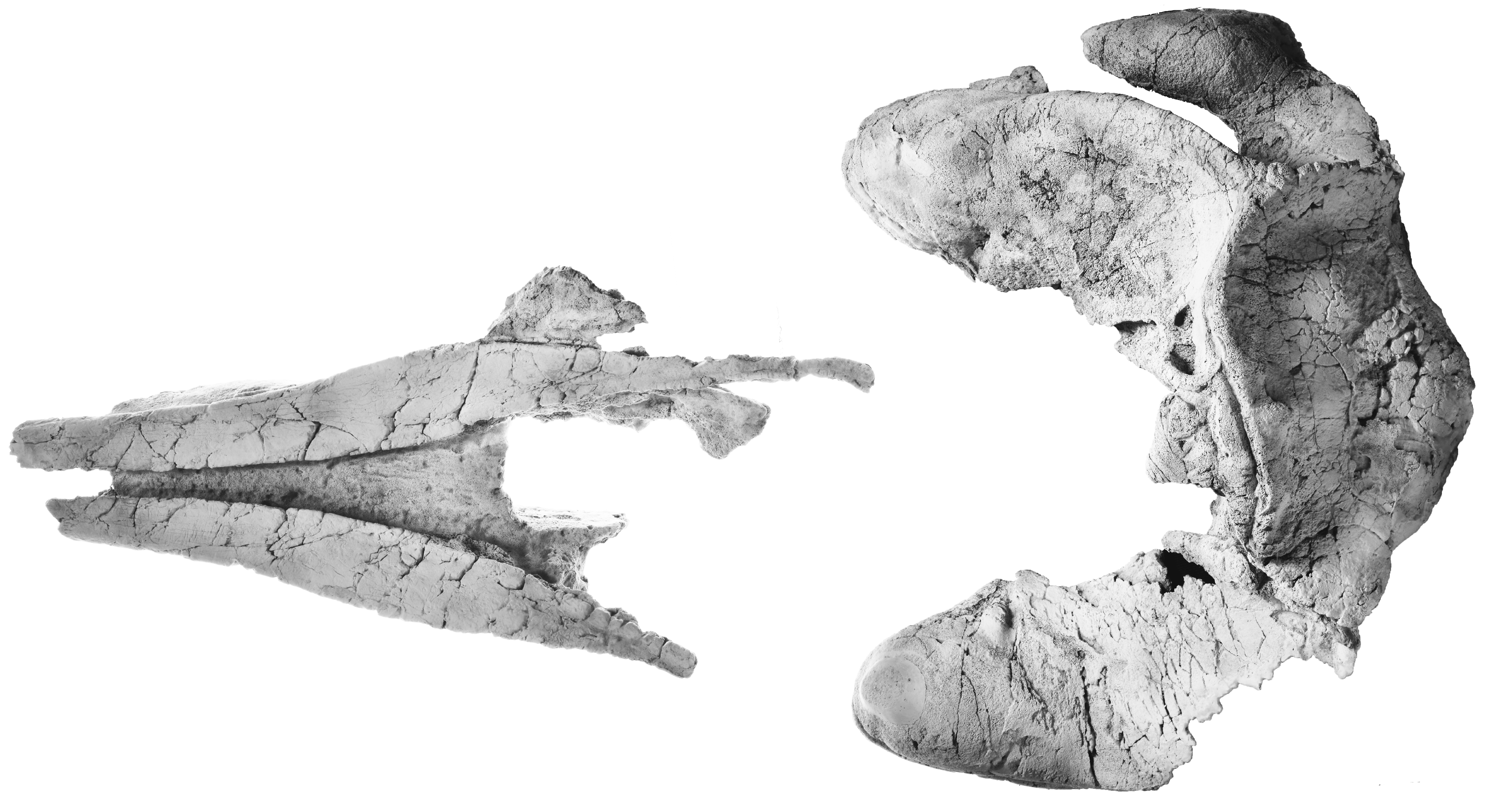
- Holotype skull seen from above

Scientific classification
- Kingdom: Animalia
- Phylum: Chordata
- Class: Mammalia
- Order: Artiodactyla
- Infraorder: Cetacea
- Family: †Squalodelphinidae
- Genus: †Fordycetus; Tanaka et al., 2026

Type species
- Fordycetus taitonga Tanaka et al., 2026

= Fordycetus =

Fordycetus Temporal range: Early Miocene, ~21.7–15.9 Ma

Extinct dolphin genus

Fordycetus is an extinct genus of squalodelphinid dolphin, known from the Early Miocene (Aquitanian–Burdigalian ages) Mount Harris Formation of North Otago, New Zealand. The genus contains a single species, Fordycetus taitonga, described in 2026 based on a partial skull and cervical (neck) vertebra. It is the first squalodelphinid to be discovered in New Zealand and the southwest Pacific region.

The holotype specimen of F. taitonga is estimated to belong to an individual with at least 2.7 metres (8.9 ft) in total body length. The closest living relatives of Fordycetus are the river dolphins in the family Platanistidae.

== Classification ==
As Fordycetus is a squalodelphinid, its closest extant relatives are the Ganges and Indus river dolphins, the only living species of the river dolphin family Platanistidae, native to the Indian subcontinent. A simplified version of the phylogenetic analysis done by Tanaka et al. (2026) is shown in the cladogram below:

- Platanistoidea
  - †Allodelphinidae
  - Platanidelphidi
    - Platanistidae
    - †Squalodelphinidae
      - †Miodelphinus miensis
      - - †Phocageneus venustus
        - - †Macrosqualodelphis ukupachai
          - - †Fordycetus taitonga
            - †Squalodelphis fabianii
          - - †Notocetus vanbenedeni
            - - †Furcacetus flexirostrum
              - - MUSM 1395 3896 3897 1484
                - - - †Huaridelphis raimondii
                    - †Medocinia tetragorhina
                  - - †Aondelphis talen
                    - - †Araeodelphis natator
                      - †Dilophodelphis fordycei
