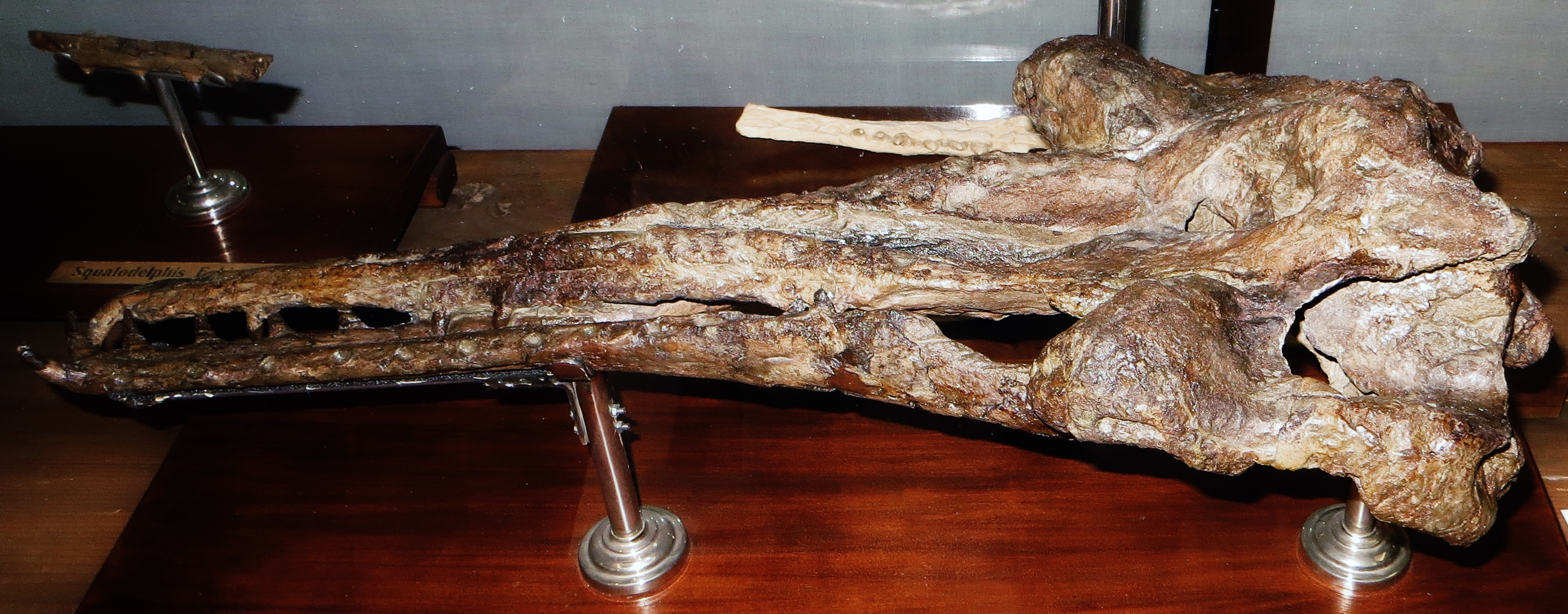
- Skull of Squalodelphis fabianii

Scientific classification
- Kingdom: Animalia
- Phylum: Chordata
- Class: Mammalia
- Order: Artiodactyla
- Infraorder: Cetacea
- Family: †Squalodelphinidae
- Genus: †Squalodelphis; Dal Piaz, 1917
- Species: †S. fabianii

Binomial name
- †Squalodelphis fabianii Dal Piaz, 1917

= Squalodelphis =

Squalodelphis Temporal range: 23.0–20.4 Ma

Extinct genus of river dolphin

Squalodelphis is an extinct genus of river dolphin from the early Miocene belonging to Squalodelphinidae, containing only its type species Squalodelphis fabianii. Known remains have been found in Italy and Germany.

== Taxonomy ==
Squalodelphis is the type genus of the family Squalodelphinidae, which also includes the genera Huaridelphis, Notocetus, Phocageneus, Macrosqualodelphis, Medocinia, and Furcacetus. Throughout its history, it has been moved several times between Squalodelphinidae (previously Squalodelphidae) and Ziphiidae.

== Description ==
Squalodelphis differs from Huaridelphis and Macrosqualodelphis in having a dorsal opening of the mesorostral groove broader than that of the premaxilla in the rostral base and lower tooth count, and from Macrosqualodelphis in having a transversely narrower nuchal crest as well as the left and right frontals being of unequal length at the vertex.

== Distribution ==
The type species of Squaloziphius, S. fabianii, is known from the Libano sandstone formation, in the Veneto region of northeastern Italy. Fossils have also been found in the Baltringen region of Germany.
