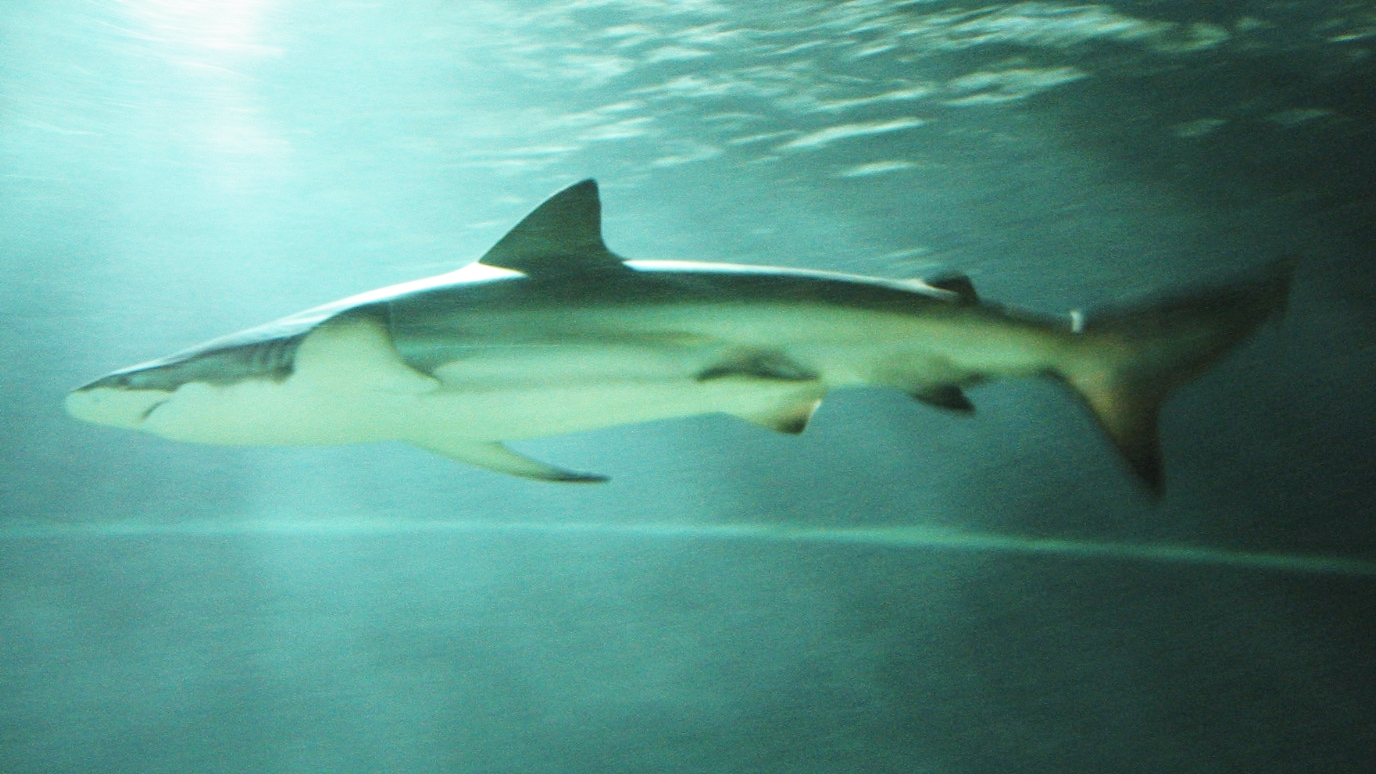

Conservation status
- Vulnerable (IUCN 3.1)

Scientific classification
- Kingdom: Animalia
- Phylum: Chordata
- Class: Chondrichthyes
- Subclass: Elasmobranchii
- Division: Selachii
- Order: Carcharhiniformes
- Family: Carcharhinidae
- Genus: Carcharhinus
- Species: C. brachyurus

Binomial name
- Carcharhinus brachyurus (Günther, 1870)
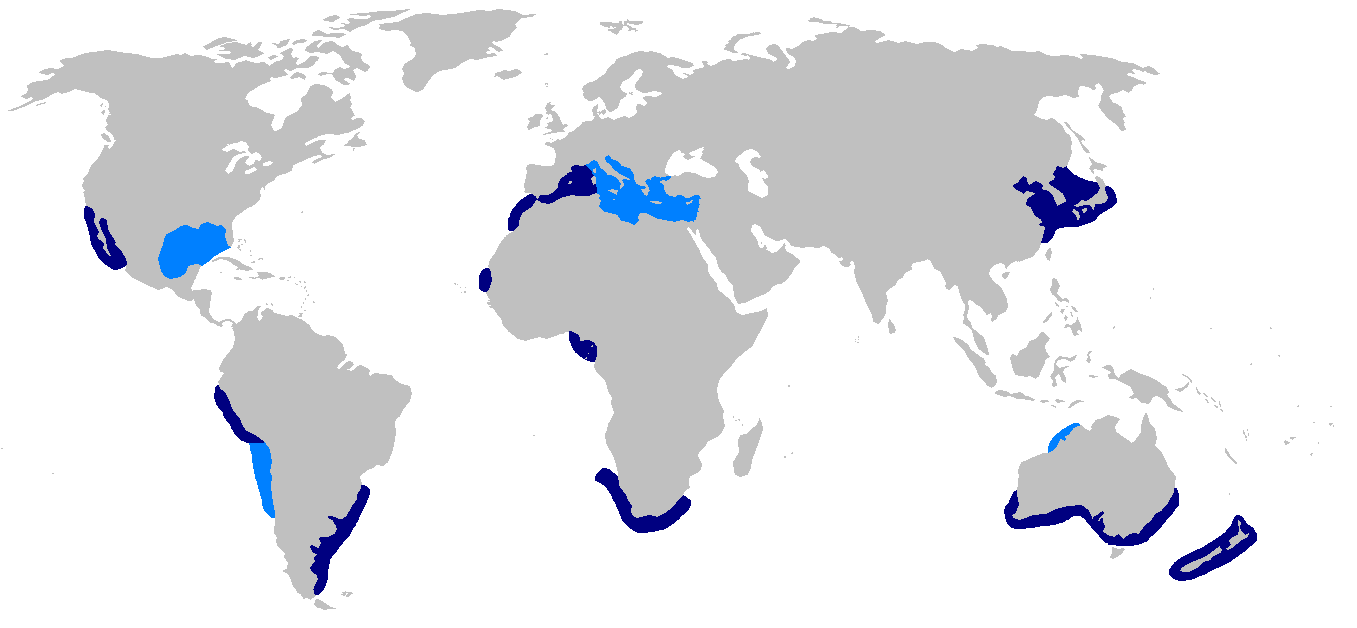
- Confirmed (dark blue) and suspected (light blue) range of the copper shark

Synonyms
- Carcharhinus acarenatus Moreno & Hoyos, 1983; Carcharhinus improvisus Smith, 1952; Carcharhinus remotoides Deng, Xiong & Zhan, 1981; Carcharhinus rochensis Abella, 1972; Carcharias brachyurus Günther, 1870; Carcharias lamiella Jordan & Gilbert, 1882; Carcharias remotus Duméril, 1865; Eulamia ahenea Stead, 1938; Galeolamna greyi*Owen, 1853 *ambiguous synonym

= Copper shark =

Copper shark Temporal range: Early Miocene to present

Species of shark

The copper shark (Carcharhinus brachyurus), bronze whaler, or narrowtooth shark is a species of requiem shark found mostly in temperate latitudes. It is distributed in a number of separate populations in the northeastern and southwestern Atlantic, off southern Africa, in the northwestern and eastern Pacific, and around Australia and New Zealand, with scattered reports from equatorial regions. The species can be found from brackish rivers and estuaries to shallow bays and harbors, to offshore waters 100 m (330 ft) deep or more. Females are found apart from males for most of the year, and conduct seasonal migrations. A large species reaching 3.3 m (11 ft) long, the copper shark is difficult to distinguish from other large requiem sharks. It is characterized by its narrow, hook-shaped upper teeth, lack of a prominent ridge between the dorsal fins, and plain bronze coloration.

Feeding mainly on cephalopods, bony fishes, and other cartilaginous fishes, the copper shark is a fast-swimming predator that has been known to hunt in large groups, using their numbers to their advantage; however, for most of the time they remain solitary. Off South Africa, this species associates closely with the annual sardine run, involving millions of southern African pilchard (Sardinops sagax). Like other requiem sharks, it is viviparous, with the developing embryos mainly nourished through a placental connection formed from the depleted yolk sac. Females bear litters of 7 to 24 pups every other year in coastal nursery areas, after a gestation period of 12 or perhaps as long as 21 months. It is extremely slow-growing, with males and females not reaching maturity until 13–19 and 19–20 years of age respectively.

This species is valued by commercial and recreational fisheries throughout its range, and utilized as food. The species population size is unknown, but the IUCN's Red List assesses the species as vulnerable because it is very susceptible to population depletion due to its low growth and reproductive rates and because its numbers are believed to have declined in some areas.

Copper sharks attack humans infrequently, but the species places tenth in the number of unprovoked attacks on people. However, the actual number of recorded shark attacks is low – 15 non-fatal, unprovoked attacks and only one fatal unprovoked attack.

== Taxonomy ==
Because of its very patchy range, the copper shark has been scientifically described several times from different locales. The earliest valid description is presently considered to be British zoologist Albert Günther's account of Carcharias brachyurus in the 1870 eighth volume of Catalogue of the fishes in the British Museum. The earliest name was once thought to be Auguste Duméril's 1865 Carcharias remotus, until it was found that the type specimen associated with that name is actually a blacknose shark (C. acronotus). Thus, this shark was often referred to as C. remotus in older literature. An even earlier name, Richard Owen's 1853 Galeolamna greyi, is of questionable taxonomic status as it was based solely on a set of now-destroyed jaws that may or may not have belonged to a copper shark. Modern authors have assigned this species to the genus Carcharhinus.

The specific epithet brachyurus is derived from the Greek brachys ("short") and oura ("tail"). The name "whaler" originated in the 19th century, applied by the crews of whaling vessels in the Pacific who saw large sharks of various species congregating around harpooned whale carcasses. This species may also be referred to as black-tipped whaler, cocktail shark or cocktail whaler, or New Zealand whaler, as well as by the shortened "bronze", "bronzie", or "cocktail". Günther originally referred to four syntypes: a stuffed specimen from Antarctica and another from New Zealand, which have since been lost, and two fetuses from Australia that were later discovered to be bull sharks (C. leucas). In the interests of taxonomic stability, in 1982 Jack Garrick designated a 2.4 m (7.9 ft) long female caught off Whanganui, New Zealand, as a new type specimen.

== Phylogeny and evolution ==
The first efforts to determine the evolutionary relationships of the copper shark were based on morphology and returned inconclusive results: in 1982 Jack Garrick placed it by itself as a grouping within Carcharhinus, while in 1988 Leonard Compagno placed it in an informal "transitional group" that also contained the blacknose shark (C. acronotus), the blacktip reef shark (C. melanopterus), the nervous shark (C. cautus), the silky shark (C. falciformis), and the night shark (C. signatus). Gavin Naylor's 1992 allozyme study concluded that the closest relative of the copper shark is the spinner shark (C. brevipinna), but could not resolve their wider relationships with the rest of the genus. Fossilized teeth from the copper shark have been recovered from the Chilcatay Formation in Peru dating to the Early Miocene, Pungo River in North Carolina, dating to the Miocene (23–5.3 Ma), from Tuscany, dating to the Pliocene (5.3–2.6 Ma), and from Costa Mesa in California, dating to the Late Pleistocene (126,000–12,000 years ago). They may potentially date to the Early Oligocene.

== Distribution and habitat ==
The copper shark is the only member of its genus largely found in temperate rather than tropical waters, in temperatures above 12 °C (54 °F). It is widely distributed but as disjunct regional populations with little to no interchange between them. In the Atlantic, this shark occurs from the Mediterranean Sea to Morocco and the Canary Islands, off Argentina, and off Namibia and South Africa (where there may be two separate populations), with infrequent records from Mauritania, the Gulf of Guinea, and possibly the Gulf of Mexico. In the Indo-Pacific, it is found from the East China Sea to Japan (excluding Hokkaido) and southern Russia, off southern Australia (mostly between Sydney and Perth but occasionally further north), and around New Zealand but not as far as the Kermadec Islands; there are also unconfirmed reports from the Seychelles and the Gulf of Thailand. In the eastern Pacific, it occurs from northern Chile to Peru, and from Mexico to Point Conception, California, including the Gulf of California. The copper shark is common off parts of Argentina, South Africa, Australia, and New Zealand, and rare elsewhere; in many areas its range is ill-defined because of confusion with other species. The shark is one of the most commonly found in the waters of New Zealand.

Copper sharks can be found from the surf zone to slightly beyond the continental shelf in the open ocean, diving to depths of 100 m (330 ft) or more. This species commonly enters very shallow habitats, including bays, shoals, and harbors, and also inhabits rocky areas and offshore islands. It is tolerant of low and changing salinities, and has been reported from estuaries and the lower reaches of large rivers. Juveniles inhabit inshore waters less than 30 m (98 ft) deep throughout the year, while adults tend to be found further offshore and regularly approach the coast only in spring and summer, when large aggregations can be readily observed in shallow water.

Populations of copper sharks in both hemispheres perform seasonal migrations, in response to temperature changes, reproductive events, and/or prey availability; the movement patterns differ with sex and age. Adult females and juveniles spend winter in the subtropics and generally shift to higher latitudes as spring nears, with pregnant females also moving towards the coast to give birth in inshore nursery areas. Adult males remain in the subtropics for most of the year, except in late winter or spring when they also move into higher latitudes, in time to encounter and mate with post-partum females dispersing from the nurseries. During migrations, individual sharks have been recorded traveling up to 1,320 km (820 mi). It is philopatric, returning to the same areas year after year.

The oldest evidence for a copper shark nursery in the fossil record is known from the Pisco Basin of Peru, with its evidence being preserved in the Chilcatay and Pisco Formations, from the Early Miocene to the Late Miocene.

== Description ==
The copper shark has a slender, streamlined body with a slightly arched profile just behind the head. The snout is rather long and pointed, with the nostrils preceded by low flaps of skin. The round, moderately large eyes are equipped with nictitating membranes (protective third eyelids). The mouth has short, subtle furrows at the corners and contains 29–35 upper tooth rows and 29–33 lower tooth rows. The teeth are serrated with single narrow cusps; the upper teeth have a distinctive hooked shape and become more angled towards the corners of the jaw, while the lower teeth are upright. The upper teeth of adult males are longer, narrower, more curved, and more finely serrated than those of adult females and juveniles. The five pairs of gill slits are fairly long.

The pectoral fins are large, pointed, and falcate (sickle-shaped). The first dorsal fin is tall, with a pointed apex and a concave trailing margin; its origin lies about even with the tips of the pectoral fins. The second dorsal fin is small and low, and positioned about opposite to the anal fin. There is usually no ridge between the dorsal fins. The caudal fin has a well-developed lower lobe and a deep ventral notch near the tip of the upper lobe. This species is bronze to olive-gray above with a metallic sheen and sometimes a pink cast, darkening towards the fin tips and margins but not conspicuously so; the color fades quickly to a dull gray-brown after death. The underside is white, which extends onto the flanks as a prominent band. The copper shark is easily mistaken for other large Carcharhinus species, particularly the dusky shark (C. obscurus), but can be identified by its upper tooth shape, absent or weak interdorsal ridge, and lack of obvious fin markings. It reportedly reaches a maximum length of 3.3 m (11 ft) and weight of 305 kilograms (672 lb).

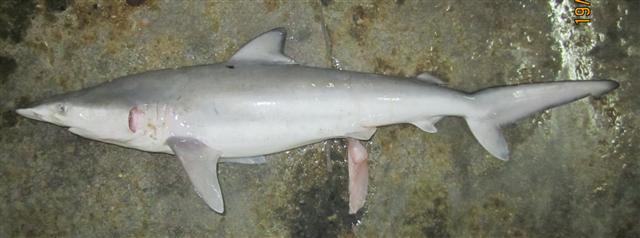
The copper shark can be difficult to distinguish from other large Carcharhinus species

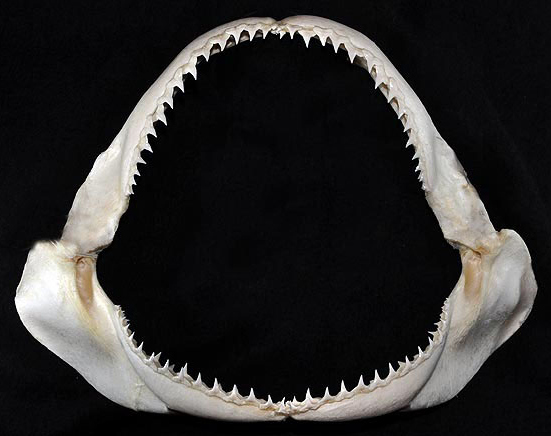
Jaws

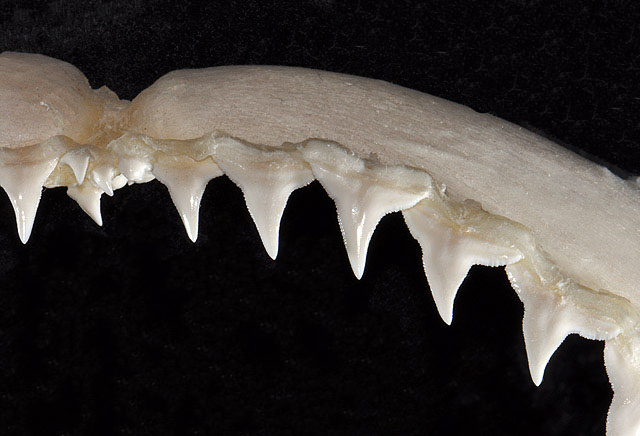
Upper teeth

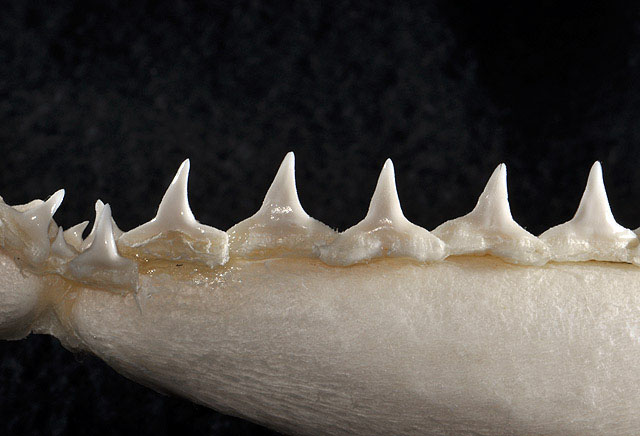
Lower teeth

== Biology and ecology ==
Fast but active, the copper shark may be encountered alone, in pairs, or in loosely organized schools containing up to hundreds of individuals. Some aggregations seem to form for reproductive purposes, while others form to concentrations of food. This species may fall prey to larger sharks and killer whales. Known parasites of the copper shark include the tapeworms Cathetocephalus australis, Dasyrhynchus pacificus and D. talismani, Floriceps minacanthus, Phoreiobothrium robertsoni, and Pseudogrillotia spratti, the leech Stibarobdella macrothela, and the fluke Otodistomum veliporum.

=== Feeding ===
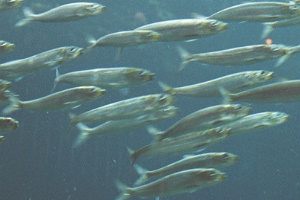
Southern African pilchard are the most important prey species of copper sharks off South Africa.

The copper shark feeds more towards the bottom of the water column than the top, consuming cephalopods, including squid (Loligo spp.), cuttlefishes, and octopus; bony fishes, including gurnards, flatfishes, hakes, catfishes, jacks, Australian salmon, Atlantic salmon, mullets, sea breams, smelts, tunas, sardines, Cape horse mackerel, and anchovies; and cartilaginous fishes, including dogfish sharks (Squalus spp.), stingrays, skates, electric rays, and sawfishes. Cephalopods and cartilaginous fishes become relatively more important food for sharks over 2 m (6.6 ft) long. Young sharks also consume scyphozoan jellyfish and crustaceans, including mud shrimps (Callianassa) and penaeid prawns. It does not attack marine mammals, though it has been known to scavenge (rarely) on dolphins that had succumbed to fishing nets. The predominant prey of this species off South Africa is the southern African pilchard (Sardinops sagax), which comprise 69–95% of its diet. Every winter, schools of copper sharks follow the "run" of the pilchard from the Eastern Cape to KwaZulu-Natal. The gathering of millions of forage fish attract a multitude of predators, including several species of sharks, of which copper sharks are the most numerous.

Large numbers of copper sharks have been observed hunting together in a seemingly cooperative fashion. Small schooling fish are "herded" into a tight ball, whereupon each shark swims through in turn with its mouth open to feed. For groups of tuna and larger prey, the pursuing sharks may adopt a "wing" formation to force their quarry closer together, with each shark targeting a particular fish and attacking in turn. In False Bay, South Africa, this species reportedly follows seine net fishing vessels.

=== Life history ===
Like other members of its family, the copper shark is viviparous, in which the yolk sac of the developing embryo, once depleted, is converted into a placental connection through which the mother delivers nourishment. Adult females have one functional ovary, on the right, and two functional uteruses. The male bites the female as a prelude to mating. In the Southern Hemisphere, mating takes place from October to December (spring and early summer), when both sexes have migrated into offshore waters at higher latitudes. Birthing seems to occur from June to January, peaking in October and November.

Female copper sharks make use of shallow inshore habitats, varying from stretches of open coast to more sheltered bays and inlets, as nurseries. These nurseries provide abundant food and reduce the likelihood of predation by larger members of the species. Known and suspected nursery areas occur off northern North Island from Waimea Inlet to Hawke Bay for New Zealand sharks, off Albany, in and around Gulf St Vincent, and in Port Phillip Bay for Australian sharks, off Niigata (Japan) for northwestern Pacific sharks, off the Eastern Cape for South Africa sharks, off Rhodes (Greece), Nice (France), and Al Hoceima (Morocco) for Mediterranean sharks, off Río de Oro (Western Sahara) for northwest African sharks, off Rio de Janeiro (Brazil) and Buenos Aires and Bahía Blanca (Argentina) for southwestern Atlantic sharks, and off Paita and Guanape Cove (Peru), in Sebastián Vizcaíno Bay (Mexico), and in and around San Diego Bay for eastern Pacific sharks.

Most sources estimate a gestation period of 12 months, though some data support the interpretation of a 15–21 month long gestation period instead. Females produce litters every other year, with the number of pups ranging from 7 to 24 and averaging 15 or 16. Females off California and the Baja Peninsula tend to bear fewer young relative to other parts of the world. The newborns measure 55–67 cm (22–26 in) long. The copper shark is among the slowest-growing Carcharhinus species: off South Africa, males reach sexual maturity at 2.0–2.4 m (6.6–7.9 ft) long and an age of 13–19 years, while females mature at 2.3–2.5 m (7.5–8.2 ft) long and an age of 19–20 years. Females off Australia mature at a comparable length of 2.5 m (8.2 ft), while females off Argentina mature at a slightly smaller length of 2.2 m (7.2 ft). The maximum lifespan is at least 30 years for males and 25 years for females.

== Human interactions ==
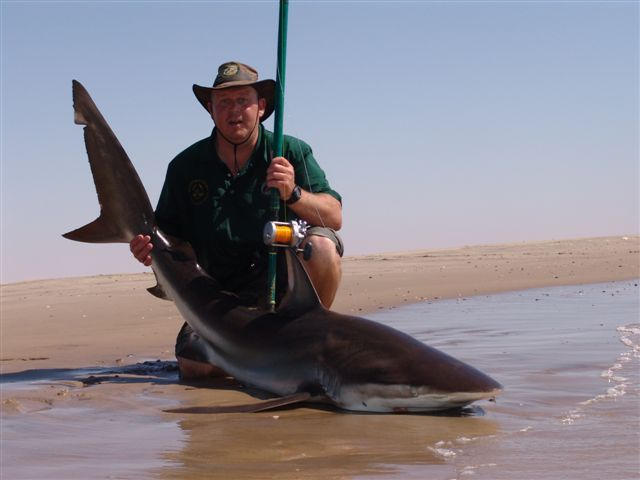
The copper shark is often caught by recreational anglers.

=== Attacks on humans ===
Copper sharks attack humans infrequently, but the species places tenth in the number of unprovoked attacks on people. During the tracking period through 2013, the University of Florida attributed 20 attacks to the species. (In comparison, great white sharks topped the list, with 279 attacks.) the copper shark is not particularly aggressive towards humans unless in the presence of food. Copper Sharks have been known to harass and attack spear fishers in an attempt to steal catches. Copper sharks have bitten several swimmers in Australia and New Zealand, where the species is common. (The species is commonly called bronze whalers in this part of the world.)

Fatal attacks attributed to the copper shark (bronze whaler) include the 2014 death of a swimmer in Tathra, New South Wales, Australia, and the 1976 death of a swimmer in Te Kaha, New Zealand. Three out of ten shark attacks in New Zealand are attributed to Copper sharks. Witnesses also attributed a fatal attack in September 2011 in Bunker Bay, Western Australia to a copper shark.

One problem with counting attacks on humans is that the copper shark is very similar to other requiem sharks, leading victims and witnesses to be unlikely to identify which type of Carcharhinus shark was responsible for an attack. Experts trying to confirm shark attacks by species warn that their statistics undercount the number of attacks by requiem sharks like the copper.

=== Captivity ===
Like many large, active sharks, this species adapts poorly to captivity; it tends to bump into the sides of its enclosure, and the resulting abrasions then become infected with often fatal consequences.

=== Fishing ===
Commercial fisheries for the copper shark exist off New Zealand, Australia (though the "bronze whaler fishery" of Western Australia actually takes mostly dusky sharks), South Africa, Brazil, Uruguay, Argentina, Mexico, and China; it also contributes to the bycatch of other commercial fisheries across its range. This species is caught in gillnets and on bottom longlines, and to a much lesser extent in bottom trawls and on pelagic longlines. The meat is sold for human consumption. The copper shark is also popular with recreational fishers in Namibia, New Zealand, Australia, South Africa, Argentina, Mexico and California, predominantly by anglers but also by bowfishers and gillnetters. In New Zealand, it is the Carcharhinus species most frequently caught by sport fishers and sustains a small, summer recreational fishery in northern North Island, that mainly captures pregnant and post-partum females and for the most part practices tag and release. A tag and release program is also practiced in Namibia.

=== Conservation ===
The International Union for Conservation of Nature (IUCN) has assessed the copper shark as vulnerable worldwide. While the global population is unknown, the long maturation time and low reproductive rate of this species render it highly susceptible to overfishing. Regionally, the IUCN has listed this species under Least Concern off Australia, New Zealand, and South Africa, where fisheries are generally well-managed; the local copper shark population for each of those three countries is contained almost entirely within their respective Exclusive Economic Zones (EEZ). Reported catches by New Zealand have steadily declined from a peak of 40 tons in 1995/96 to 20 tons 2001/02, though it is uncertain whether this reflects a genuine decline or changing fishing habits.

In the eastern Pacific, the copper shark is rare and little fishery information is available, leading to an assessment of Data Deficient. However, catch declines across all shark and ray species have been documented in the heavily-fished Gulf of California. Off East Asia, the copper shark has been assessed as Vulnerable; though species-specific data is unavailable, shark populations overall have been decimated in the region. The number of large adults have been too low to sustain targeted fisheries since the 1970s, and most of the current shark catch consists of small juveniles. Additional threats to this species include the degradation and destruction of its coastal nurseries from development, pollution, and aquaculture, mortality from shark nets used to protect beaches in South Africa and Australia, and persecution by fish farmers in southern Australia.

The New Zealand Department of Conservation has classified the copper shark as "Not Threatened" under the New Zealand Threat Classification System but with the qualifiers "Conservation Dependent", "Data Poor" and "Secure Overseas".
