= Amphidelphis =

Amphidelphis Temporal range: 23.0-15.9 Ma (Aquitanian-Burdigalian)

Scientific classification
- Kingdom: Animalia
- Phylum: Chordata
- Class: Mammalia
- Order: Artiodactyla
- Infraorder: Cetacea
- Parvorder: Odontoceti
- Genus: †Amphidelphis; Lambert et al., 2025

Type species
- †Acrodelphis bakersfieldensis Wilson, 1935

Extinct genus of toothed whale from the Miocene

Amphidelphis is a genus of extinct toothed whale from the Early Miocene (Aquitanian-Burdigalian) of the United States and Peru. The type and only species is A. bakersfieldensis. Its holotype specimen (YPM 13406) was found in California and was described and named Acrodelphis bakersfieldensis by Wilson in 1935. The specimen was later referred to Argyrocetus by Barnes in 1976 before being recombined by Olivier Lambert, Christian Muizon and colleagues in a 2025 study. This study also referred an additional specimen: a cranium from the Chilcatay Formation of Peru's Eastern Pisco Basin. The name Amphidelphis comes from the Ancient Greek amphi, meaning 'from both sides' and the Latin delphis, which means 'dolphin'. The name references the fact that remains of the genus have been found on both sides of the Americas.
