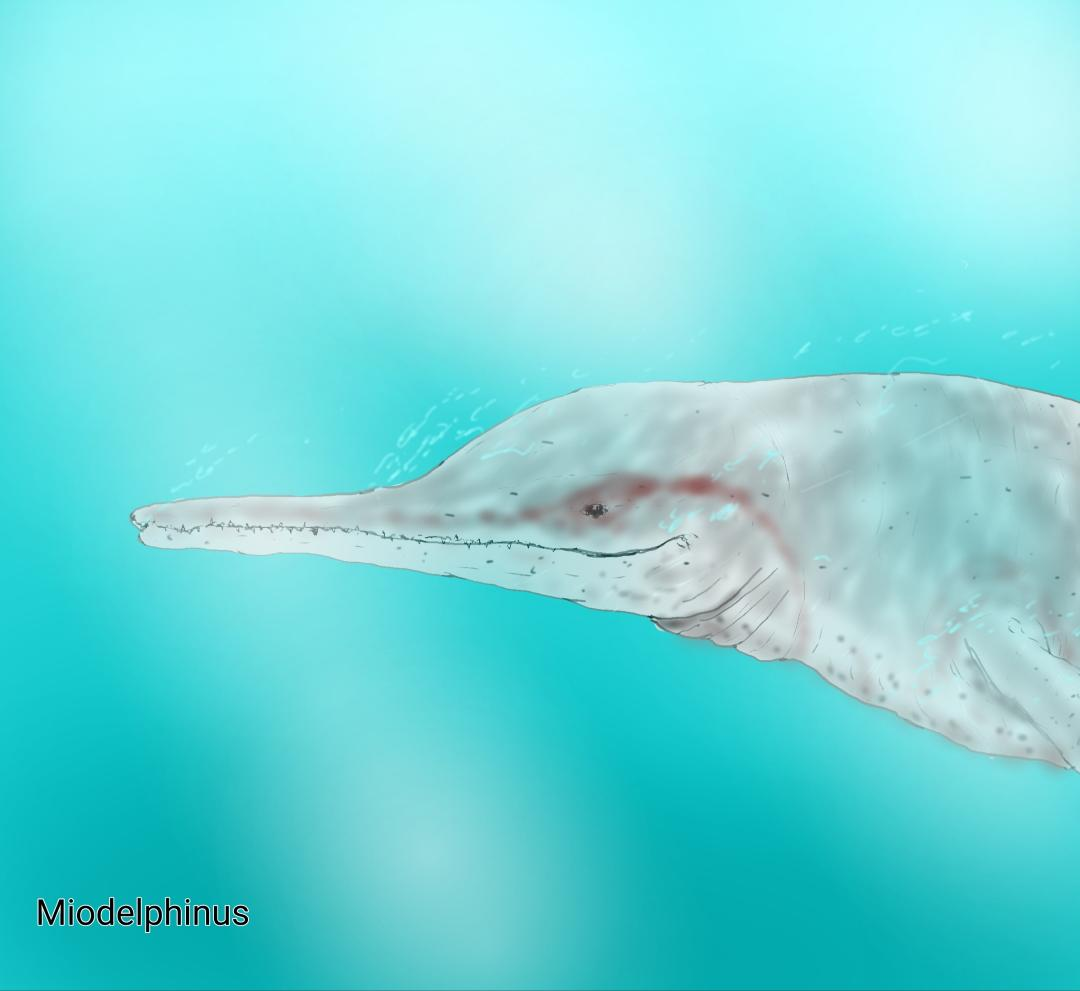

Scientific classification
- Kingdom: Animalia
- Phylum: Chordata
- Class: Mammalia
- Infraclass: Placentalia
- Order: Artiodactyla
- Infraorder: Cetacea
- Family: †Squalodelphinidae
- Genus: †Miodelphinus; Tanaka, 2024
- Species: †M. miensis

Binomial name
- †Miodelphinus miensis Tanaka, 2024

= Miodelphinus =

Miodelphinus Temporal range: Miocene, 18.7–18.5 Ma

Miodelphinus is an extinct genus of platanistoid dolphin that lived during the Miocene epoch, about 18.7–18.5 million years ago. Its fossil, which was found in 1991 at Haze Formation (Japan) and described as a new genus in 2024, consists of a portion of its skull, hyoid bones, and ribs. The preserved part of the skull is 30 cm long with 4 cm long ear bones. The periotic of Miodelphinus shows a large, posteriorly widened, ventrally opening, funnel-like articular depression between the posterior and articular processes of the periotic. Based on the morphology and phylogenic studies, Miodelphinus is classified as a member of squalodelphinids. And differ compared to living platanistoids that lived in the river; squalodelphinids are marine mammals and their closes living relatives are the two species of South Asian River Dolphins.
