= Chilcatay Formation =

Geologic formation in Peru

- Stratigraphic range: Early Miocene (Burdigalian); ~19.2–18.0 Ma
- Type: Geological formation
- Unit of: Pisco Basin
- Underlies: Pisco Formation
- Overlies: Otuma Formation

Lithology
- Primary: Sandstone, siltstone

Location
- Country: Peru

The Chilcatay Formation is a geologic formation located in Peru. The formation was deposited in the Pisco Basin, during the Early Miocene, roughly from 19.2 to 18.0 Ma. Fossil remains of baleen whales, sharks, and rays have been found in the formation.

== Paleobiota of the Chilcatay Formation ==
=== Mammals ===
==== Dolphins ====
Taxa	Species	Material	Description	Images	Notes
Huaridelphis	H. raimondii		A squalodelphinid river dolphin		
Ensidelphis	E. riveroi		A river dolphin		
Furcacetus	F. flexirostrum		A river dolphin		
Incacetus	I. broggii		A kentriodontid dolphin		
cf. Kentriodon	cf. K. sp.		A kentriodontid dolphin		
Macrosqualodelphis	M. ukupachai		A squalodelphinid river dolphin		
Notocetus	N. vanbenedeni		A squalodelphinid river dolphin		
Squalodelphinidae	Gen. et. sp. indet.		A river dolphin		

==== Whales ====
Taxa	Species	Material	Description	Images	Notes
Amphidelphis	A. bakersfieldensis	A cranium			
Cetotheriidae	Gen. et. sp. indet.				
Chaeomysticeti	Gen. et. sp. indet.	A partial skull (CTZ 02)	A baleen whale; either a late-diverging stem mysticete or an early-branching crown mysticete		
Chaeomysticeti	Gen. et. sp. indet.	A badly damaged dentary (ZM 98)	A baleen whale; crownward of Eomysticetidae		
Chaeomysticeti	Gen. et. sp. indet.	A skull (ZM 152)	A crown-group baleen whale, possibly a basal plicogulan		
Chilcacetus	C. cavirhinus		A toothed whale		
Chilcacetus	C. ullujayensis		A toothed whale		
Diaphorocetus	D. otergai		A physeteroid sperm whale		
Eurhinodelphinidae	Gen. et. sp. indet.		A toothed whale		
Inticetus	I. vertizi		A toothed whale		
Mysticeti	Gen. et. sp. indet.		A baleen whale		
Odontoceti	Gen. et. sp. indet.		A toothed whale		
Rhaphicetus	R. valenciae		A physeteroid sperm whale		

==== Seals ====
Taxa	Species	Material	Description	Images	Notes
Pinnipedia	Gen. et. sp. indet.		A seal		

=== Birds ===
==== Penguins ====
Taxa	Species	Material	Description	Images	Notes
Palaeospheniscus	P. sp.		An early penguin		

=== Reptiles ===
==== Turtles ====
Taxa	Species	Material	Description	Images	Notes
Testudines	Gen. et. sp. indet.		A turtle		

==== Crocodilians ====
Taxa	Species	Material	Description	Images	Notes
Sacacosuchus	S. cordovai		A gavialid crocodilian		

=== Cartilaginous fish ===
==== Rays ====
Taxa	Species	Material	Description	Images	Notes
cf. Anoxypristis	cf. A. sp.	A rostral spine	A sawfish		
Dasyatidae	Gen. et. sp. indet.	Dermal denticles	A whiptail stingray		
Myliobatoidea	Gen. et. sp. indet.	Teeth	A stingray; several of the teeth compare favorably with Myliobatis eagle rays		

==== Sharks ====
Taxa	Species	Material	Description	Images	Notes
Alopias	A. superciliosus	Teeth	The bigeye thresher		
Alopias	A. cf. vulpinus	Teeth	Tentatively assigned to the common thresher		
Anotodus	A. agassizii	Teeth	A thresher shark		
Carcharhinus	C. brachyurus	Teeth	The copper shark		
Carcharhinus	C. dicelmai				
Carcharhinus	C. cf. leucas	A tooth	Tentatively assigned to the bull shark		
Carcharias	C. sp.	Teeth	A sand tiger shark		
Carcharodon	C. subauriculatus		Junior synonym of C. chubutensis and C. megalodon.		
Cosmopolitodus	C. hastalis	Teeth	White sharks		
Cosmopolitodus	C. plicatilis	Teeth	White sharks		
Galeocerdo	G. aduncus	Teeth	A tiger shark		
Hemipristis	H. serra	Teeth	A weasel shark		
Isurus	I. oxyrinchus	Teeth	The shortfin mako shark		
Megalolamna	M. paradoxodon	A tooth	A megatoothed shark		
Megachasma	M. cf. applegatei	Teeth	A megamouth shark		
Negaprion	N. brevirostris	Teeth	The lemon shark		
Otodus	O. chubutensis	Teeth	A megatoothed shark; sometimes placed in separate genus Carcharocles		
Parotodus	P. benedenii	Teeth	A possible megatoothed shark		
Physogaleus	P. contortus	Teeth	A ground shark		
Sphyrna	S. zygaena	Teeth	The smooth hammerhead		
Squatina	S. sp.	Teeth	An angel shark		
