= Pebas Formation =

Geological formation in Brazil, Colombia, Ecuador and Peru

- Stratigraphic range: Early Aquitanian-Tortonian (Colhuehuapian-Huayquerian); ~21–8 Ma
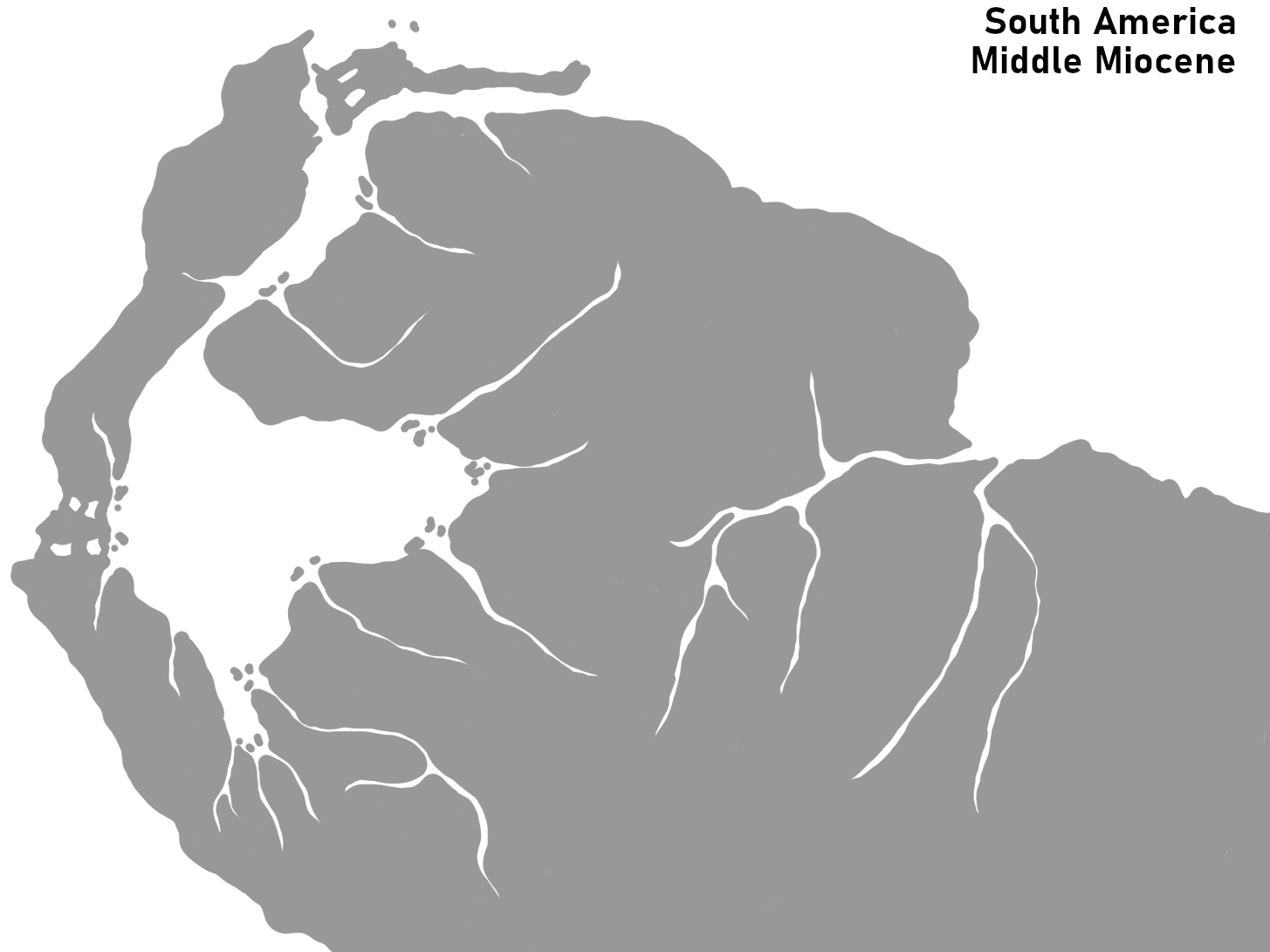
- The Pebas Mega-Wetland (or Lake Pebas), on the western side of this map, corresponds to the Pebas Formation
- Underlies: Marañón Formation
- Overlies: Chambira Formation
- Area: 1,000,000 km^{2} (390,000 sq mi)
- Thickness: ~350–1,074 m (1,148–3,524 ft)

Lithology
- Primary: Siltstone, mudstone
- Other: Coal/lignite

Location
- Coordinates: 7.4°S 75.0°W
- Approximate paleocoordinates: 8.4°S 70.6°W
- Region: Amazon Basin
- Country: Brazil; Colombia; Ecuador; Peru

Type section
- Named for: Pebas District

The Pebas Formation is a lithostratigraphic unit of Miocene age, found in western Amazonia. The formation extends over 1,000,000 square kilometres (390,000 sq mi), including parts of Brazil, Peru, Ecuador and Colombia. It is interpreted as representing the deposits of a lake ("Lake Pebas") or series of lakes, formed within the foreland basin of the Andes mountain belt. It is known for its abundant fossil ostracods and molluscs and an unusually diverse group of crocodylians.

== Fossil content ==
=== Fish ===
Taxa	Species	Locality	Stratigraphic position	Material	Notes	Images
Anostomidae	Indeterminate					
Hydrolycus	cf. H. sp.					
Leporinus	L. sp.					
Pristis	P. sp.					
Potamotrygon	P. sp.					

=== Insects ===
Taxa	Species	Locality	Stratigraphic position	Material	Notes	Images
Macroteleia	M. yaguarum				A parasitoid wasp.	
Sycorax	S. peruensis				Relatives of moth flies and sand flies.	

=== Mammals ===
Taxa	Species	Locality	Stratigraphic position	Material	Notes	Images
Dinomyidae	indeterminate				A hystricognath rodent.	
Octodontoidea	Indeterminate.				A hystricognath rodent.	
Neoepiblema	N. sp.				A hystricognath rodent.	
Pebanista	P. yacuruna	Rio Napo.		A nearly complete skull.	A platanistid river dolphin.	
Pseudoprepotherium	P. sp.	Rio Napo			A ground sloth.	
Potamarchus	P. sp				A hystricognath rodent.	
Parapropalaehoplophorus	P. sp				a glyptodont	

=== Reptiles ===
Taxa	Species	Locality	Stratigraphic position	Material	Notes	Images
Caiman	C. wannlangstoni	Locality IQ26 and IQ114		A well-preserved partial skull.	An extinct caiman	
Gavialoidea	Indeterminate.					
Gnatusuchus	G. pebasensis	Locality IQ114, IQ116, and IQ125	Upper	A nearly complete skull.	A clam eating caiman.	
Gryposuchus	G. pachakamue	Locality IQ101			A gavialid crocodilian.	
Kuttanacaiman	K. iquitosensis	Locality IQ26 and IQ116	Middle	nearly complete skull and mandibles.	A small caiman.	
Chelus	C. colombianus			Pieces of shell bones and scutes	A slightly larger species of mata mata, reaching an estimated shell length of up to a meter.	
Mourasuchus	M. atopus	Locality IQ114				
Paleosuchus	P. sp.					
Podocnemis	P. sp.					
Purussaurus	P. neivensis	Locality IQ26 and IQ114		Skull and teeth.	A giant caiman.	

== Correlations ==
=== Laventan ===
Laventan correlations in South America
Formation	Honda	Honda	Aisol	Cura-Mallín	Pisco	Ipururo	Pebas	Capadare	Urumaco	Inés	Paraná	Map
Basin	VSM	Honda	San Rafael	Caldera	Pisco	Ucayali	Amazon	Falcón		Venezuela	Paraná	Pebas Formation (South America)
Country	Colombia	Bolivia	Argentina	Chile	Peru			Venezuela			Argentina	Pebas Formation (South America)
Boreostemma												Pebas Formation (South America)
Hapalops												Pebas Formation (South America)
Miocochilius												Pebas Formation (South America)
Theosodon												Pebas Formation (South America)
Xenastrapotherium												Pebas Formation (South America)
Mylodontidae												Pebas Formation (South America)
Sparassodonta												Pebas Formation (South America)
Primates												Pebas Formation (South America)
Rodents												Pebas Formation (South America)
Birds												Pebas Formation (South America)
Terror birds												Pebas Formation (South America)
Reptiles												Pebas Formation (South America)
megalodon												Pebas Formation (South America)
Flora												Pebas Formation (South America)
Insects												Pebas Formation (South America)
Environments	Fluvial			Fluvio-deltaic		Fluvio-lacustrine		Fluvio-deltaic			Fluvial	Laventan volcanoclastics Laventan fauna Laventan flora
Volcanic	Yes											Laventan volcanoclastics Laventan fauna Laventan flora

=== Huayquerian ===
Huayquerian correlations in South America
Formation	Cerro Azul	Ituzaingó	Paraná	Camacho	Raigón	Andalhuala	Chiquimil	Las Flores	Maimará	Palo	Pebas	Muyu	Rosa	Saldungaray	Salicas	Urumaco	Map
Basin	Colorado	Paraná				Hualfín		Tontal	Andes	Salta	Amazon	Huasi	Altiplano	BA	Velasco	Falcón	Pebas Formation (South America)
Country	Argentina			Uruguay		Argentina					Brazil Peru	Bolivia		Argentina		Venezuela	Pebas Formation (South America)
Cardiatherium																	Pebas Formation (South America)
Lagostomus																	Pebas Formation (South America)
Macroeuphractus																	Pebas Formation (South America)
Proeuphractus																	Pebas Formation (South America)
Pronothrotherium																	Pebas Formation (South America)
Pseudotypotherium																	Pebas Formation (South America)
Thylacosmilus																	Pebas Formation (South America)
Xotodon																	Pebas Formation (South America)
Macraucheniidae																	Pebas Formation (South America)
Primates																	Pebas Formation (South America)
Rodents																	Pebas Formation (South America)
Reptiles																	Pebas Formation (South America)
Birds																	Pebas Formation (South America)
Terror birds																	Pebas Formation (South America)
Flora																	Pebas Formation (South America)
Environments	Aeolian-fluvial	Fluvio-deltaic			Fluvial						Fluvio-lacustrine	Fluvial			Fluvio-lacustrine	Fluvio-deltaic	Huayquerian volcanoclastics Huayquerian fauna Huayquerian flora
Volcanic						Yes											Huayquerian volcanoclastics Huayquerian fauna Huayquerian flora
