= Carcharhinus dicelmai =

Carcharhinus dicelmai Temporal range: Burdigalian

Scientific classification
- Kingdom: Animalia
- Phylum: Chordata
- Class: Chondrichthyes
- Subclass: Elasmobranchii
- Division: Selachii
- Order: Carcharhiniformes
- Family: Carcharhinidae
- Genus: Carcharhinus
- Species: †C. dicelmai

Binomial name
- †Carcharhinus dicelmai Collareta et al., 2022

Extinct species of shark

Carcharhinus dicelmai is an extinct species of carcharhinid chondrichthyan in the genus Carcharhinus that lived during the Burdigalian stage of the Miocene epoch.

== Distribution ==
Carcharhinus dicelmai is known from the Chilcatay Formation of Peru.
