= Prepomatodelphis =

Prepomatodelphis Temporal range: Early Miocene

Scientific classification
- Domain: Eukaryota
- Kingdom: Animalia
- Phylum: Chordata
- Class: Mammalia
- Order: Artiodactyla
- Infraorder: Cetacea
- Family: Platanistidae
- Genus: †Prepomatodelphis; Barnes, 2002
- Species: †P. korneuburgensis

Binomial name
- †Prepomatodelphis korneuburgensis Barnes, 2002

Extinct genus of dolphins

Prepomatodelphis is an extinct genus of river dolphin from Early Miocene marine deposits in Austria.

== Classification ==
Prepomatodelphis belongs to the platanistid subfamily Pomatodelphininae, which is distinguished from the South Asian river dolphin in having a flattened rostrum, a transversely expanded posterior end of the premaxilla, an eye and bony orbit of normal size (not atrophied), and nasal bones not reduced in size but wide transversely. Features distinguishing Prepomatodelphis from Pomatodelphis include smaller size, cranium with surface of the premaxillary sac fossa undulating, having in its midpart a sulcus bounded both medially and laterally by a ridge, and sloping ventrally at both its medial and lateral margins, and zygomatic process of squamosal very deep dorsoventrally in the posterior part.
