= Indus Dolphin Reserve =

Ramsar site in Sindh, Pakistan

Coordinates: 28°01′N 69°15′E

Designations

Ramsar Wetland
- Designated: 10 May 2001
- Reference no.: 1065

Indus Dolphin Reserve is a Ramsar site located between Guddu Barrage and Sukkur Barrage on River Indus in Pakistan. Stretched on an area of 125,000 hectares, it was designated as a wetland protected site on 10 May 2001. In 1974 it was declared a protected site locally on the recommendation of World Wide Fund for Nature. According to a survey conducted in 1989, there are about 429 Indus river dolphin present.
