= Pisco Basin =

Peruvian sedimentary basin

- Cuenca de Pisco
- Location within Peru
- Coordinates: 14°15′S 76°0′W
- Etymology: City of Pisco, Peru
- Location: Western South America
- Country: Peru
- State: Ica Region
- Cities: Pisco

Characteristics
- On/Offshore: Both
- Part of: Circum-Pacific forearc basins
- Area: 300 km (190 mi)

Hydrology
- Sea: Eastern Pacific Ocean
- River: Pisco River

Geology
- Basin type: Forearc basin
- Orogeny: Andean
- Age: Eocene–Pliocene
- Stratigraphy: Stratigraphy

Pisco Basin (Spanish: Cuenca de Pisco) is a sedimentary basin extending over 300 kilometres (190 mi) in southwestern Peru. The basin has a 2-kilometre (1.25-mile) thick sedimentary fill, which is about half the thickness of more northern foreland basins in Peru.

The oldest known sediments are the Eocene sandstones of the Caballas Formation, while the youngest deposits, the fossiliferous Pisco Formation, date to the Early Pleistocene. (Note: later publications give a younger top date) In relation to present-day, topography the fill of Pisco Basin makes the upper part of the Coastal Cordillera of southern Peru, the coastal plains, the Ica-Nazca Depression and the Andean foothills.

The basin is renowned for hosting various highly fossiliferous stratigraphic units; the Pisco Formation has provided a wealth of marine mammals (including sloths), birds, fish and other groups, as have the Chilcatay, Otuma and Paracas Formations.

== Stratigraphy ==
Stratigraphy of Pisco Basin (Note: Based on "DeVries (1998) as presented by León et al. (2007)")
Age	SALMA (Note: See SALMA Bibliography for sources)	Units		Environment	Lithology
Pleistocene	Uquian	Pisco		Lagoonal to near-shore	Bioclastic conglomerate, sandstone
Middle Miocene	Colloncuran	Pisco		Lagoonal to near-shore	Bioclastic conglomerate, sandstone
Early Miocene	Colhuehuapian	Chilcatay		Marine	Siltstone, sandstone
Late Oligocene	Deseadan	Chilcatay		Marine	Siltstone, sandstone
Early Oligocene; Late Eocene	Tinguirirican; Divisaderan	Otuma		Marine embayment	Bioclastic sandstone, sandstone, silty sandstone, mudstone, dolomitic sediment
Late Eocene	Divisaderan	Paracas	Yumaque		Mudrock, phosphatic shale, diatomite, porcellanite, chert
Late Eocene	Mustersan	Paracas	Los Choros	Inner shelf, shoreface, intertidal	Bioclastic conglomerate, sandstone, siltstone, mudrock
Eocene	Casamayoran	Caballas		Fluvial	Sandstone, tuff, coal

== Tectonic and sedimentary evolution ==
The basin developed in a setting of extensional tectonics from Eocene to the Late Miocene with short-lived episode of basin inversion in the Middle Miocene. Late Pliocene and Pleistocene uplift of the basin may be consequence of the subduction of Nazca Ridge.

Sedimentary strata of the basin shows evidence for a series of marine transgressions during the last 50 million years. These marine transgressions occurred in a sequence 41-34 Ma, 31-28 Ma, 25-16 Ma, 15-11 Ma, 10-5 Ma, and 4-2 Ma. The end of most of the marine transgressions is thought to be associated either with global sea level falls or compressional events in the Andes.

=== Oligo-Miocene transgression ===
The marine Oligo-Miocene (25–16 Ma) marine transgression is evidenced by a series of sedimentary strata containing fossils of marine diatoms, Peruchilus snails and Pitar and Cucullaea clams. Oligo-Miocene marine environments in the Pisco Basin range from littoral to shelf. Moquegua Basin southeast of Pisco Basin appear to have been unaffected by the transgression.

Within the Andean margin contemporary marine transgressions are also known from southern Chile, Patagonia and Colombia. As such the marine transgression is thought to represent a regional phenomenon with the steadily rising central Andes being an exception.

== Paleontology ==
=== Chilcatay Formation ===
Group	Fossils	Notes
Mammals	Chilcacetus cavirhinus, Huaridelphis raimondii, Incacetus broggii, Inticetus vertizi, Macrosqualodelphis ukupachai, Notocetus vanbenedeni, cf. Kentriodon sp., Cetotheriidae indet., Eurhinodelphinidae indet., Mysticeti indet., Odontoceti indet., Pinnipedia indet., Physeteroidea indet., Squalodelphinidae indet.	
Birds	Palaeospheniscus sp.	
Reptiles	Testudines indet.	
Fish	Carcharhinus cf. brachurus, Carcharodon hastalis, Carcharodon subauriculatus, Hemipristis cf. serra, Isurus desori	

=== Otuma Formation ===
Group	Fossils	Notes
Mammals	Cynthiacetus peruvianus, Basilosauridae indet.	
Birds	Icadyptes salasi, Inkayacu paracasensis, Spheniscidae indet.	
Fish	Engraulis sp., Sardinops sp.	

=== Paracas Formation ===
Group	Fossils	Notes
Mammals	Ocucajea picklingi, Supayacetus muizoni, Basilosauridae indet., Mystacodon selenensis, Peregocetus pacificus, Perucetus colossus	
Birds	Perudyptes devriesi	
Fish	Pristis sp., Myliobatis sp., Clupeiformes sp.	

== See also ==
- Arauco Basin, Chile
- Altiplano Basin, Peru, Chile, Bolivia
- Caldera Basin, Chile
- Cocinetas Basin, Colombia
- Urumaco Formation, Venezuela

== Notes and references ==
=== Bibliography ===
Stratigraphy

- DeVries, Thomas J.; Urbina, Mario; Jud, Nathan A. (2017), "The Eocene-Oligocene Otuma Depositional Sequence (East Pisco Basin, Peru): Paleogeographic and Paleoceanographic Implications of New Data" (PDF), Boletín de la Sociedad Geológica del Perú, 112: 014–038
- Dunbar, Robert B.; Marty, Richard C.; Baker, Paul A. (1990), "Cenozoic marine sedimentation in the Sechura and Pisco basins, Peru", Palaeogeography, Palaeoclimatology, Palaeoecology, 77 (3–4): 235–261, Bibcode:1990PPP....77..235D, doi:10.1016/0031-0182(90)90179-B

==== Geology publications ====
- León, Walter; Aleman, Antenor; Rosell, Walter; Torres, Víctor; de la Cruz, Orlando (2007), Estratigrafía, sedimentología y evolucón tectónica de la cuenca Pisco Oriental (in Spanish), vol. 27, Estudios Regionales, Serie D, p. 1
- Devries, T.J. (1998), "Oligocene deposition and Cenozoic sequence boundaries in the Pisco Basin (Peru)", Journal of South American Earth Sciences, 11 (3): 217–231, Bibcode:1998JSAES..11..217D, doi:10.1016/S0895-9811(98)00014-5
- Macharé, José; Devries, Thomas; Barron, John; Fourtanier, Élisabeth (1988), "Oligo-Miocene transgression along the Pacifie margin of South America: new paleontological and geological evidence from the Pisco basin (Peru)" (PDF), Geódynamique, 3 (1–2): 25–37

==== Paleontology publications ====
- Solís Mundaca, Flavio Alejandro (2018), Bioestratigrafía e implicancias paleoceanográficas de las diatomeas de la sección Cerro Caucato, Formación Pisco, Ica, Peru (MSc. thesis) (PDF), Universidad Peruana Cayetano Heredia, pp. 1–158
- Lambert, O.; Martínez Cáceres, M.; Bianucci, G.; Di Celma, C.; Salas Gismondi, R.; Steurbaut, E.; Urbina, Mario; de Muizon, C. (2017), "Earliest Mysticete from the Late Eocene of Peru Sheds New Light on the Origin of Baleen Whales", Current Biology, 27 (10): 1–7, Bibcode:2017CBio...27E1535L, doi:10.1016/j.cub.2017.04.026, hdl:11581/396095, PMID 28502655
