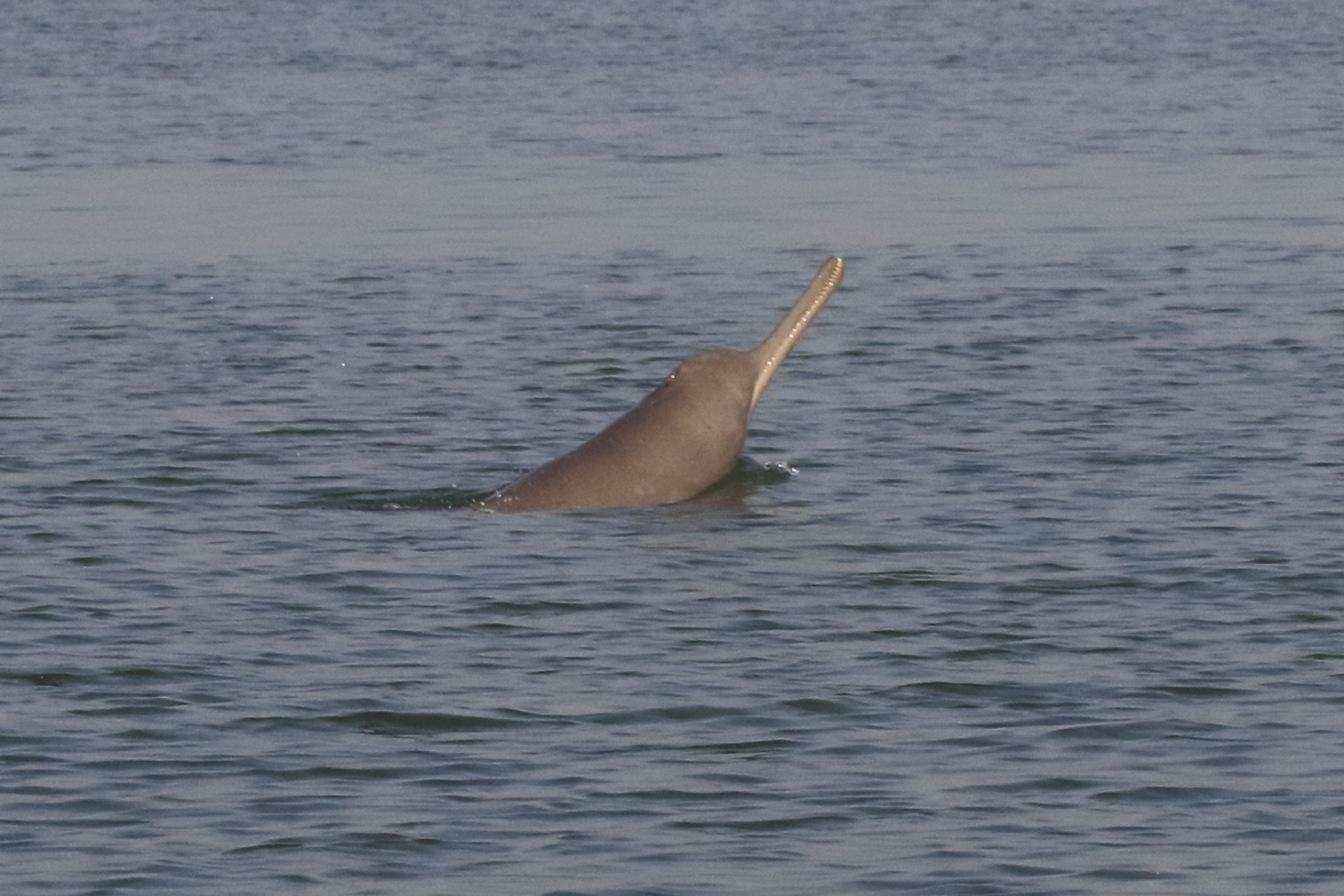
- Indus river dolphin (Platanista minor)

Scientific classification
- Kingdom: Animalia
- Phylum: Chordata
- Class: Mammalia
- Infraclass: Placentalia
- Order: Artiodactyla
- Infraorder: Cetacea
- Parvorder: Odontoceti
- Superfamily: Platanistoidea
- Family: Platanistidae; J. E. Gray, 1846

Genera
- Platanista; †Araeodelphis; †Dilophodelphis; †Grimadelphis; †Pachyacanthus; †Pebanista; †Pomatodelphis; †Prepomatodelphis; †Zarhachis

= Platanistidae =

Platanistidae Temporal range: Early Miocene to Recent

Family of dolphins

Platanistidae is a family of river dolphins containing the extant Ganges river dolphin and Indus river dolphin (both in the genus Platanista) but also extinct relatives from freshwater and marine deposits in the Neogene.

The Amazon river dolphin, baiji, and La Plata dolphin were once thought to belong to Platanistidae (e.g. Simpson, 1945), but cladistic and DNA studies beginning in the 1990s showed that the former three taxa are more closely related to Delphinoidea than to the South Asian river dolphin. The extinct odontocete families Allodelphinidae and Squalodelphinidae are closely related to Platanistidae. Fossils from this clade have been found in deposits in North and South America, Europe, and Central Asia.

Fossil and modern members of Platanistidae, a family of dolphins, share distinctive features such as an elongated, narrow snout and a uniquely shaped bone near the cheek area. The family is divided into two subfamilies: the extinct Pomatodelphininae, known from Miocene marine deposits, and the extant Platanistinae, which includes the South Asian river dolphin Platanista gangetica.
