= Squalodelphinidae =

Squalodelphinidae Temporal range: ?late Chattian-Langhian, 23–11.6 Ma

Scientific classification
- Kingdom: Animalia
- Phylum: Chordata
- Class: Mammalia
- Infraclass: Placentalia
- Order: Artiodactyla
- Infraorder: Cetacea
- Superfamily: Platanistoidea
- Family: †Squalodelphinidae; Dal Piaz, 1917

Genera
- Fordycetus; Furcacetus; Huaridelphis; Macrosqualodelphis; Medocinia; Notocetus; Phocageneus; Squalodelphis; Miodelphinus

Extinct family of mammals

Squalodelphinidae is a family of primitive platanistoid river dolphins, found in marine deposits in the eastern Pacific, western Atlantic, and Europe.

== Description ==
Distinguishing features of Squalodelphinidae include a moderately elongated and tapered rostrum, posterior cheek teeth being single-rooted but retaining accessory denticles, and marked skull asymmetry. Members of the family can be differentiated from the South Asian river dolphin by their shorter rostrum.
