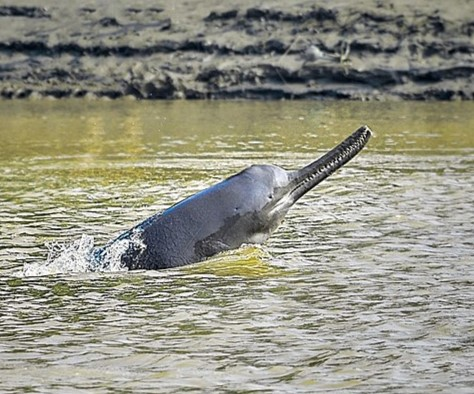
- Ganges river dolphin breaking the surface

Scientific classification
- Kingdom: Animalia
- Phylum: Chordata
- Class: Mammalia
- Infraclass: Placentalia
- Order: Artiodactyla
- Infraorder: Cetacea
- Family: Platanistidae
- Genus: Platanista; Wagler, 1830

Type species
- Delphinus gangeticus Lebeck, 1801

Species
- Platanista gangetica Platanista minor
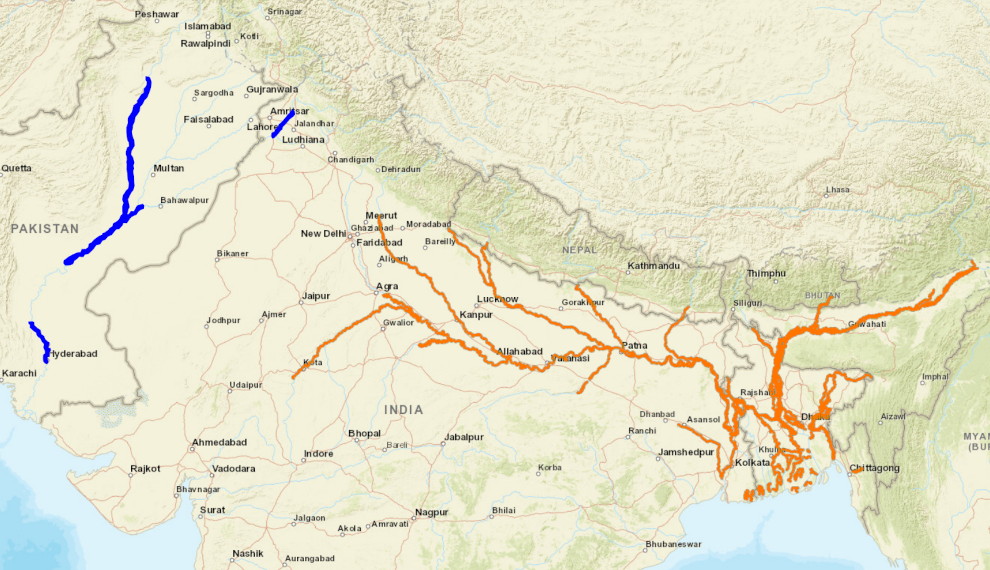
- Current ranges of the Indus river dolphin and Ganges river dolphin

= South Asian river dolphin =

South Asian river dolphin Temporal range: 0.012–0 Ma Quaternary – recent

Genus of freshwater dolphin

South Asian river dolphins are toothed whales in the genus Platanista, which inhabit the waterways of the Indian subcontinent. They were historically considered to be one species (P. gangetica) with the Ganges river dolphin and the Indus river dolphin being subspecies (P. g. gangetica and P. g. minor respectively). Genetic and morphological evidence led to their being described as separate species in 2021. The Ganges and Indus river dolphins are estimated to have diverged 550,000 years ago. They are the only living members of the family Platanistidae and the superfamily Platanistoidea. Fossils of ancient relatives date to the late Oligocene.

South Asian river dolphins are small but stocky cetaceans with long snouts or rostra, broad flippers, and small dorsal fins. They have several unusual features. Living in murky river waters, they have eyes that are tiny and lensless; the dolphins rely instead on echolocation for navigation. The skull has large crests over the melon, which help direct their echolocation signals. These dolphins prey mainly on fish and shrimp and hunt them throughout the water column. They are active through the day and are sighted in small groups. Both species are listed as endangered by the IUCN Red List of mammals. Major threats include dams, barrages, fishing nets, and both chemical and acoustic pollution.

== Taxonomy ==
South Asian river dolphins were traditionally considered to be one species, Platanista gangetica, with the Ganges and Indus River populations being subspecies (P. g. gangetica and P. g. minor, respectively). Heinrich Julius Lebeck named the Ganges river dolphin Delphinus gangeticus in 1801, while Johann Georg Wagler coined the genus name Platanista in 1830, a Latin word derived from the Greek "platanistēs", which may be related to the Greek words platē ("oar") or platē ("flat, broad"). This name was first given to the Ganges dolphin by Pliny the Elder in Naturalis Historia back in 77 CE. In 1853, Richard Owen described a specimen from the Indus and considered it to be the same species as the Ganges river dolphin, but a smaller form.

Based on differences in skull and vertebrae structure, blood proteins, and lipids, scientists declared them to be separate species in the 1970s. The results of these studies were criticized for their small sample sizes and the absence of statistical analyses; by the late 1990s, the two populations were again considered to be two subspecies of a single species. A 2014 mitochondrial DNA study found insufficient differences to support their classification as separate species. However, a 2021 study reanalyzed the two populations and found significant genetic divergence and major differences in skull structure; this led to the conclusion that the two were indeed distinct species.

=== Evolution ===
South Asian river dolphins are the only surviving members of the family Platanistidae and the superfamily Platanistoidea. They are not closely related to river dolphins of the families Lipotidae, Pontoporiidae, and Iniidae, which all independently adapted to freshwater habitats. The following cladogram is based on Gatesy and colleagues (2012) and McGowen and colleagues (2020), and shows the relationship of South Asian river dolphins to other living toothed whale families:

- Toothed whales
  - - Sperm whales (Physeteridae)
    - Dwarf sperm whales (Kogiidae)
  - - South Asian river dolphins (Platanistidae)
    - - Beaked whales (Ziphiidae)
      - - South American river dolphins
          - Pontoporiidae
          - Iniidae
        - Delphinoidea
          - Oceanic dolphins (Delphinidae)
          - - Porpoises (Phocoenidae)
            - Belugas, narwhals (Monodontidae)

Several fossil species have been classified under Platanistoidea, the earliest of which date back to the late Oligocene (c. 25 million years ago). The number of species peaked around the early Miocene (c. 19 million years ago) and declined afterward. Examples of ancient platanistids include the genera Otekaikea and Waipatia and the species Awamokoa tokarahi of late Oligocene New Zealand, the family Allodelphinidae of early Miocene North Pacific, and Notocetus vanbenedeni and Aondelphis talen of early Miocene Patagonia. Platanistidae fossils have been found in Miocene deposits in Europe and North America. Fossil Platanistoidea showed a diversity of cochlea shapes, though Platanista was unusual in that it developed flatter spirals with larger gaps between them.

During the middle Miocene, the ancestor of Platanista entered the Indo-Gangetic Plain, then covered by inland seas, and remained there when sea levels dropped in the late Neogene and its environment converted to freshwater. River dolphins likely traveled from the Ganges River basin to the Indus via stream capture within the last five million years. The split between the two species is estimated to have occurred around 550,000 years ago based on mitochondrial DNA.

== Description ==
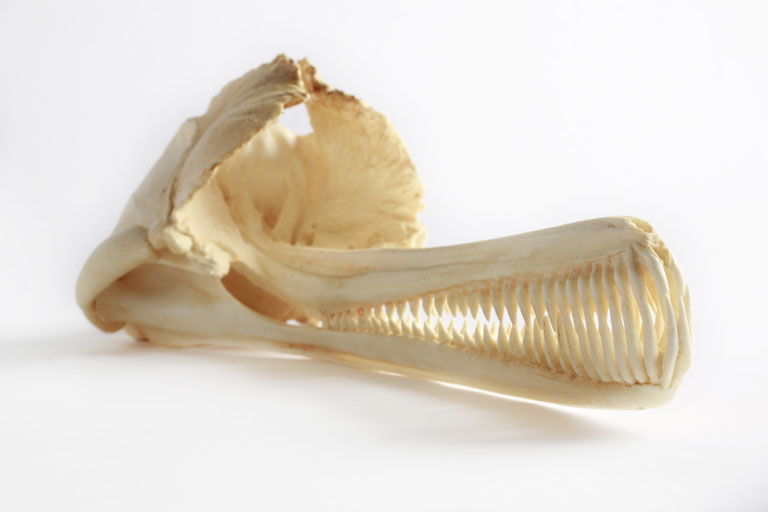
Full body (top) and skull of Indus river dolphin

South Asian river dolphins are stocky with broad, squared-off pectoral fins; elongated, slender rostrums (snouts); and tiny triangular dorsal fins. Their neck joints give them great flexibility. Unusual among cetaceans, the blowhole is slit-shaped. The finger bones can also be seen through the flippers. South Asian river dolphins possess some features that are "primitive" for a cetacean, such as a cecum connected to the gut and air sacs near the blowhole. The testes of the males are located closer to the underside than in marine dolphins and descend more. Their skin ranges from grey to greyish-brown in colour, though the rostrum and surrounding areas may have some pinkish colouration. The Indus species tends to be more brownish.

In one study sampling 46 Ganges river dolphins, the maximum length and weight recorded were 267 cm (8.76 ft) and 108 kg (238 lb). For the Indus species, the maximum length and weight were 241 cm (7.91 ft) and 120 kg (260 lb) (80 individuals sampled). Female Ganges dolphins are generally longer than Indus dolphins of both sexes, while male Ganges dolphins are shorter than Indus dolphins of both sexes. Indus dolphins tend to be proportionally heavier than Ganges dolphins, independent of sex.

South Asian river dolphin skulls have unusual features. The maxilla (fixed upper jawbone) has pneumatic extensions or "crests" on each side which curve around the melon and protrude forward over the rostrum. These likely help them focus their echolocation signals in their riverine environment. The Ganges species also has a protrusion near the frontal suture, which distinguishes it from the Indus species. The teeth of South Asian river dolphins are curved and longer in the front, where they remain exposed when the jaws are closed. Indus dolphins have more teeth than Ganges dolphins, averaging 33.2 teeth in the upper jaw and the 32.9 in the lower jaw, as compared to 28.4 in the upper jaw and 29.4 in the lower.

Living in murky waters, South Asian river dolphins are nearly blind, their tiny eyes having flattened corneas and no lens. The retina—which connects to a reduced optic nerve—does not form images but instead merely discerns light. The animal relies on a sphincter-like muscle around the eye to control access to the retina and prevent light scattering, similar to a pinhole. The ears are adapted to hearing low frequencies, having a short, flattened cochlea with widely spaced spirals.

== Distribution and habitat ==
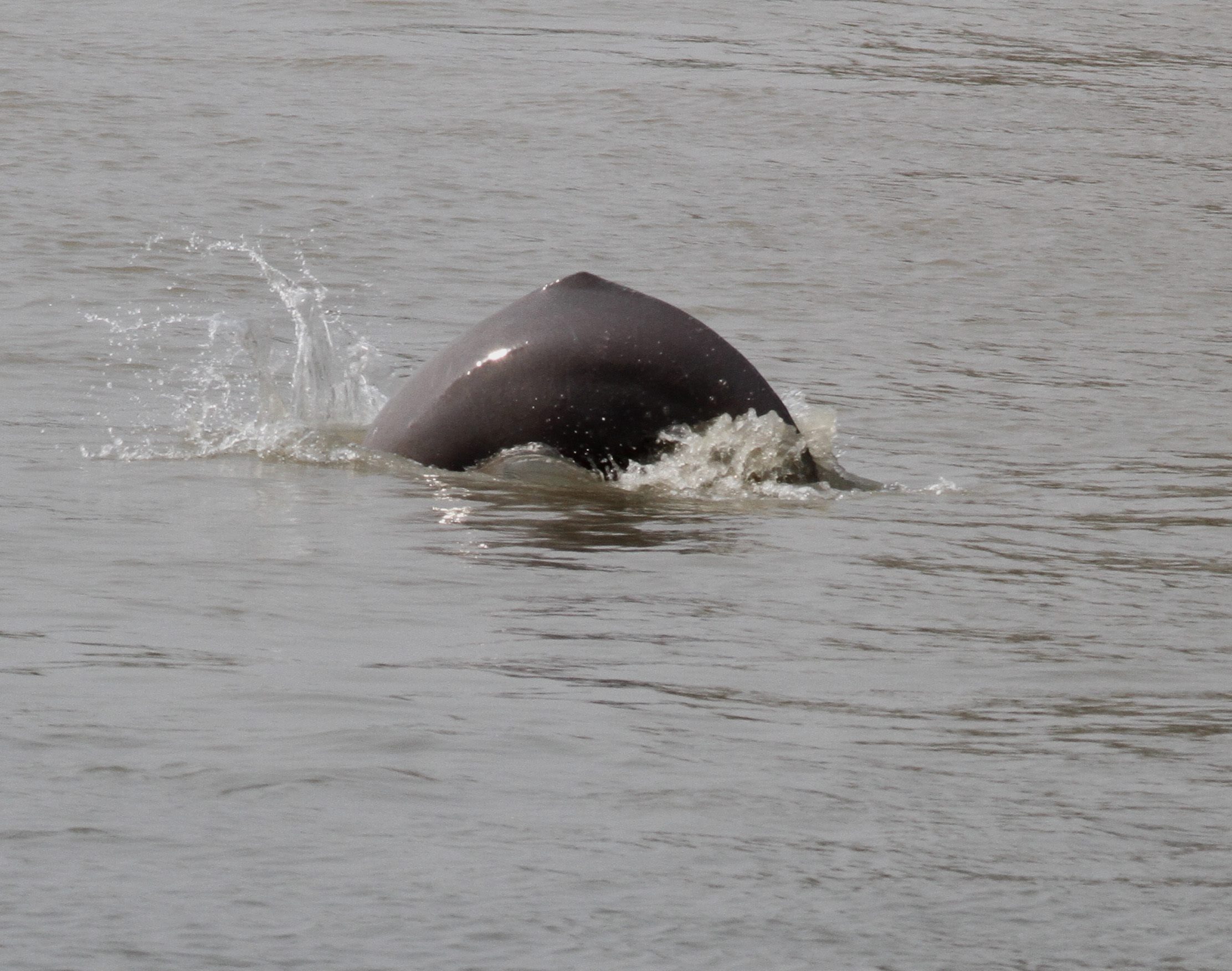
Ganges river dolphin in the Sundarbans, Bangladesh

South Asian river dolphins inhabit the northern waterways of the Indian subcontinent. Ganges river dolphins live in the Ganges, Brahmaputra, Meghna, Karnaphuli, and Sangu rivers and their tributaries. Their range extends from the Himalayan foothills to the Ganges Delta, across the countries of Nepal, India and Bangladesh. It is unknown if they are present in Bhutan. Outflows of freshwater into the Bay of Bengal have allowed them to swim along the coast, and there is at least one record of an individual entering the Budhabalanga River, around 300 km (190 mi) southwest of the Ganges Delta. This species has maintained much of its range since the 19th century but has disappeared from some northern and western rivers and waterways.

The Indus river dolphin mainly lives in the Indus River of Pakistan, with three subpopulations between the Chashma, Taunsa, Guddu, and Sukkur barrages. Two other populations exist south of Sukkur and in the Beas River of India. In the 19th century, this species was reported to have occurred throughout the Indus River system, from the Indus River Delta north to Kalabagh just south of the Himalayas, including all the main tributaries. The Indus river dolphin is reported to have disappeared between the Jinnah and Chashma barrages after 2001.

South Asian river dolphins inhabit major river channels during the dry season and travel to smaller tributaries for the monsoon. They are most commonly found in stream pools, meanders, and confluences, and around river islands and shoals, which produce relatively stable waters. They can be found in pools over 30 m (98 ft) deep, but usually dwell in shallower water.

== Behaviour and life history ==
South Asian river dolphins appear to be active throughout the day. Living in flowing waters, they swim almost constantly with only brief periods of sleep, which add up to seven hours per day. They swim on their sides when in shallow water. River dolphins generally surface with the rostrum, head, and dorsal fin breaking the water and rarely breach or raise the tail fluke, though surface activity can vary based on age, distance from shore and time of day. Diving may last as long as eight minutes among adults and subadults; dives of newborns and juveniles are not as long.

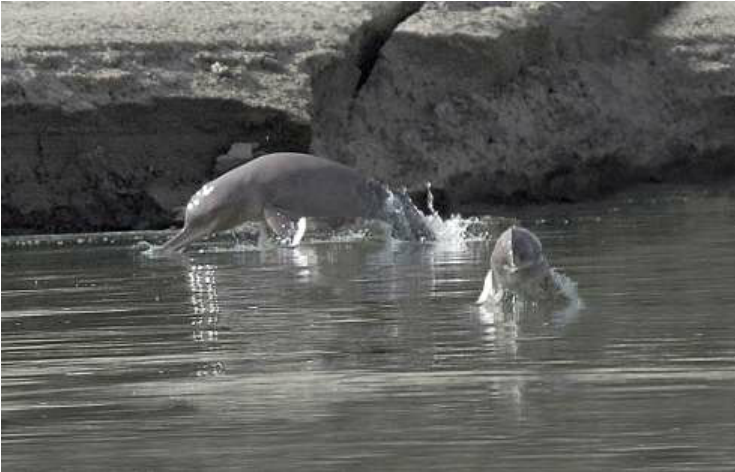
Indus river dolphins leaping

River dolphins are typically seen alone or in groups of up to 10 individuals, though enough natural resources may attract up to 30 dolphins. Individuals do not appear to have strong social bonds, outside of mothers and calves. Living in shallow river environments with acoustic obstacles, these dolphins echolocate using repetitive clicks spaced 10 to 100 milliseconds apart. Their clicks are about one octave below those of oceanic toothed whales of comparable size, meaning that they provide less information about the location of an object, but the dolphins' maxillary crests likely compensate by providing greater directional sensitivity. Vocalisations used for communication include bursts and twitterings.

River dolphins feed mainly on fish and shrimp. In one meta study, around 46% of prey items were found to be bottom-dwelling species, while 31% were near the surface, and 23% occupied the middle of the column. The most frequently taken prey are bagrid catfish, barbs, glass perches, spiny eels, gobies, and prawns. When hunting at the surface, dolphins listen for the movements of schooling fish which are then herded with spins, side-swimming, and lobtailing. Echolocation signals are not frequently used at the surface, since many fish at this level can hear ultrasound. At the mid-surface level, the dolphins use more echolocation clicks to find prey hidden in clutter and vegetation as far as 20 m (66 ft) away. They flush out bottom-dwelling prey by digging around.

Little is known about reproduction in these river dolphins. Courtship and mating behaviour for the Ganges species has been documented from March to May, when the water level is lower, and involves multiple males chasing one female and ends with one of the males earning the right to mate. Calves are born around a year later. Births in the Ganges river dolphin appear to be most frequent between December and January and between March and May. For Indus river dolphins, newborns are most commonly seen between April and May. Indus river dolphins calves are around 70 cm (28 in) long at birth and may nurse for up to a year. They eat their first solid food within a couple months. South Asian river dolphins reach sexual maturity at around ten years, though males may not reach their adult size until 20 years. Growth layers in the teeth suggest South Asian river dolphins can live up to 30 years.

== Conservation ==
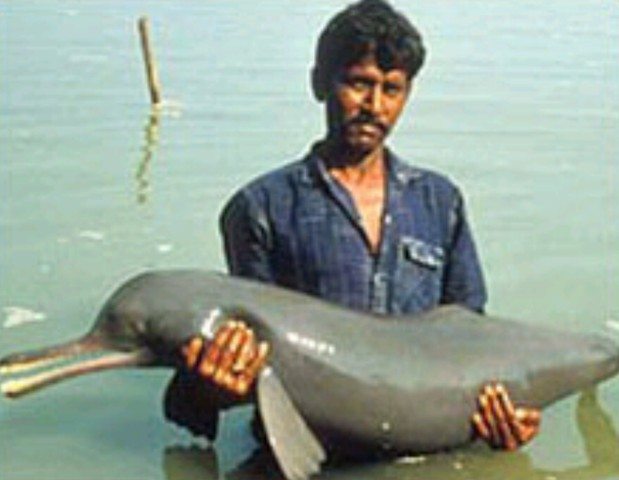
Man holding Ganges river dolphin in Bhagalpur

As of 2022, the IUCN Red List of mammals lists both South Asian river dolphins as endangered. Two assessments in 2014 and 2015 estimated populations of 3,500 for the Ganges river dolphin and 1,500 for the Indus river dolphin. A survey of Indian rivers between 2021 and 2023 found over 6,000 Ganges river dolphins and only three Indus river dolphins. The habitat of these river dolphins intersects with some of the most densely populated areas, leading to intense competition for water and resources.

The creation of dams and barrages in the Indus River system have heavily fragmented the range of the Indus river dolphin, leading to a population decline of 80% since the 19th century. Around 50 such structures have been built in the historical range of the Ganges species. Fragmentation of populations makes these dolphins more vulnerable to inbreeding. The heavy extraction of water in these dense populations also puts the dolphins at risk.

River dolphins accumulate high amounts of persistent organic pollutants, pesticides, and heavy metals in their system due to being at the top of their riverine food web. Hence, they are seen as bioindicators for the health of river systems. Fishermen compete with these animals for fish of certain sizes. Dolphins captured in fishing nets are usually accidental, but dolphin oil is sought after as a fish lure, and thus fishermen may be motivated to kill caught dolphins. Being nearly blind and relying on echolocation for navigation, river dolphins are also negatively affected by noise pollution from boats.

South Asian river dolphins are protected by law in all the states they inhabit. They can be found in numerous protected areas, including ones established specifically for them, such as the Indus Dolphin Reserve in Pakistan and the Vikramshila Gangetic Dolphin Sanctuary in India. International trade is prohibited by the listing of the South Asian river dolphins on Appendix I of the Convention on International Trade in Endangered Species. The Ganges and Indus river dolphins are considered to be the national aquatic animals of India and Pakistan respectively.

== See also ==
- Irrawaddy dolphin
- List of cetaceans
- Makara – water creature from Hindu mythology that is sometimes depicted dolphin-like
- Project Dolphin (India)
