= Macrosqualodelphis =

Macrosqualodelphis Temporal range: Burdigalian ~18.78 Ma

Scientific classification
- Domain: Eukaryota
- Kingdom: Animalia
- Phylum: Chordata
- Class: Mammalia
- Order: Artiodactyla
- Infraorder: Cetacea
- Family: †Squalodelphinidae
- Genus: †Macrosqualodelphis; Bianucci et al. 2018
- Species: †M. ukupachai

Binomial name
- †Macrosqualodelphis ukupachai Bianucci et al. 2018

Extinct genus of dolphins

Macrosqualodelphis is an extinct genus of river dolphins from the Early Miocene (Burdigalian) Chilcatay Formation of the Pisco Basin, Peru. The type species is M. ukupachai.

== Description ==
Macrosqualodelphis is distinguished from other squalodelphinids by its larger size (3.5 metres (11 ft)) and a less abrupt anterior tapering of rostrum in dorsal view, U-shaped left antorbital notch prominent nuchal crest higher than the frontals and nasals at the vertex, a thinner, blade-like lateral margin of the posterior portion of the rostrum, and a more voluminous temporal fossa and larger teeth.
