= Phocageneus =

Phocageneus Temporal range: Middle Miocene ~20–16 Ma

Scientific classification
- Domain: Eukaryota
- Kingdom: Animalia
- Phylum: Chordata
- Class: Mammalia
- Order: Artiodactyla
- Infraorder: Cetacea
- Family: †Squalodelphinidae
- Genus: †Phocageneus; Leidy 1869
- Species: †P. venustus

Binomial name
- †Phocageneus venustus Leidy 1869

Extinct genus of dolphins

Phocageneus is an extinct genus of river dolphin belonging to Squalodelphinidae. Specimens have been found in the middle Miocene Calvert Formation of Maryland and Virginia.
