= Indus river dolphin =

- Size compared to an average human

Conservation status
- Endangered (IUCN 3.1)
- CITES Appendix I

Scientific classification
- Kingdom: Animalia
- Phylum: Chordata
- Class: Mammalia
- Order: Artiodactyla
- Infraorder: Cetacea
- Family: Platanistidae
- Genus: Platanista
- Species: P. minor

Binomial name
- Platanista minor Owen, 1853
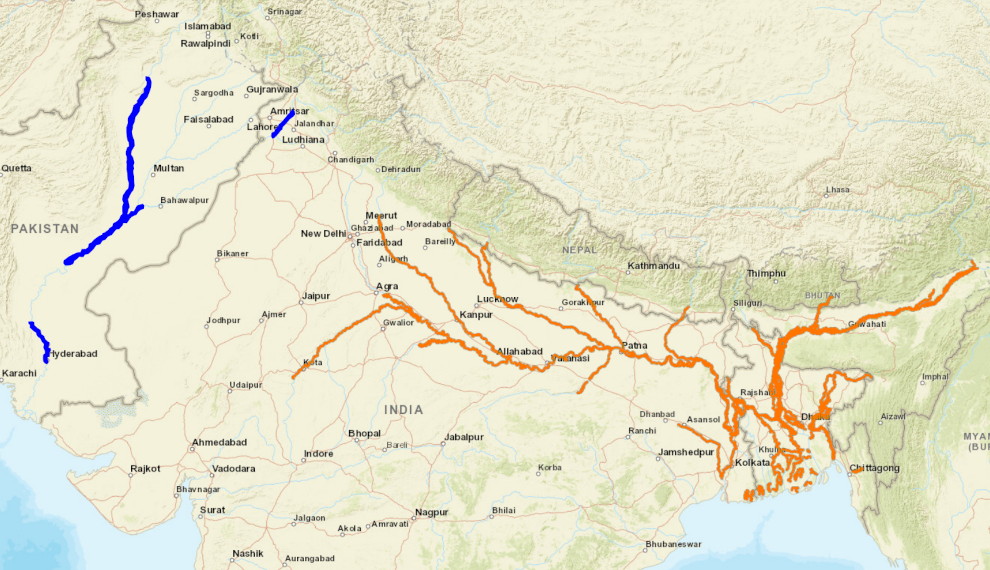
- Ranges of the Indus river dolphin and Ganges river dolphin

Dolphin species found in the Indus River

The Indus river dolphin (Platanista minor) is a freshwater dolphin in the family Platanistidae. It is endemic to the rivers of the Indus basin in Pakistan and northwestern India. It was the first discovered side-swimming cetacean. In Pakistan, it occurs in the Indus River, where five small sub-populations are separated by irrigation barrages. In India, a very small isolated population at a very high risk of extinction lives in the Beas River. It is the national mammal of Pakistan and the state aquatic animal of Punjab, India.

From the 1970s until 1998, the Ganges River dolphin (Platanista gangetica) and the Indus dolphin were regarded as separate species; however, in 1998, their classification was changed from two separate species to subspecies of the South Asian river dolphin. However, more recent studies support them being distinct species.

== Taxonomy ==
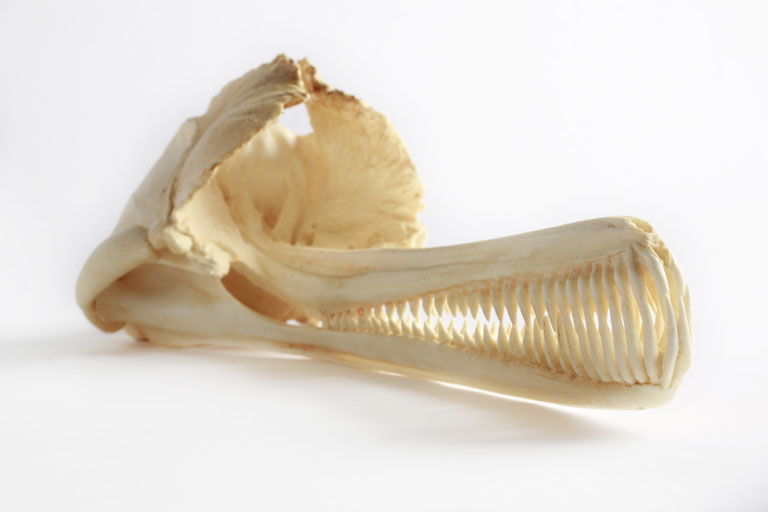
The long jaws and deep brain pan of the Indus river dolphin are visible from this skull cast. From the collection of The Children's Museum of Indianapolis.

The Indus river dolphin was described in 1853 by Richard Owen under the name Platanista gangetica, var. minor, based on a dolphin skull, which was smaller than skulls of the Ganges river dolphin.

The Indus and Ganges river dolphins were initially classified as a single species, Platanista gangetica. In the 1970s, they were considered to be distinct species, but again grouped as a single species in the 1990s. However, more recent studies of genes, divergence time, and skull structure support both being distinct species.

The Ganges river dolphin split from the Indus river dolphin during the Pleistocene, around 550,000 years ago.

== Description ==
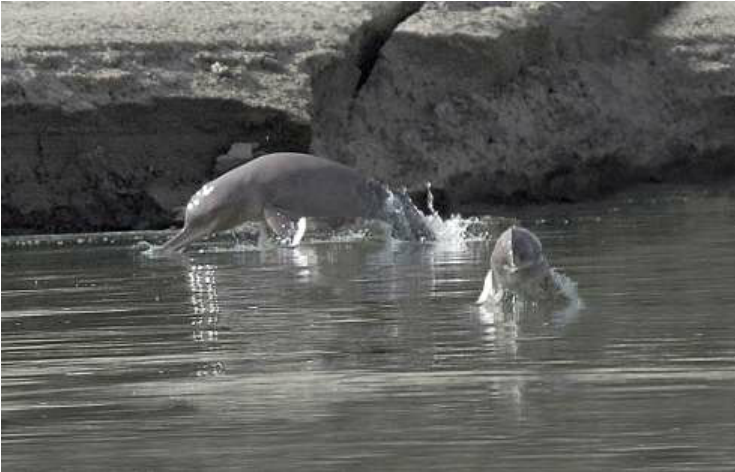
Dolphins leaping

The Indus dolphin has the long, pointed nose characteristic of all river dolphins. The teeth are visible in both the upper and lower jaws even when the mouth is closed. The teeth of young animals are almost an inch long, thin and curved; however, as animals age the teeth undergo considerable changes and in mature adults become square, bony, flat disks. The snout thickens towards its end. The species does not have a crystalline eye lens, rendering it effectively blind, although it may still be able to detect the intensity and direction of light. Navigation and hunting are carried out using echolocation. The body is a brownish color and stocky at the middle. The species has a small triangular lump in place of a dorsal fin. The flippers and tail are thin and large in relation to the body size, which is about 2–2.2 m (6 ft 7 in – 7 ft 3 in) in males and 2.4–2.6 m (7 ft 10 in – 8 ft 6 in) in females. The oldest recorded animal was a 28-year-old male 199 cm (78 in) in length.

== Distribution ==
The Indus river dolphin occurs in the Indus River system. Its range once stretched over about 3,400 km (2,100 mi) of the Indus River and its tributaries, but today, it only occurs in about 690 km (430 mi) of the river, and its range has declined by 80% since 1870; it is not present anymore in the tributaries. A remnant population is present in the Beas River and Harike Wetland located in Punjab, India.

Since the two originally inhabited river systems – between the Sukkur and Guddu barrage in Pakistan's Sindh Province, and in the Punjab and Khyber Pakhtunkhwa Provinces – are not connected in any way, how they were colonized remains unknown. The river dolphins are unlikely to have travelled from one river to another through the sea route, since the two estuaries are very far apart. A possible explanation is that several north Indian rivers such as the Sutlej and Yamuna changed their channels in ancient times while retaining their dolphin populations.

It is the second most endangered cetacean in the world. As of 2017 it is estimated that there are only about 1,800 individuals remaining (up from 1,200 estimated in 2001). In a 2021 survey, the Sindh Wildlife Department reported 2,100 individuals. Another census, carried out by Khyber Pakhtunkhwa Wildlife Department, counted 135 individuals between Chashma Barrage and Ramak boundary in 2026. A demonstrable increase in the main river population of the Indus subspecies between 1974 and 2008 may have been driven by permanent immigration from upstream tributaries, where it no longer occurs. According to an estimate conducted by the Wildlife Institute of India in 2024, only three individuals remain in the Beas River.

In Late September of 2026, a dolphin was caught in fishing nets in the Pakistani side of the Chenab River. The fisherman worked to free the dolphin and the entire incident was captured on video, making this the first confirmed sighting of the dolphin in this river since the 1970s.

== Behaviour and ecology ==
It is thought that the Indus river dolphin swims on its side to efficiently navigate shallow waters during the dry season.

== Threats ==
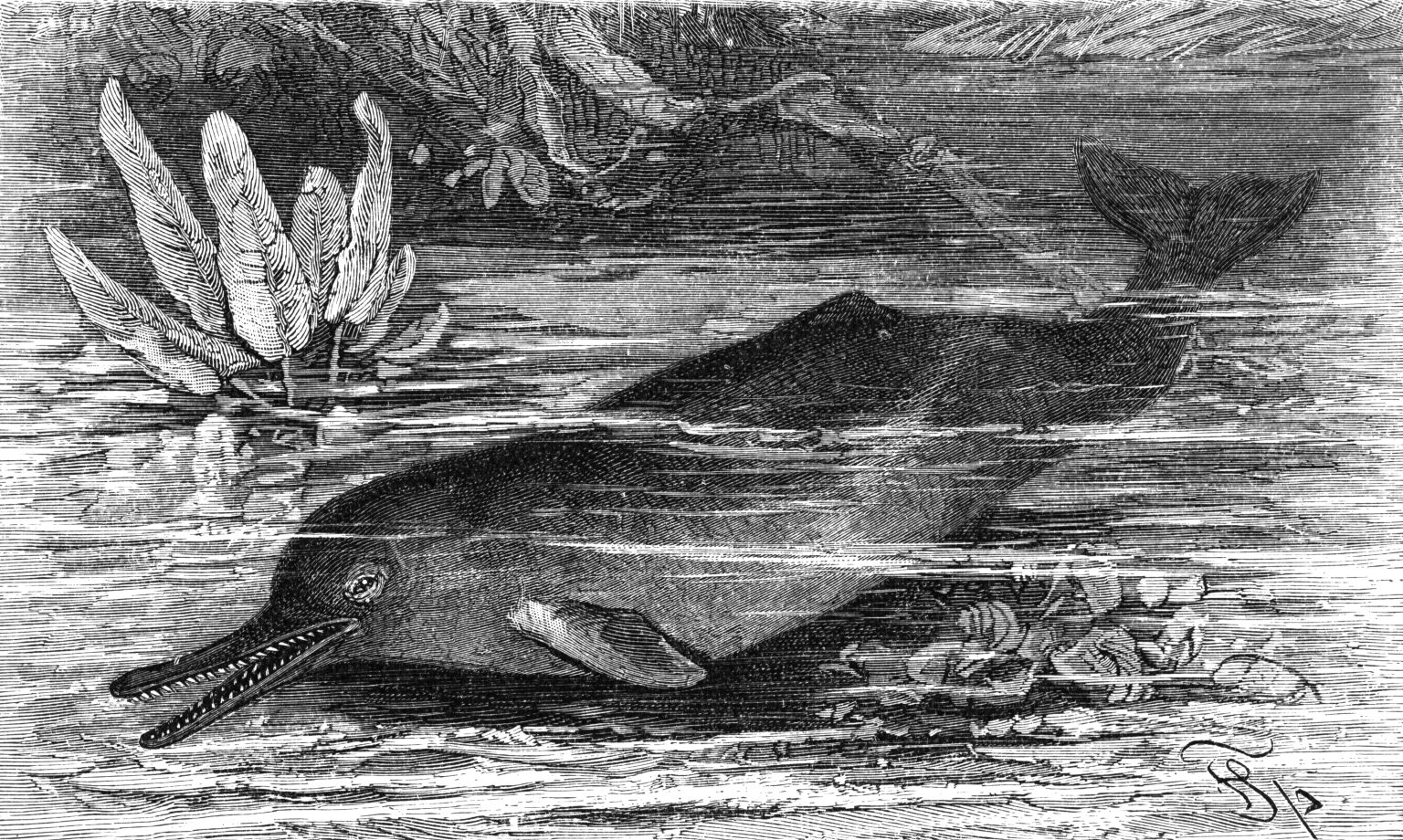
Illustration by Friedrich Specht

The Indus river dolphin has been very adversely affected by human use of the river systems in the subcontinent. Entanglement in fishing nets can cause significant damage to local population numbers. Some dolphins are still caught each year for their oil and meat that is used as a liniment, as an aphrodisiac and as bait for catfish. Irrigation has also lowered water levels throughout their ranges. Water pollution from industrial and agricultural chemicals may have also contributed to population decline. Perhaps the most significant issue is the building of dozens of dams along many rivers, causing the segregation of populations and a narrowed gene pool in which dolphins can breed. There are currently three sub-populations of Indus dolphins considered capable of long-term survival if protected. The Beas River population is also threatened by extensive fishing that reduces prey availability, and accidental entangling in fishing nets causes fatalities.

== Conservation status ==
The Indus river dolphin is protected under Appendix I of the Convention on the International Trade of Endangered Species which prohibits the commercial international trade of the species (including parts and derivatives). It is listed as Endangered on the IUCN Red List, and by the U.S. government National Marine Fisheries Service under the U.S. Endangered Species Act. A satellite tagging effort was initiated in 2022.

== See also ==
- South Asian river dolphin
- Project Dolphin (India)
- Amazon river dolphin
