= Huaridelphis =

Huaridelphis Temporal range: Early Miocene (Deseadan-Friasian) ~23.03–15.97 Ma

Scientific classification
- Kingdom: Animalia
- Phylum: Chordata
- Class: Mammalia
- Infraclass: Placentalia
- Order: Artiodactyla
- Infraorder: Cetacea
- Family: †Squalodelphinidae
- Genus: †Huaridelphis; Lambert et al. 2014
- Species: †H. raimondii

Binomial name
- †Huaridelphis raimondii Lambert et al. 2014

Extinct genus of mammals

Huaridelphis is an extinct genus of river dolphins from the Early Miocene (Deseadan to Friasian in the SALMA classification). The type species is H. raimondii, found in the Chilcatay Formation of the Pisco Basin.

== Etymology ==
The genus name is derived from the name of the Huari people, an ancient culture from Peru, and from the Latin word for "dolphin"; delphis. The specific name was chosen in honor of Antonio Raimondi, an Italian geographer and the first person to discover fossilized whale remains in Peru.

== Description ==
H. raimondii was a relatively small squalodelphinid, with a bizygomatic breadth of 207 millimetres (8.1 in) and a condylobasal length of 494 millimetres (19.4 in). The rostrum, which was only slightly dorsoventrally flattened, and made up only 67% of the condylobasal length, considerably less than most squalodelphinids. The antorbital notches were V-shaped and asymmetrical, with the right notch further back on the head than the left one. The species had 28-30 teeth per top row, with alveoli ranging in diameter between 3.7 and 5.5 millimetres (0.15 and 0.22 in). Teeth ranged from 3.35 to 6.4 millimetres (0.132 to 0.252 in) high at the crown. Ribs measured around 260 millimetres (10 in).

== Discovery ==
Fossils of H. raimondii have been recovered from the Chilcatay Formation in Ullujaya and Zamaca, in the Ica Region of Peru.

== Habitat ==
The specimens date from the Early Miocene. Specimens were found along with fossils of Isurus desori and Carcharocles chubutensis (two species of sharks), as well as those of baleen whales, Teleostei, and sea turtles. Injuries, probably from sharks, were observed on at least two of the fossils.
