= Notocetus =

Notocetus Temporal range: Early Miocene ~20.43–16 Ma

Scientific classification
- Kingdom: Animalia
- Phylum: Chordata
- Class: Mammalia
- Infraclass: Placentalia
- Order: Artiodactyla
- Infraorder: Cetacea
- Family: †Squalodelphinidae
- Genus: †Notocetus; Moreno, 1892
- Species: †N. vanbenedeni

Binomial name
- †Notocetus vanbenedeni Moreno, 1892

Synonyms
- Argyrodelphis Lydekker, 1894; Diochotichus Ameghino, 1894; Diochoticus Ameghino, 1894

Extinct genus of dolphins

Notocetus is an extinct genus of river dolphin belonging to Squalodelphinidae. Known specimens have been found in Early Miocene marine deposits from Argentina, Italy and Peru.

== Taxonomy ==
Notocetus was unnecessarily given the replacement name Diochoticus by Ameghino (1894) on the false assumption that Notocetus was preoccupied by Notiocetus. Lydekker (1894), meanwhile, erected Argyrodelphis for the same specimen. The type species of Otekaikea was once considered a species of Notocetus before being recognized as belonging to Waipatiidae.

== Distribution ==
Fossils of Notocetus have been found in:

- Monte León Formation, Argentina
- Pietra Leccese Formation, Italy
- Chilcatay Formation, Peru

== Palaeobiology ==
=== Palaeoecology ===
Paired analysis of the ultrastructure of its enamel, which was thin in the anterior teeth and thick in the posterior teeth, and its skull morphology suggests that N. vanbenedeni was a suction feeder.
