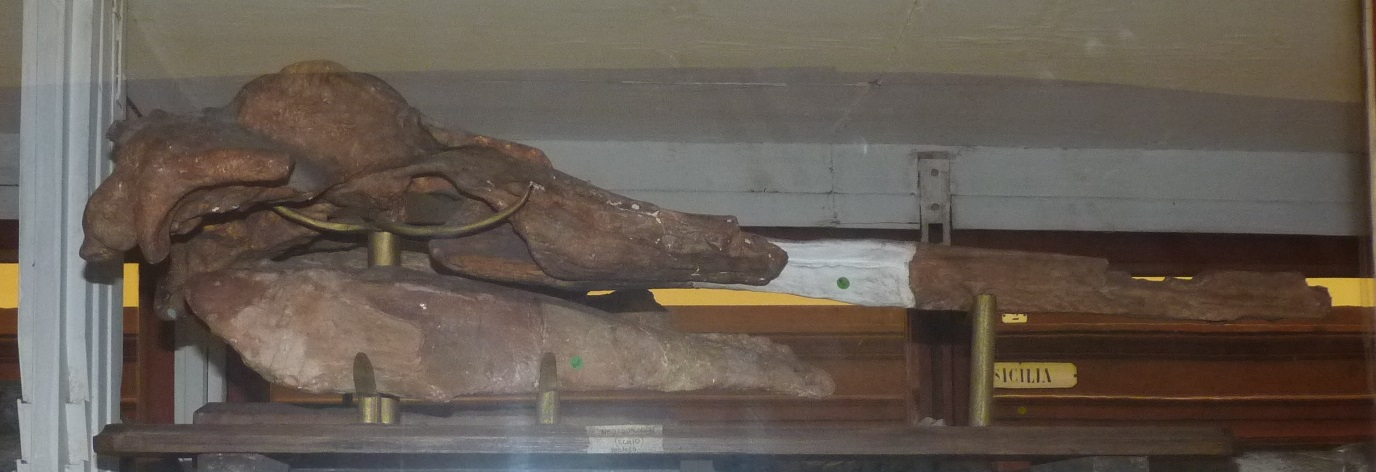
- Skull

Scientific classification
- Kingdom: Animalia
- Phylum: Chordata
- Class: Mammalia
- Order: Artiodactyla
- Infraorder: Cetacea
- Family: †Squalodontidae
- Genus: †Neosqualodon; Dal Piaz, 1904

Species
- Neosqualodon assenzae Dal Piaz, 1904 (type); Neosqualodon gastaldii (Brandt, 1873); Neosqualodon gemellaroi Fabiani, 1949

Synonyms
- Microsqualodon Abel, 1905

= Neosqualodon =

Neosqualodon Temporal range: Langhian Miocene

Extinct genus of mammals

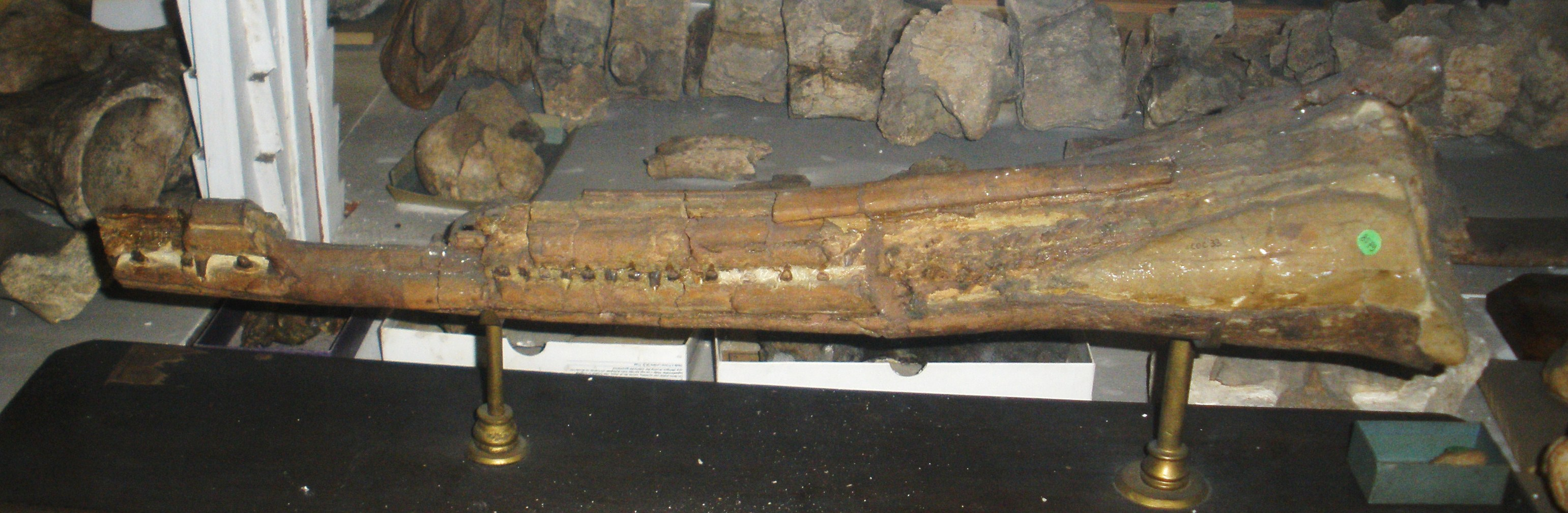
Jaw

Neosqualodon is an extinct genus of toothed cetacean, that lived in the Middle Miocene (Langhian) in what is now Italy. Their fossils - mostly teeth and jaws that are more robust and shorter than in the related genus Squalodon - have been recovered in the Ragusa Formation of Sicily. Two species are known: N. assenzae and N. gemellaroi, that are distinguished by the shape of the teeth. Apparently this genus was endemic to the pre-Mediterranean sea of the Late Oligocene.

Life reconstruction of Neosqualodon
