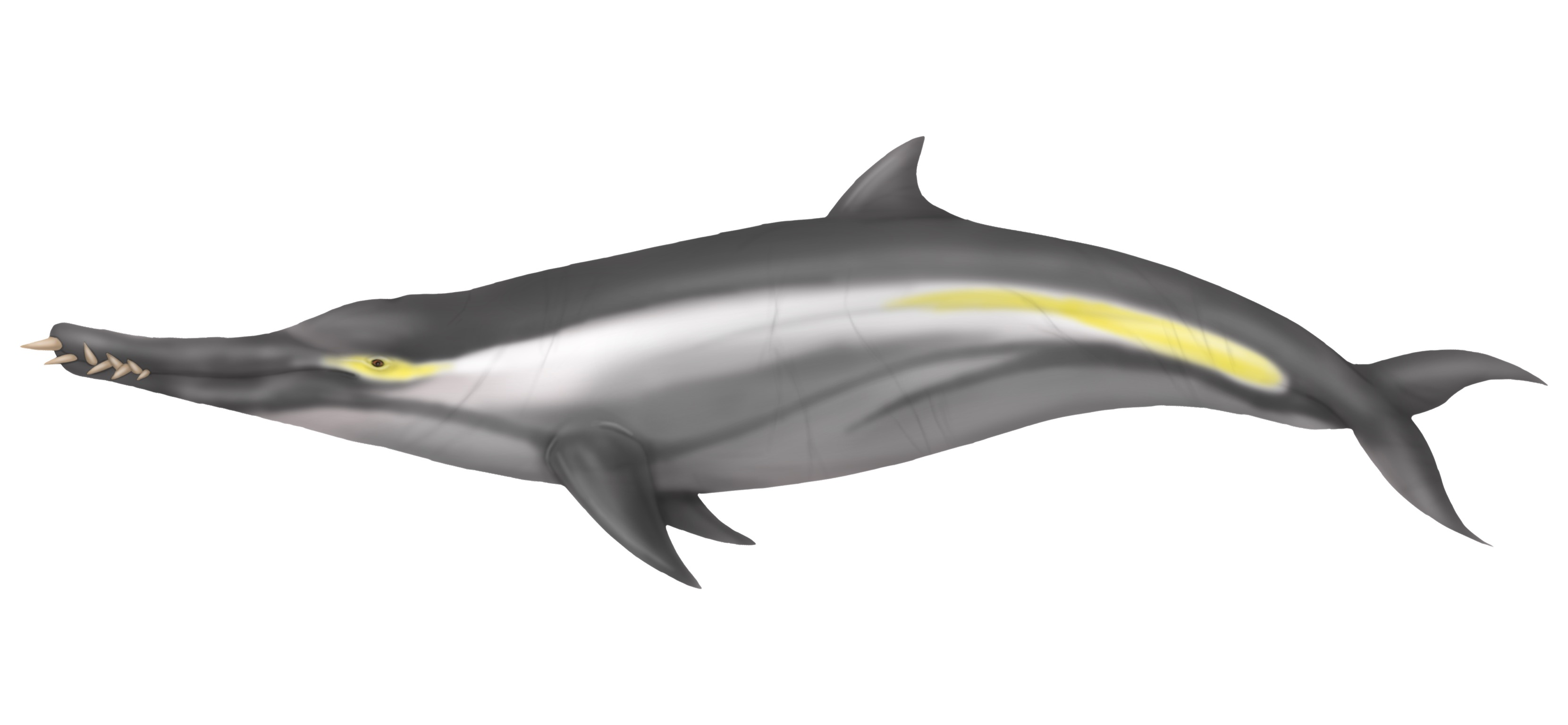

Scientific classification
- Kingdom: Animalia
- Phylum: Chordata
- Class: Mammalia
- Order: Artiodactyla
- Infraorder: Cetacea
- Superfamily: Platanistoidea
- Family: †Squalodontidae
- Genus: †Eosqualodon; Rothausen, 1968

Type species
- †Eosqualodon langewieschei Rothausen, 1968

Other species
- Eosqualodon latirostris (Capellini, 1903)

= Eosqualodon =

Eosqualodon Temporal range: Chattian-Aquitanian

Extinct genus of mammals

Eosqualodon is an extinct genus of squalodontid odontocete from the Late Oligocene to Early Miocene (Chattian-Aquitanian) of northwestern Germany and northeastern Italy.

== Taxonomy and description ==
Two species E. langewieschei and E. latirostris, have traditionally been recognised, but recent phylogenetic analysis has found the latter to not be the sister taxon to the former, thus suggesting the genus Eosqualodon is monotypic. The latter was originally described as a subspecies of Squalodon bariensis, S. b. latirostris, but is distinct from S. bariensis. Eosqualodon can be distinguished from Squalodon in having a broader rostral base, the caudal border of the external nares (blowhole) at the height of the caudal part of the orbits, and weakly developed intertemporal construction.
