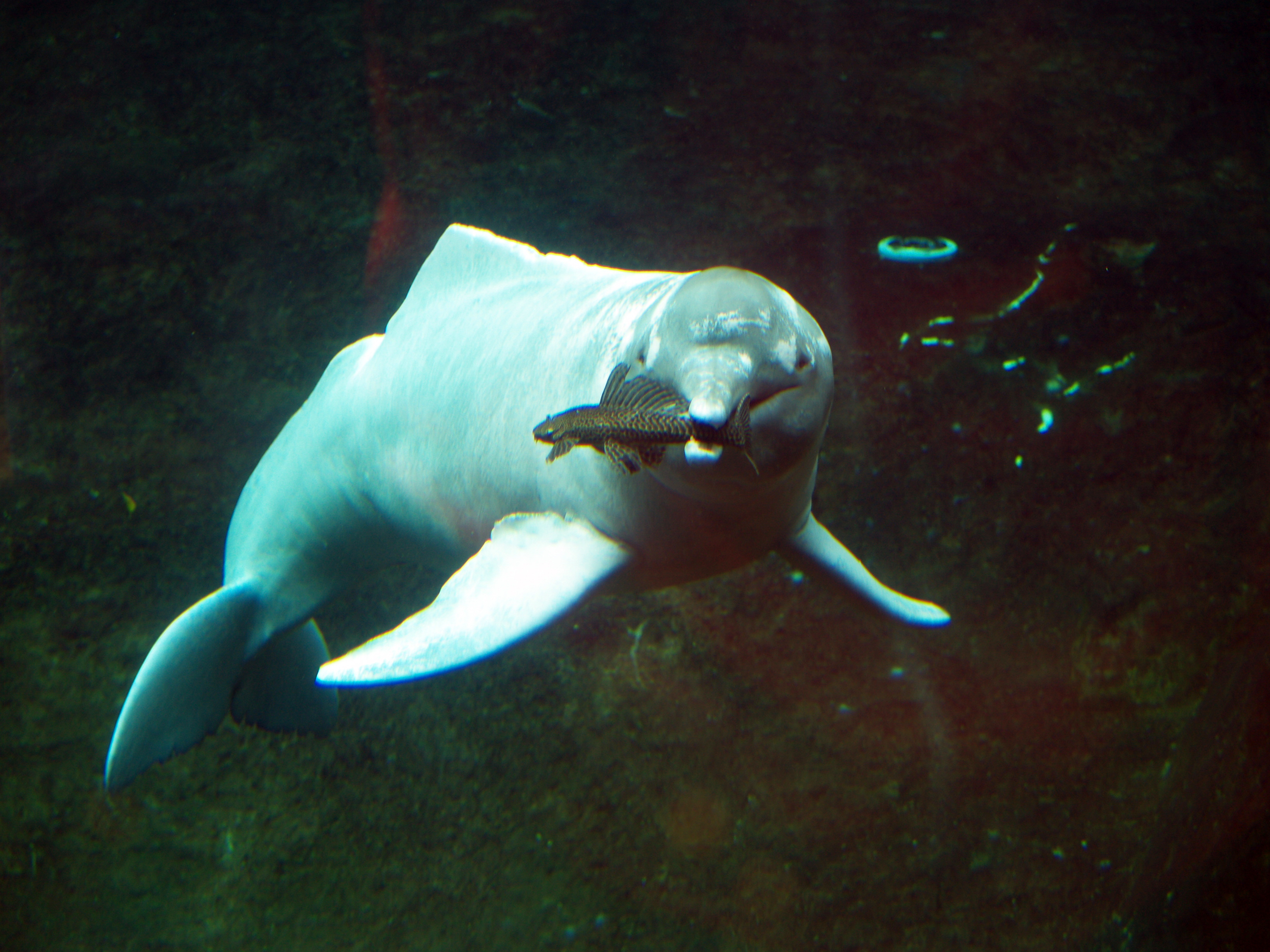
- An Amazon river dolphin at Duisburg Zoo holding an Armored catfish in the mouth.
- Size compared to an average human

Scientific classification
- Kingdom: Animalia
- Phylum: Chordata
- Class: Mammalia
- Order: Artiodactyla
- Infraorder: Cetacea
- Superfamily: Inioidea
- Family: Iniidae; Gray, 1846

Genera
- Inia

= Iniidae =

Iniidae Temporal range: Miocene-Holocene

Family of dolphins

Iniidae is a family of freshwater river dolphins containing one living genus, Inia, and four extinct genera. All currently extant species of Iniidae are native to the river basins of South America, although the fossil record indicates a wider historical range.

Iniidae exhibit several morphological differences from marine dolphins, due to having adapted to their freshwater river habitat. They display significant sexual dimorphism in color and size. Members of Iniidae commonly migrate between flooded plains and rivers, due to the variation in rainfall across different regions. Apart from the Amazon river dolphin, the family remains fairly under-researched.

== Evolution ==
During the mid-Miocene era, the South American river basins were flooded by marine waters, creating a new brackish habitat to which several species of marine mammals migrated. Marine animals that could tolerate the osmotic difference between salt and freshwater systems permeated these habitats, adapted, and thrived. Subsequently, global sea levels began to recede, trapping the mammals within the river basins of the continent.

== Morphology ==
Because their cervical vertebra are movable, the necks of Iniidae are flexible; this sets them apart from most whales, dolphins, and porpoises, which have fused neck vertebrae and aim their heads forward in a rigid fashion. The Iniidae share several morphological characteristics with other species adapted to freshwater river habitats, including highly reduced or absent dorsal fins, which help them avoid entanglement in vegetation from flooded terrestrial plains, and wide, paddle-like pectoral fins that allow for increased maneuverability in confined areas. Other adaptations include an elongated rostrum, skull, and jaw, as well as reduced orbits.

Iniidae share other characteristics with marine toothed whales. They have multiple stomachs, including a fore-stomach, a single-chambered main stomach, and a pyloric stomach, each linked by connecting channels. They also share several adaptations with their marine ancestors, including lung shape, the position of the diaphragm, the position of the blowhole (toward the back of the head), and the structure of the tympanic bulla. Iniidae have lost their fur and lack true vocal cords.

Iniidae dolphins develop multiple sets of teeth, and exhibit sets of small conical teeth that differ slightly towards the front of the mouth. The teeth have a small depression on each side in the front, and extend lingually in the back. All members of Iniidae are carnivorous, and hunt their prey via echolocation.

== Speciation ==
The number of distinct species within the genus Inia is the subject of debate within the scientific community. The number of proposed species within the genus ranges from two to four; advocates of the former number consider the remaining species to be sub-species. According to some researchers, Inia geoffrensis, Inia humboldtiana, and Inia boliviensis are three separate species, while others consider I. geoffrensis and I. boliviensis to be the only two distinct species. In 2004, a study conducted by British scientist Anthony Martin found evidence of genetic exchange occurring at multiple sites along the Amazon River, even in locations hundreds of kilometres apart.

== Taxonomy ==
The family was first described by John Edward Gray in 1846. Current classifications include a single extant genus, Inia, with two to four species and several possible subspecies. The family also includes multiple extinct genera described from fossils found in South America, Florida, Libya, and Italy.

- Superfamily Inioidea
  - Family Iniidae
    - Genus †Goniodelphis
      - G. hudsoni
    - Genus Inia
      - Inia araguaiaensis - Araguaian river dolphin
      - Inia boliviensis - Bolivian river dolphin
      - Inia geoffrensis - Amazon river dolphin
      - Inia humboldtiana - Orinoco river dolphin
    - Genus †Isthminia
      - †Isthminia panamensis
    - Genus †Meherrinia
    - Genus †Ischyrorhynchus (syn. Anisodelphis)
      - I. vanbenedeni (syn. Anisodelphis brevirostratus)
    - Genus †Saurocetes (syn. Saurodelphis, Pontoplanodes)
      - S. argentinus (syn. Pontoplanodes obliquus)
      - S. gigas
