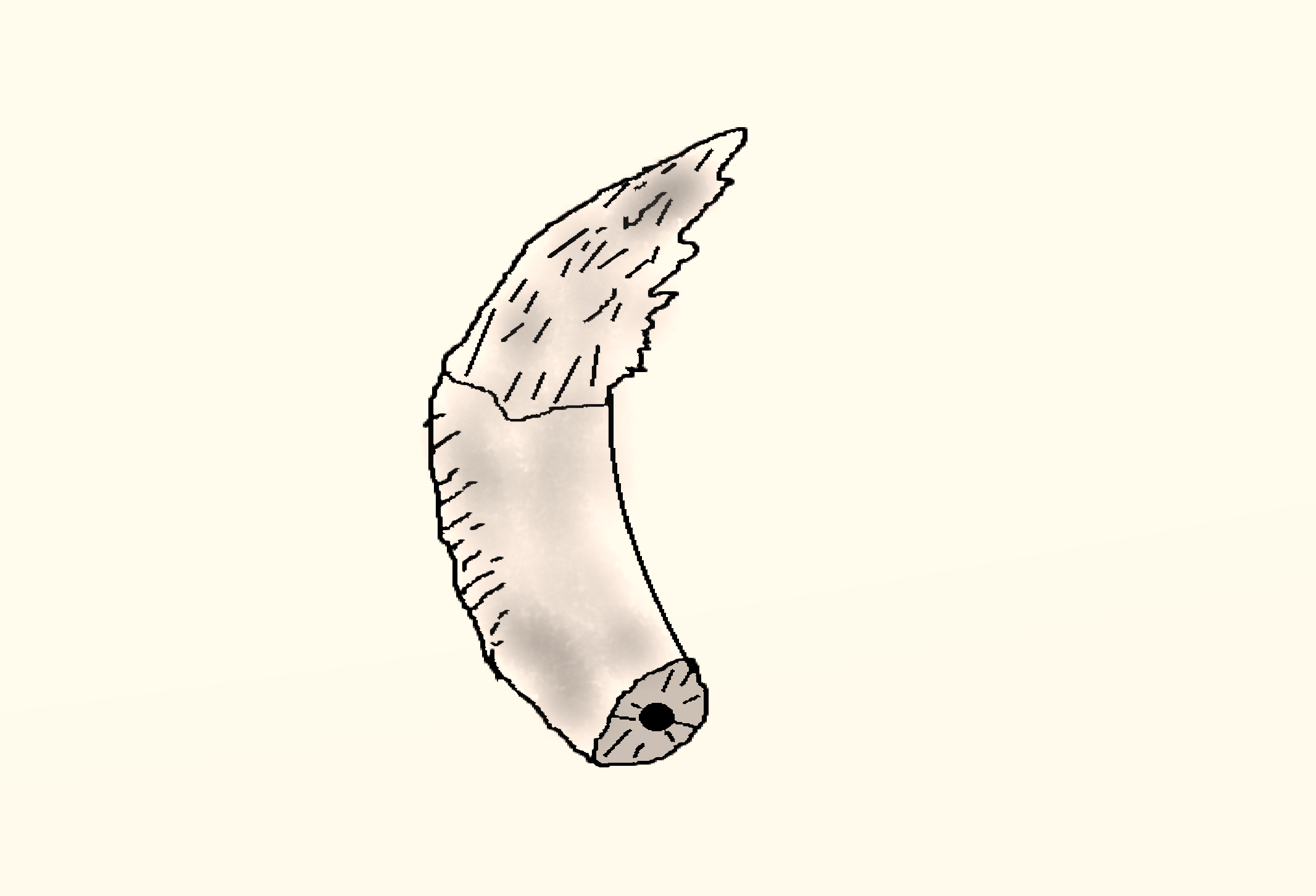
- A tooth from the type fossil

Scientific classification
- Kingdom: Animalia
- Phylum: Chordata
- Class: Mammalia
- Order: Artiodactyla
- Infraorder: Cetacea
- Family: †Squalodontidae
- Genus: †Tangaroasaurus; Benham, 1936
- Species: †T. kakanuiensis

Binomial name
- †Tangaroasaurus kakanuiensis Benham, 1936

Synonyms
- Tangarasaurus Benham 1936

= Tangaroasaurus =

Tangaroasaurus Temporal range: Miocene 16.0–13.8 Ma

Extinct genus of mammals

Tangaroasaurus is an extinct genus of squalodontid whale from the Miocene of New Zealand. It contains a single species, Tangaroasaurus kakanuiensis. Similar to Basilosaurus and its close relative Squalodon, it was originally thought to be a species of marine reptile. Parts of the holotype are presumably lost. Its name comes from Tangaroa, the Māori god of the sea, while the suffix -saurus comes from the Latin word for reptile, the group that Tangaroasaurus was originally placed in.

The type fossil was found in a grey clay deposit at All Day Bay and consists of a jaw bearing a few teeth, measuring 5 cm (2.0 in) each. The original describer of the type specimen, William Blaxland Benham, described it as a reptile, either a dinosaur such as Megalosaurus or an late surviving ichthyosaur. The genus was described as an odontocete cetacean in 1979 by R. E. Fordyce.

The status of the genus as a cetacean remains under discussion.

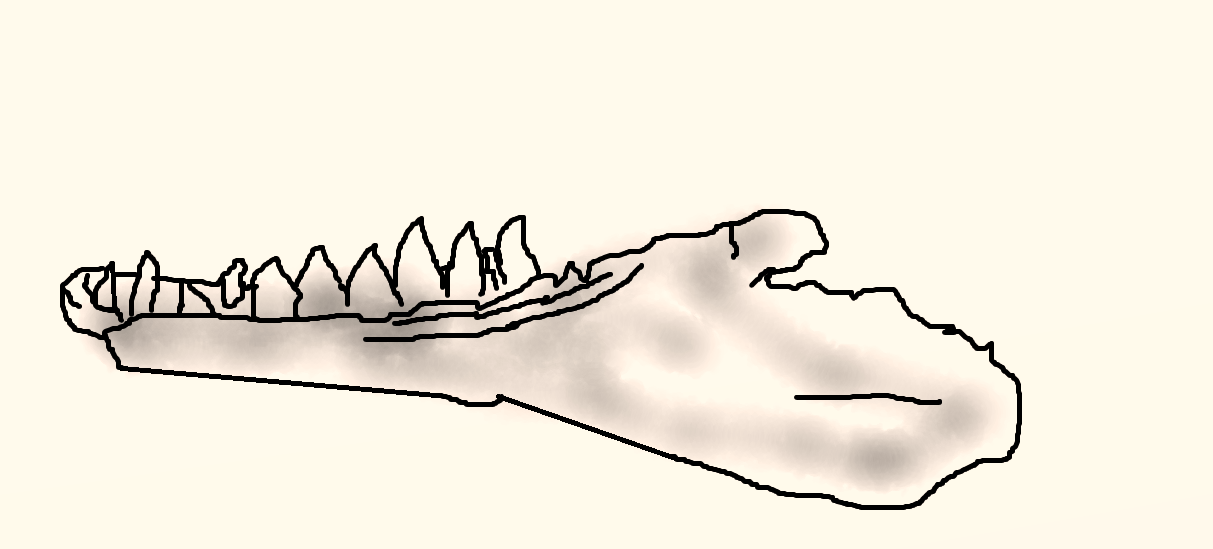
Tangaroasaurus jaw

Fossils known from the same geological formation, the All Day Bay formation and Gee Greensand Formation, include an unnamed species of Squalodelphinidae and a species of Prosqualodon.

== See also ==
- Squalodon
- Evolution of cetaceans
- Basilosaurus
