= Auroracetus =

Auroracetus Temporal range: Pliocene

Scientific classification
- Domain: Eukaryota
- Kingdom: Animalia
- Phylum: Chordata
- Class: Mammalia
- Order: Artiodactyla
- Infraorder: Cetacea
- Family: Pontoporiidae
- Genus: †Auroracetus; Gibson & Geisler 2009
- Species: †A. bakerae

Binomial name
- †Auroracetus bakerae Gibson & Geisler 2009

Extinct genus of mammals

Auroracetus, from Aurora (the location the holotype was discovered, Aurora N.C.) and the Latin cetus (whale), is a genus of Pontoporiidae, the river dolphins, and contains one extinct species. The species Auroracetus bakerae was published in 2009.

== Taxonomic history ==
=== Holotype specimen ===
The original specimen of A. bakerae was donated to the Smithsonian by Aura Baker, aided by Wayne Baker. The specimen consists of a fragmentary skull from a juvenile individual. The nasal passages (the nose or "blowhole") as well as the back of the skull were preserved, however the rostrum and basicranium were not. Classification as a new genus and species was based on the odd shape of its nasal bones, the lack of any ridge along the edges of the skull as seen in other river dolphins, and the width of the sutures, or spaces, between facial bones. The specimen was collected from the Lee Creek Mine in Aurora, North Carolina. The skull was reconstructed by Matthew Gibson, and formally described by Gibson and Jonathan Geisler in the 2009.

=== Referred specimen ===
A second specimen was recovered by a team from Georgia Southern University and described alongside the holotype. This specimen, a small fragment of the nasal area, was determined to be from an adult individual based on size and the more complete fusion of the bone material.

== See also ==
- Evolution of cetaceans
- List of cetaceans
- List of extinct cetaceans
