= Goniodelphis =

Goniodelphis Temporal range: Miocene

Scientific classification
- Domain: Eukaryota
- Kingdom: Animalia
- Phylum: Chordata
- Class: Mammalia
- Order: Artiodactyla
- Infraorder: Cetacea
- Family: Iniidae
- Genus: †Goniodelphis; Allen, 1941

Extinct genus of mammals

Goniodelphis hudsoni is an extinct iniid river dolphin known from the waters of Florida during the Miocene ~14.9—11.5 through 9.1—8.7 Ma (AEO).

The fossil specimens were found in just four phosphate mines in Polk County, Florida. These mines were:

- American Agricultural Chemical Company (Serravallian)
- Fort Green (Hemphillian)
- Payne Creek (Hemphillian)
- Gardinier (Zanclean)

== Taxonomy ==
Goniodelphis was named by Allen (1941). Its type is Goniodelphis hudsoni. It was considered monophyletic by Mark D. Uhen, Ph.D. of George Mason University in 2010. It was assigned to Delphinidae by Carroll (1988); and to Iniidae by Allen (1941), Kellogg (1944), de Muizon (1988), Morgan (1994), McKenna and Bell (1997), Hamilton et al. (2001), Fordyce and de Muizon (2001), Uhen et al. (2008) and Mark D. Uhen.
