= Stenasodelphis =

Stenasodelphis Temporal range: Tortonian

Scientific classification
- Domain: Eukaryota
- Kingdom: Animalia
- Phylum: Chordata
- Class: Mammalia
- Order: Artiodactyla
- Suborder: Whippomorpha
- Infraorder: Cetacea
- Family: Pontoporiidae
- Genus: †Stenasodelphis; Godfrey & Barnes, 2008
- Species: †S. russellae

Binomial name
- †Stenasodelphis russellae Godfrey & Barnes, 2008

Extinct genus of dolphin

Stenasodelphis is an extinct genus of pontoporiid dolphin from the mid-late Miocene epoch. Its name roughly translates to "the narrow-nosed dolphin." The genus is currently monotypic, containing only the species S. russellae. The specific epithet honors Mrs. Jean Hooper (née Russell), who discovered the holotype. It was found in material derived from zone 22-23 of St. Marys Formation, which dates to the early Tortonian.
