= Meherrinia =

Meherrinia Temporal range: Late Miocene

Scientific classification
- Kingdom: Animalia
- Phylum: Chordata
- Class: Mammalia
- Order: Artiodactyla
- Infraorder: Cetacea
- Family: incertae sedis
- Genus: †Meherrinia; Geisler, et al., 2012
- Species: †M. isoni

Binomial name
- †Meherrinia isoni Geisler, et al., 2012

Extinct genus of mammals

Meherrinia is an extinct genus of inioid river dolphin from the Meherrin River, North Carolina, in the United States. First described in 2012, the dolphin is, in most respects, intermediate in form between the living Amazon river dolphin and the La Plata dolphin, although it is probably more closely related to the former. However, the fossil was discovered in what are believed to be marine deposits, dating from the late Miocene, whereas the Amazon river dolphin is an exclusively freshwater species. Meherrinia therefore was, as of 2012, the only known marine genus of the family Iniidae, although others have been discovered since. Only one species is known.
