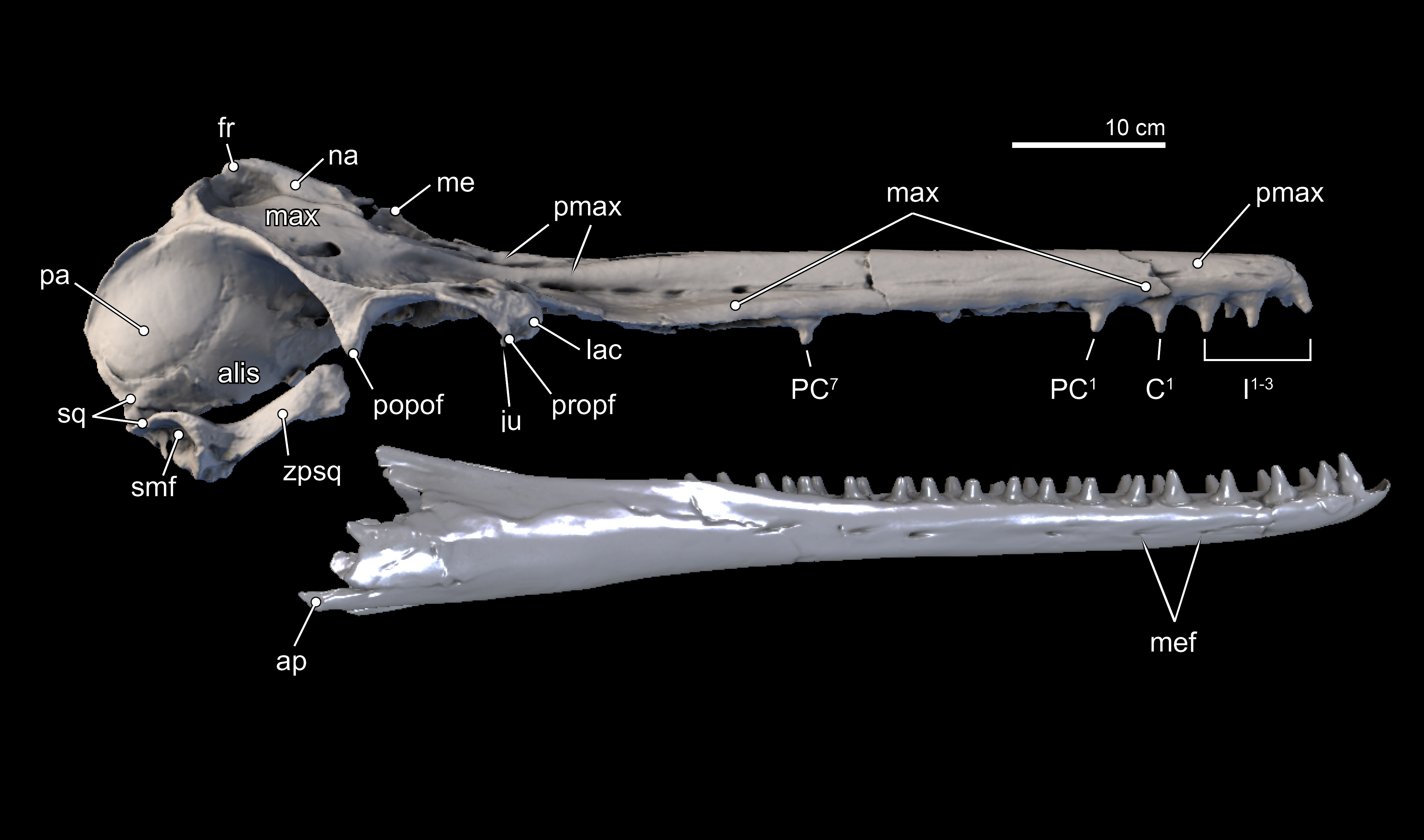
- Holotype skull (digital model) in right lateral view

Scientific classification
- Kingdom: Animalia
- Phylum: Chordata
- Class: Mammalia
- Order: Artiodactyla
- Infraorder: Cetacea
- Superfamily: Inioidea
- Family: Iniidae
- Genus: †Isthminia; Pyenson et al., 2015

Type species
- †Isthminia panamensis Pyenson et al., 2015

= Isthminia =

Isthminia Temporal range: Late Miocene (Messinian), ~6.1–5.8 Ma

Extinct genus of mammals

Isthminia (named after the Republic of Panama and its people) is a genus of medium-sized river dolphin cetaceans that lived during the Late Miocene epoch in what is now the coasts of Panama, about 6.1 million to 5.8 million years ago. The type species is I. panamensis, known from the littoral Chagres Formation.

== Description ==
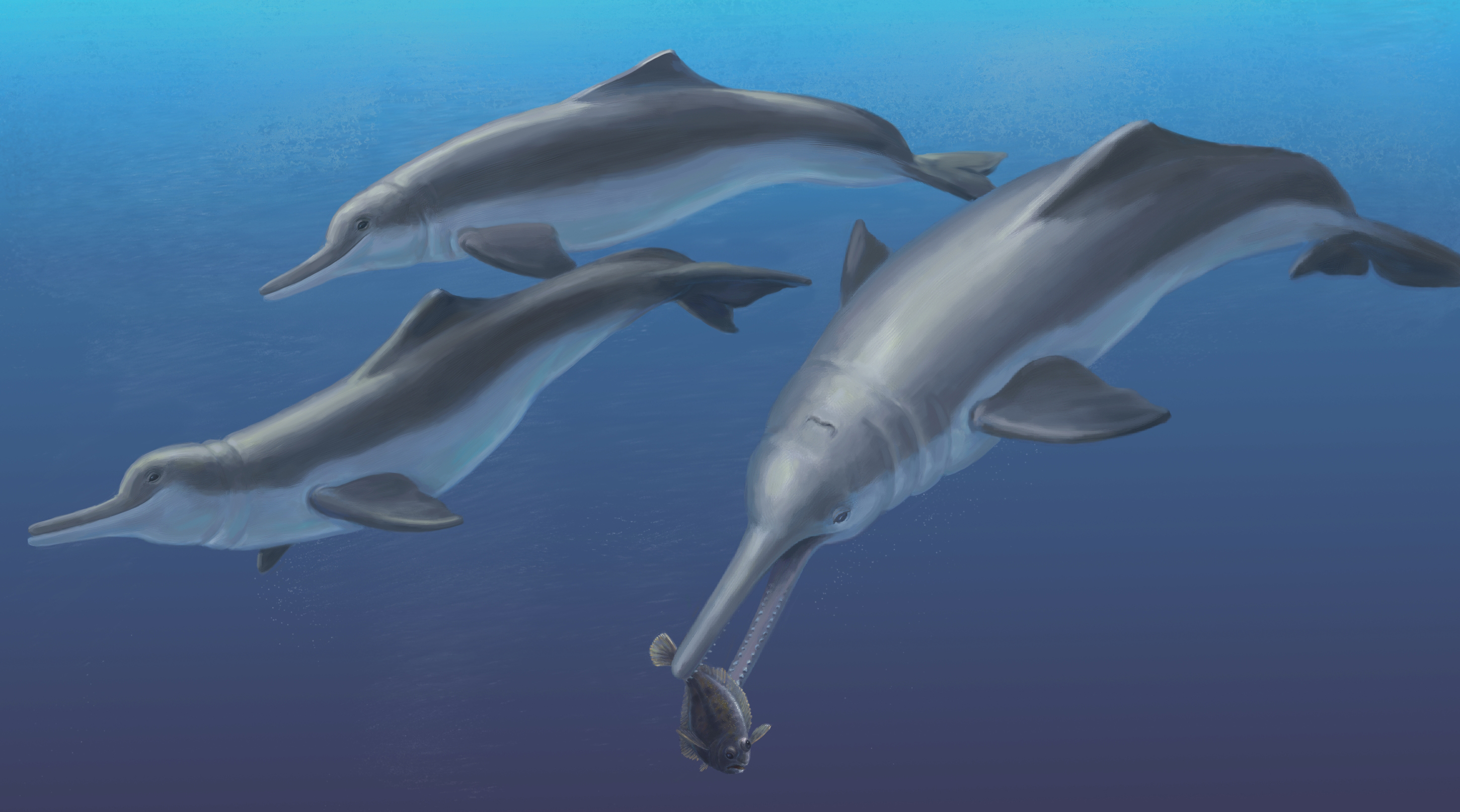
Life restoration of Isthminia

Fossils of Isthminia were found in the Chagres Formation in Panama. On the basis of the fossil material, including a partial skull, the length of Isthminia is estimated to be about 2.85 m (9.4 ft) long. Isthminia probably had a predominantly marine lifestyle.

== See also ==
- Evolution of cetaceans
