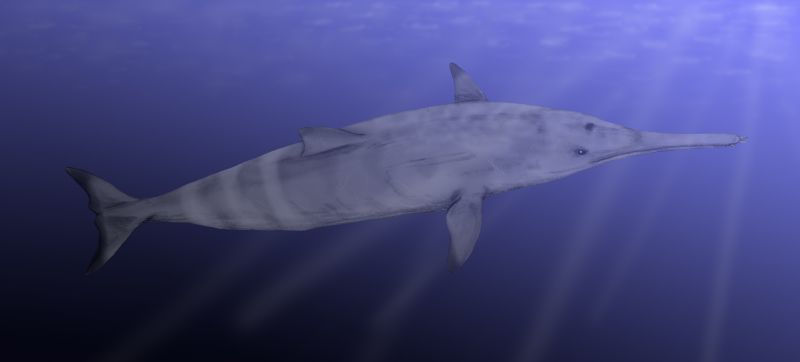
- Squalodon

Scientific classification
- Domain: Eukaryota
- Kingdom: Animalia
- Phylum: Chordata
- Class: Mammalia
- Order: Artiodactyla
- Infraorder: Cetacea
- Superfamily: Platanistoidea
- Family: †Squalodontidae; Brandt 1873

Genera
- Eosqualodon Rothausen 1968; Neosqualodon Dal Piaz, 1904; Squalodon Grateloup 1840; ?Tangaroasaurus Benham 1935; ?Phoberodon Cabrera, 1926

= Squalodontidae =

Squalodontidae Temporal range: Late Oligocene–Middle Miocene

Extinct family of mammals

Squalodontidae or the shark-toothed dolphins is an extinct family of large toothed whales who had long narrow jaws. Squalodontids are known from all continents except Antarctica, from the Oligocene to the Neogene, but they had a maximal diversity and global distribution during the Late Oligocene and Early to Middle Miocene (28 to 15 mya).

With their cosmopolitan Miocene distribution and heterodont dentition, squalodontids are the most common and basal platanistoids. They are relatively large odontocetes, comparable in size to extant mesoplodont whales. The premaxillae on their elongated rostrum have large and slightly convex fossae for the air sacs associated with the presence of a melon, indicating the ability for echolocation.

Squalodon and Eosqualodon are based on partial or complete skulls. The synapomorphic traits of the family are, however, based mostly on one of the bones of the inner ear, the periotic bone, which is unknown in these genera except in Squalodon. The monophyly of the family is, therefore, uncertain. Patriocetus has also been included.

Some squalodontids are known from rather complete fossils, but most were described based on a few isolated teeth. Squalodontids are most likely very distantly related to extant oceanic dolphins but, according to French palaeontologist Christian de Muizon, more closely related to the South Asian river dolphin (Platanista gangetica).

The genus Squalodon was named by French naturalist Jean-Pierre Sylvestre de Grateloup in 1840 based on a jaw fragment he thought belonged to a reptile. Fossils discovered later, nevertheless, showed that this was a toothed whale. In extant odontocetes, however, the dentition is atavistic with all teeth reduced to simple, undifferentiated conical shapes. In squalodonts the teeth resemble those of the archaic whales, Archaeoceti, with conical incisors anteriorly and low-crowned, serrated teeth posteriorly.
