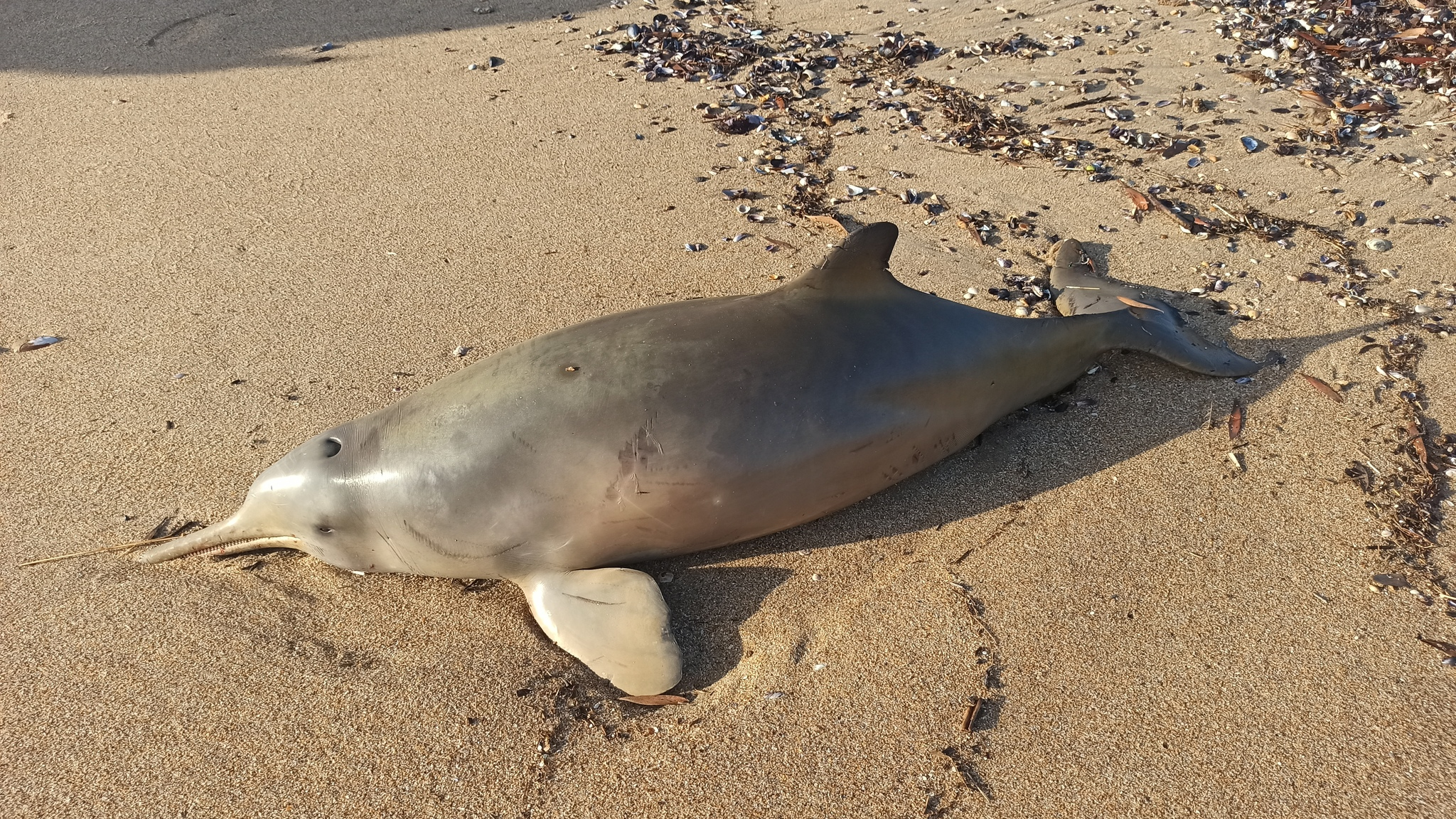
- La Plata Dolphin, Pontoporia blainvillei

Scientific classification
- Kingdom: Animalia
- Phylum: Chordata
- Class: Mammalia
- Order: Artiodactyla
- Infraorder: Cetacea
- Parvorder: Odontoceti
- Superfamily: Inioidea
- Family: Pontoporiidae; Gray, 1870

Genera
- †Auroracetus †Brachydelphis †Piscorhynchus †Pontistes; Pontoporia †Protophocaena †Samaydelphis †Scaldiporia †Stenasodelphis

= Pontoporiidae =

Pontoporiidae Temporal range: Aquitanian–Recent

Family of Cetaceans

Pontoporiidae is a family of toothed whales containing the extant genus Pontoporia and ten extinct genera. Pontoporia contains the family's sole extant species, the La Plata dolphin, which is endemic to southeastern South America.
