= Valencia Aquarium =

Valencia's Aquarium
- Interactive map of Valencia's Aquarium
- 10°11′20″N 68°00′38″W
- Date opened: 21 December 1975
- Location: Valencia, Venezuela
- No. of animals: ~1300
- No. of species: ~115 at the aquarium ~115 at the zoo, terrarium and serpentarium
- Website: www.aquariumdevalencia.com

Valencia Aquarium (officially Acuario de Valencia, Fundación Seijas) is a recreational park located in Valencia, Venezuela. It is the largest aquarium in Venezuela, and it also has a small zoo with species from Venezuela. It is operated by the J.V. Seijas Foundation.

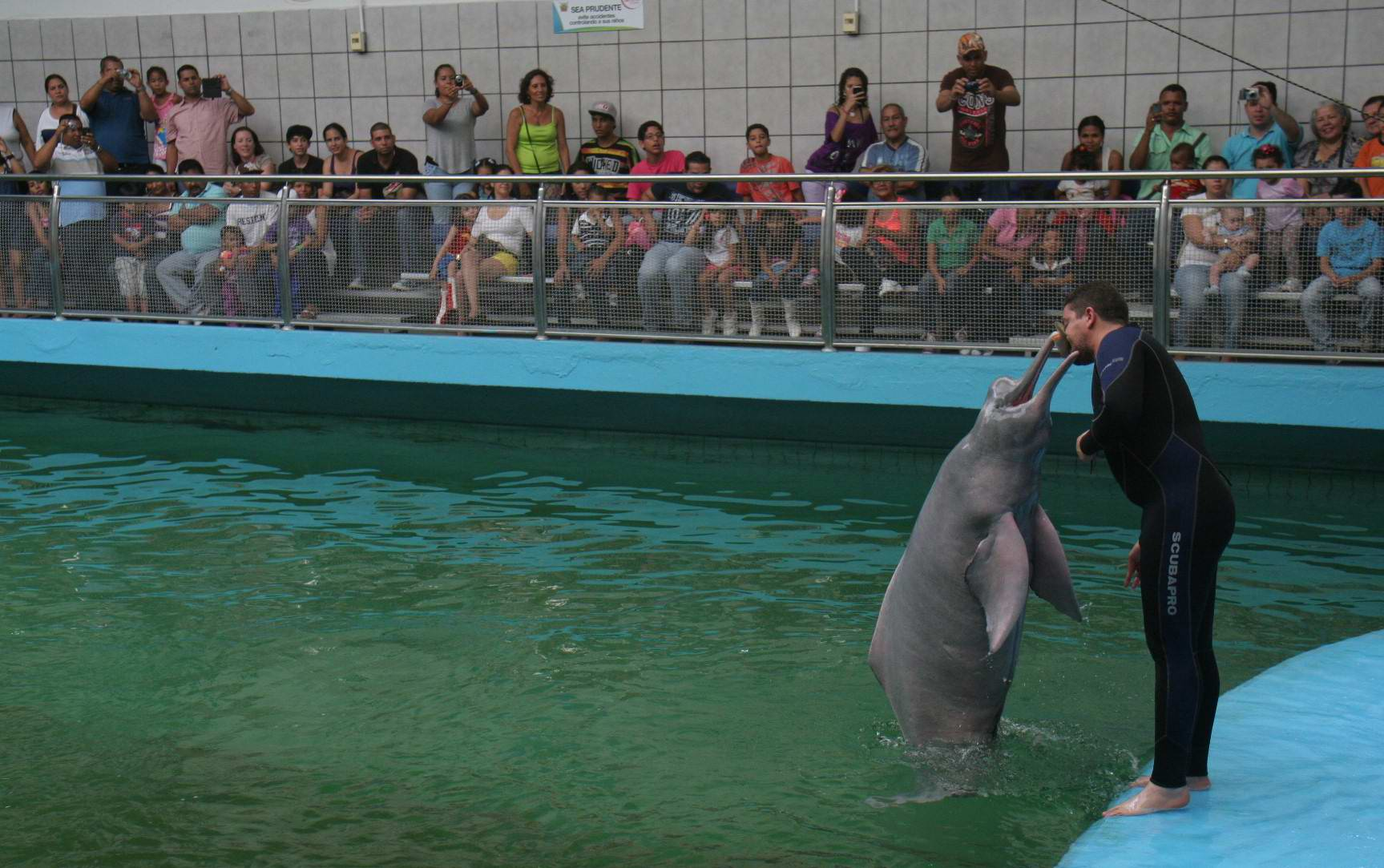
One of the aquarium's former Amazon river dolphins

From 1975 until 2016, this aquarium had some of the only trained captive Amazon river dolphins left in the world. As of 2025, the species as a whole is no longer kept in captivity.

It also has many species of fish, snakes and other animals as well as plants endemic to Venezuela.

In addition to the animals, there is also a small park for children, with bumper cars, a carousel, and other games.
