= River dolphin =

Polyphyletic grouping of dolphins

River dolphins
Freshwater dolphins
- River or Freshwater dolphins are not a taxon, they are an informal grouping of the infraorder Cetacea

Information
- Families considered river/freshwater dolphins: Parvorder Odontoceti; Family Platanistidae; Family Lipotidae; Family Iniidae; Family Pontoporiidae
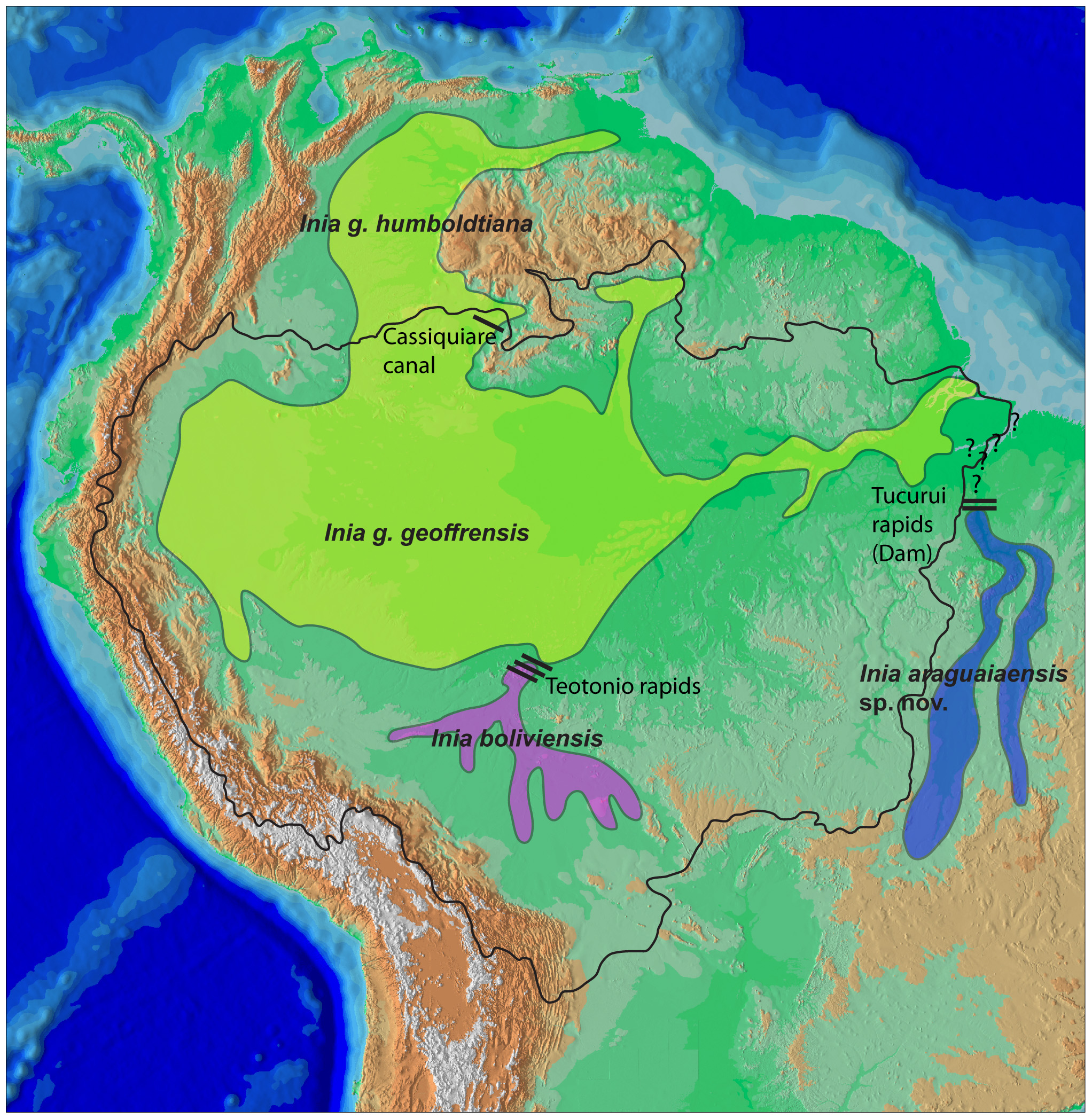
- New World range map

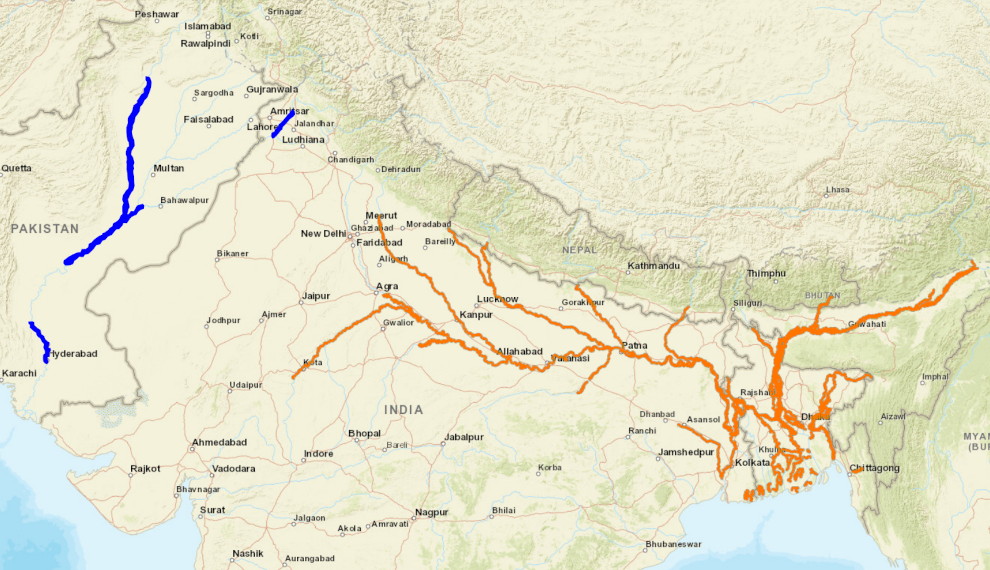
- Old World range map

River dolphins, also called freshwater dolphins, are a polyphyletic group of fully aquatic mammals that reside exclusively in freshwater or even in brackish water. They are an informal grouping of dolphins, which itself is a paraphyletic group within the infraorder Cetacea. These dolphins are placed in three superfamilies, Platanistoidea (Platanistidae), Inioidea (Iniidae and Pontoporiidae) and Lipotoidea (Lipotidae). They comprise the families Platanistidae (the South Asian dolphins), the possibly extinct Lipotidae (Yangtze River dolphin), Iniidae (the Amazonian dolphins) and Pontoporiidae (the La Plata dolphins). There are five extant species of river dolphins. River dolphins, alongside other cetaceans, belong to the clade Artiodactyla, with even-toed ungulates, and their closest living relatives the hippopotamuses, from which they diverged about 40 million years ago. Specific types of dolphins can be pink.

River dolphins are relatively small compared to oceanic dolphins, having evolved to survive in warm, shallow waters and strong river currents. They range in size from the 5-foot (1.5 m) long South Asian river dolphin to the 8-foot (2.4 m) and 220-pound (100 kg) Amazon river dolphin. Several species exhibit sexual dimorphism, in that the females are larger than the males. They have streamlined bodies and two limbs that are modified into flippers. River dolphins use their conical-shaped teeth and long beaks to capture fast-moving prey in murky water. They have well-developed hearing that is adapted for both air and water; they do not really rely on vision since their eyes are very small and the water they swim in is usually very muddy. Instead, they tend to rely on echolocation when hunting and navigating. These species are well-adapted to living in warm, shallow waters, and, unlike other cetaceans, have little to no blubber.

River dolphins are not very widely distributed; they are all restricted to certain rivers or deltas. This makes them extremely vulnerable to habitat destruction. River dolphins feed primarily on fish. Male river dolphins typically mate with multiple females every year, but females only mate every two to three years. Calves are typically born in the spring and summer months and females bear all the responsibility for raising them. River dolphins produce a variety of vocalizations, usually in the form of clicks and whistles.

Compared to other cetaceans, river dolphins were rarely kept in captivity; with some of the leading causes being poor breeding success and frequent deaths within a few months of capture. As of 2025, there are no river dolphins (of any species) left in human care.

== Taxonomy and evolution ==
=== Classification ===
Four families of river dolphins (Iniidae, Pontoporiidae, Lipotidae and Platanistidae) are currently recognized, comprising three superfamilies (Inioidea, Lipotoidea and Platanistoidea). Platanistidae, containing the two subspecies of South Asian river dolphin, is the only living family in the superfamily Platanistoidea. Previously, many taxonomists had assigned all river dolphins to a single family, Platanistidae, and treated the Ganges and Indus river dolphins as separate species. A December 2006 survey found no members of Lipotes vexillifer (commonly known as the baiji, or Chinese river dolphin) and declared the species functionally extinct.

The current classification of river dolphins is as follows:

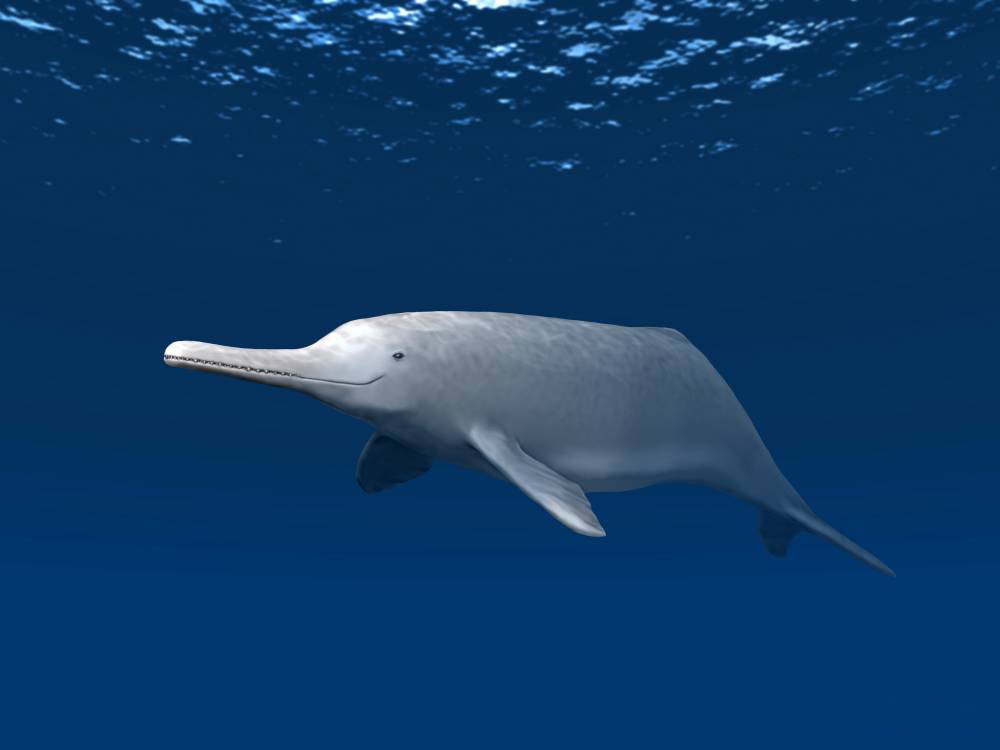
Life reconstruction of Arktocara yakataga, an allodelphinid

- Superfamily Platanistoidea
  - Family Platanistidae
    - Genus Platanista
      - South Asian river dolphin, Platanista gangetica, with two subspecies
        - Ganges river dolphin (susu), P. g. gangetica
        - Indus river dolphin (bhulan), P. g. minor
  - Family †Allodelphinidae (Oligocene - Miocene)
  - Family †Squalodelphinidae (Oligocene to Miocene)
  - Family †Squalodontidae (Oligocene to Miocene)
  - Family †Waipatiidae (Oligocene to Miocene)
- Superfamily Inioidea
  - Family Iniidae
    - Genus Inia
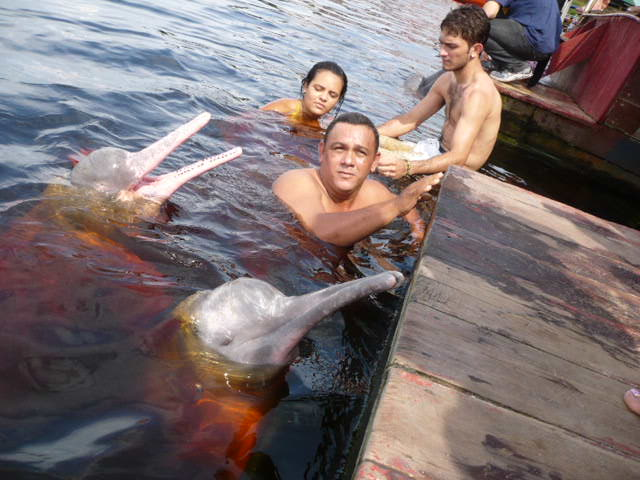
      Amazon river dolphin
      - Amazon river dolphin (boto), Inia geoffrensis
        - Inia geoffrensis geoffrensis
        - Inia geoffrensis humboldtiana
      - Araguaian river dolphin, Inia araguaiaensis
      - Bolivian river dolphin, Inia boliviensis
    - Genus †Meherrinia (late Miocene)
    - Genus †Isthminia (Miocene)
  - Family Pontoporiidae
    - Genus †Auroracetus
      - †Auroracetus bakerae
    - Genus Pontoporia
      - La Plata dolphin (Franciscana), Pontoporia blainvillei
- Superfamily Lipotoidea
  - Family Lipotidae
    - Genus Lipotes
      - Baiji (or Chinese river dolphin), Lipotes vexillifer

In 2012 the Society for Marine Mammalogy began considering the Bolivian (Inia geoffrensis boliviensis) and Amazonian (Inia geoffrensis geoffrensis) subspecies as full species Inia boliviensis and Inia geoffrensis, respectively; however, much of the scientific community, including the IUCN, continue to consider the Bolivian population to be a subspecies of Inia geoffrensis.

In October 2014, the Society for Marine Mammalogy took Inia boliviensis and Inia araguaiaensis off their list of aquatic mammal species and subspecies and currently does not recognize these species-level separations.

=== Evolution ===
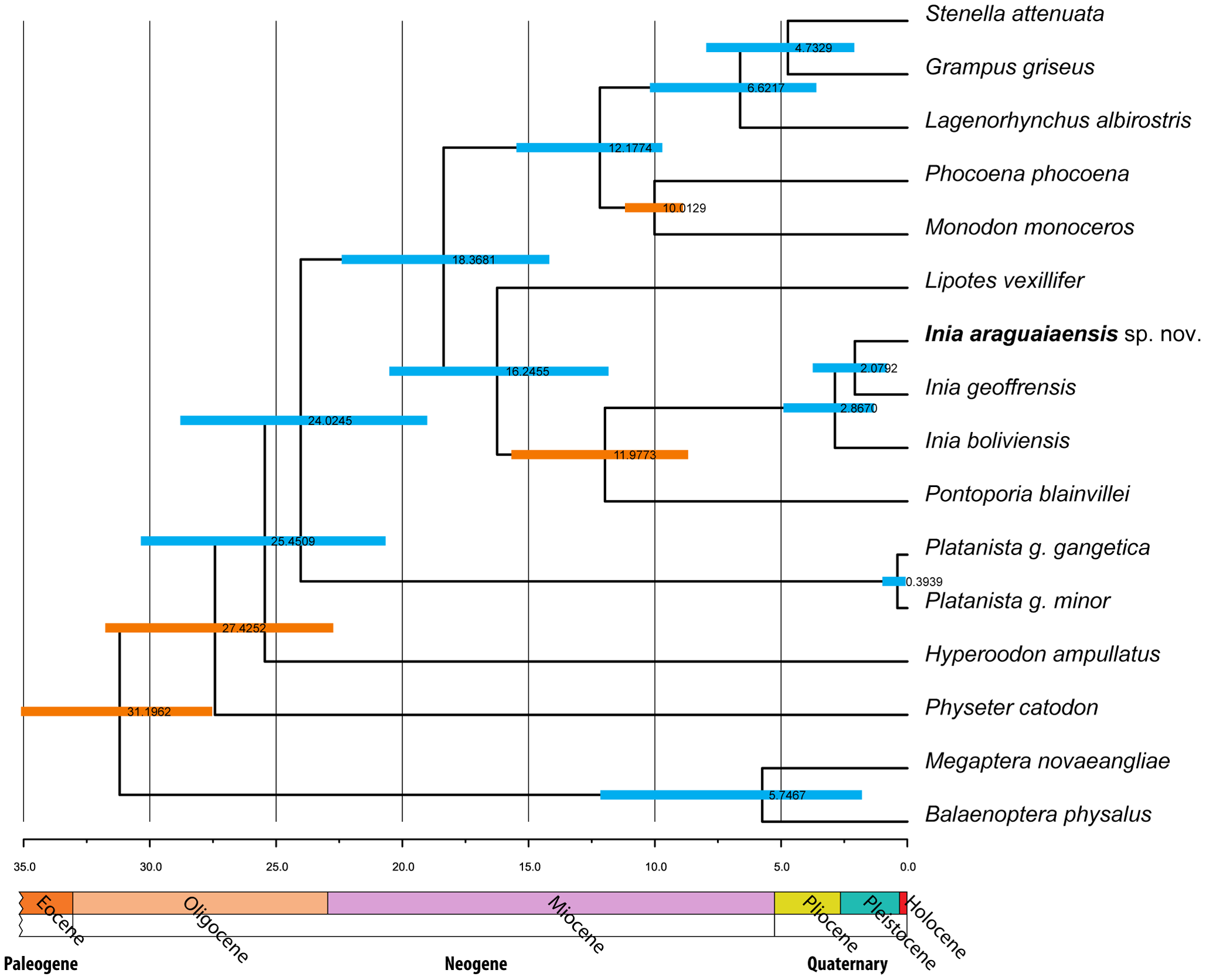
Phylogeny of cetaceans based on cytochrome b gene sequences, showing the distant relationship between Platanista and other river dolphins.

River dolphins are members of the infraorder Cetacea, which are descendants of land-dwelling mammals of the order Artiodactyla (even-toed ungulates). They are related to the Indohyus, an extinct chevrotain-like ungulate, from which they split approximately 48 million years ago. The primitive cetaceans, or archaeocetes, first took to the sea approximately 49 million years ago and became fully aquatic by 5–10 million years later. It is unknown when river dolphins first ventured back into fresh water.

River dolphins are thought to have relictual distributions, that is, their ancestors originally occupied marine habitats, but were then displaced from these habitats by modern dolphin lineages. Many of the morphological similarities and adaptations to freshwater habitats arose due to convergent evolution; thus, a grouping of all river dolphins is polyphyletic. Amazon river dolphins are actually more closely related to oceanic dolphins than to South Asian river dolphins. Isthminia panamensis is an extinct genus and species of river dolphin, living 5.8 to 6.1 million years ago. Its fossils were discovered near Piña, Panama.

River dolphin has been considered a taxonomic description, suggesting an evolutionary relationship among the group, although it is now known that they form two distinct clades. 'True' river dolphins are descendants of ancient evolutionary lineages that evolved in freshwater environments.

Some species of cetacean live in rivers and lakes, but are more closely related to oceanic dolphins or porpoises and entered fresh water more recently. Such species are considered facultative freshwater cetaceans as they can use both marine and freshwater environments. These include species such as the Irrawaddy dolphin, Orcaella brevirostris, found in the Mekong, Mahakam, the Irrawaddy Rivers, as well as the Yangtze finless porpoise Neophocaena asiaeorientalis. Some oceanic cetacean populations are known to live semi-permanently in river and estuarine systems, such as the Indo-Pacific bottlenose dolphin group resident in the Swan River of Western Australia which travel as far inland as Belmont.

The tucuxi (Sotalia fluviatilis) in the Amazon River is another species descended from oceanic dolphins; however, it does not perfectly fit the label of 'facultative' either, as it occurs only in fresh water. The tucuxi was until recently considered conspecific with the Guiana dolphin (Sotalia guianensis), which inhabits marine waters. It may also be true for the Irrawaddy dolphin and the finless porpoise that, although the species may be found in both freshwater and marine environments, individual animals found in rivers may not be able to survive in the ocean, and vice versa. The tucuxi is currently classified as an oceanic dolphin (Delphinidae).

The Franciscana (Pontoporia blainvillei) has shown a converse evolutionary pattern, and has an ancient evolutionary lineage in freshwater, but inhabits estuarine and coastal waters.

== Biology ==
=== Anatomy ===
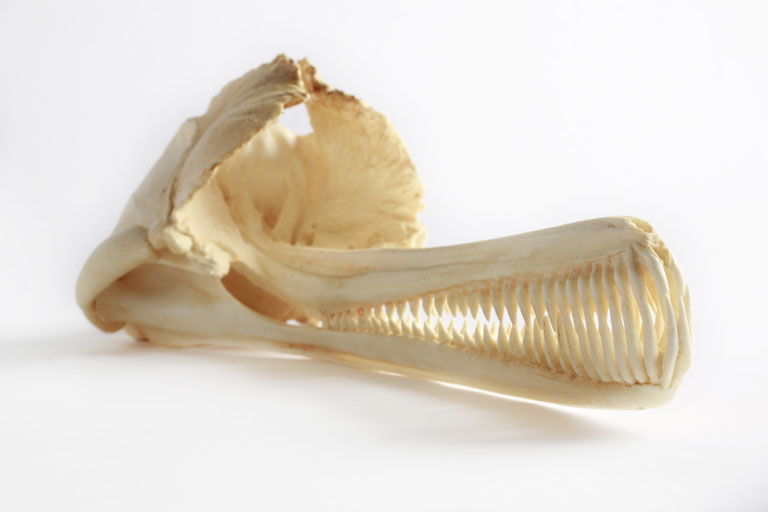
Indus river dolphin skull

River dolphins have a torpedo shaped body with a flexible neck, limbs modified into flippers, non-existent external ear flaps, a tail fin, and a small bulbous head. River dolphin skulls have small eye orbits, a long snout and eyes placed on the sides of the head. River dolphins are rather small, ranging in size from the 5-foot (1.5 m) long South Asian river dolphin to the 8-foot (2.4 m) and 220-pound (100 kg) Amazon river dolphin. They all have female-biased sexual dimorphism apart from Amazon river dolphin, with the females being larger than the males. River dolphins are polygynous, meaning male river dolphins typically mate with multiple females every year, but females only mate every two to three years. Calves are typically born in the spring and summer months and females bear all the responsibility for raising them.

River dolphins have conical teeth, used to catch swift prey such as small river fish. They also have very long snouts, with some measuring 23 inches (58 cm), four times longer than most of their oceanic counterparts. They have a two-chambered stomach that is similar in structure to that of terrestrial carnivores. They have fundic and pyloric chambers. Breathing involves expelling stale air from their blowhole, followed by inhaling fresh air into their lungs. They do not have the iconic spout, as this only forms when the warm air exhaled from the lungs meets cold external air, which does not occur in their tropical habitats.

River dolphins have a relatively thin layer of blubber. Blubber can help with buoyancy, protection from predators (they would have a hard time getting through a thick layer of fat), energy for leaner times, and insulation from harsh climates. The habitats of river dolphins lack these needs.

=== Locomotion ===
River dolphins have two flippers and a tail fin. These flippers contain five digits. Although river dolphins do not possess fully developed hind limbs, some possess discrete rudimentary appendages, which may contain feet and digits. River dolphins are slow swimmers in comparison to oceanic dolphins, which can travel at speeds up to 35 miles per hour (56 km/h); the tucuxi can only travel at about 14 miles per hour (23 km/h). Unlike other cetaceans, their neck vertebrae are not fused together, meaning they have greater flexibility than other non-terrestrial aquatic mammals, at the expense of speed. This means they can turn their head without actually moving their entire body. When swimming, river dolphins rely on their tail fins to propel themselves through the water. Flipper movement is continuous. River dolphins swim by moving their tail fins and lower bodies up and down, propelling themselves through vertical movement, while their flippers are mainly used for steering. All species have a dorsal fin.

=== Senses ===
Biosonar by cetaceans

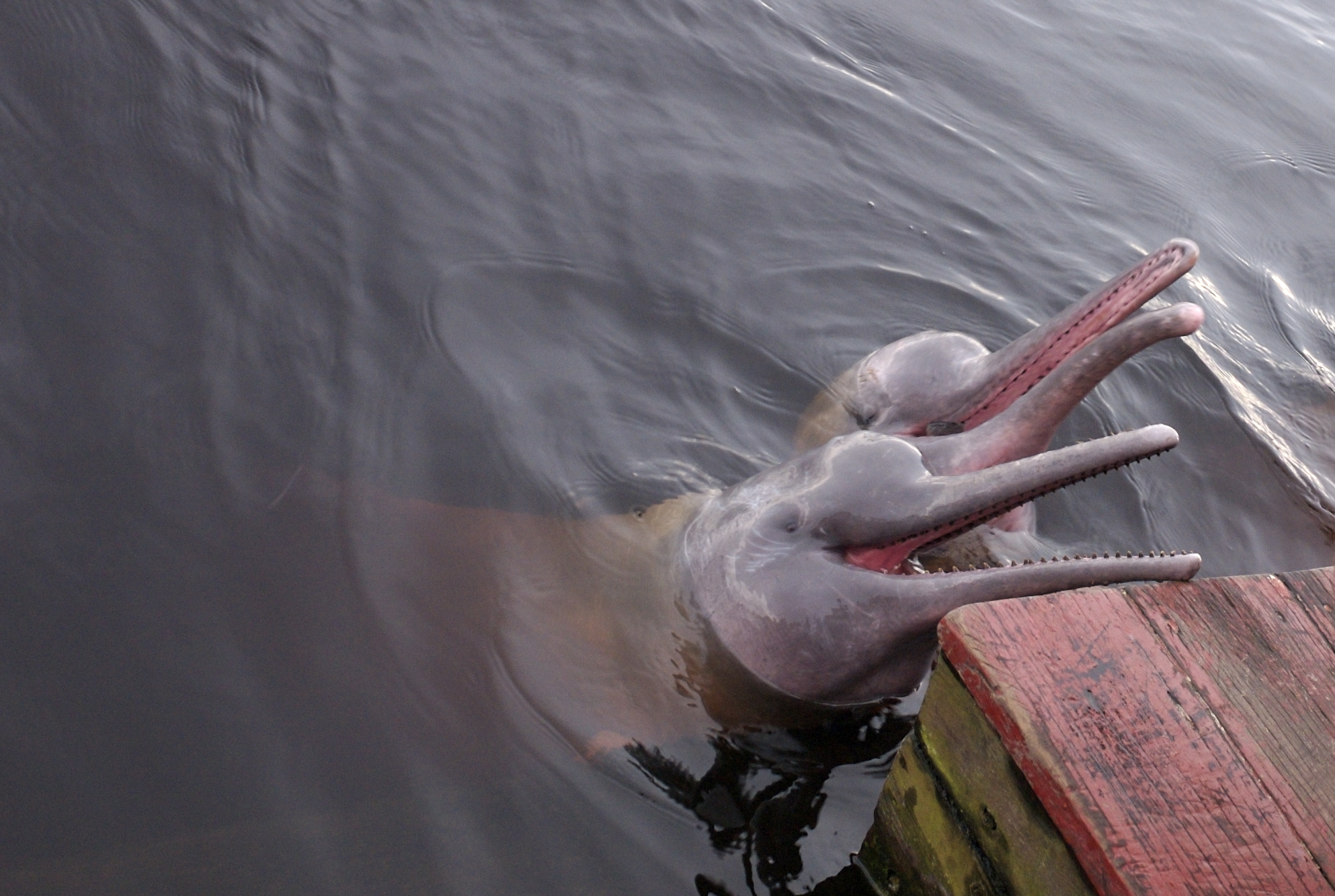
River dolphins have very small eyes

The ears of river dolphins have specific adaptations to their aquatic environment. In humans, the middle ear works as an impedance equalizer between the outside air's low impedance and the cochlear fluid's high impedance. In river dolphins, and other cetaceans, there is no great difference between the outer and inner environments. Instead of sound passing through the outer ear to the middle ear, river dolphins receive sound through the throat, from which it passes through a low-impedance fat-filled cavity to the inner ear. The ear is acoustically isolated from the skull by air-filled sinus pockets, which allows for greater directional hearing underwater. Dolphins send out high frequency clicks from an organ known as a melon. This melon consists of fat, and the skull of any such creature containing a melon will have a large depression. This allows river dolphins to produce biosonar for orientation. They are so dependent on echolocation that they can survive even if they are blind. Beyond locating an object, echolocation also provides the animal with an idea on the object's shape and size, though how exactly this works is not yet understood. The small hairs on the rostrum of the Amazon river dolphin are believed to function as a tactile sense, possibly to compensate for their poor eyesight.

River dolphins have very small eyes for their size, and do not have a very good sense of sight. In addition, the eyes are placed on the sides of the head, so the vision consists of two fields, rather than a binocular view like humans have. When river dolphins surface, their lens and cornea correct the nearsightedness that results from the refraction of light. They have both rod and cone cells, meaning they can see in both dim and bright light. Most river dolphins have slightly flattened eyeballs, enlarged pupils (which shrink as they surface to prevent damage), slightly flattened corneas and a tapetum lucidum; these adaptations allow for large amounts of light to pass through the eye and, therefore, a very clear image of the surrounding area. They also have glands on their eyelids and an outer corneal layer that act as protection for the cornea.

Olfactory lobes are absent in river dolphins, suggesting that they have no sense of smell.

River dolphins are not thought to have a sense of taste, as their taste buds are atrophied or missing altogether. However, some dolphins have preferences between different kinds of fish, indicating some sort of attachment to taste.

== Interactions with humans ==
=== Threats ===
==== Development ====
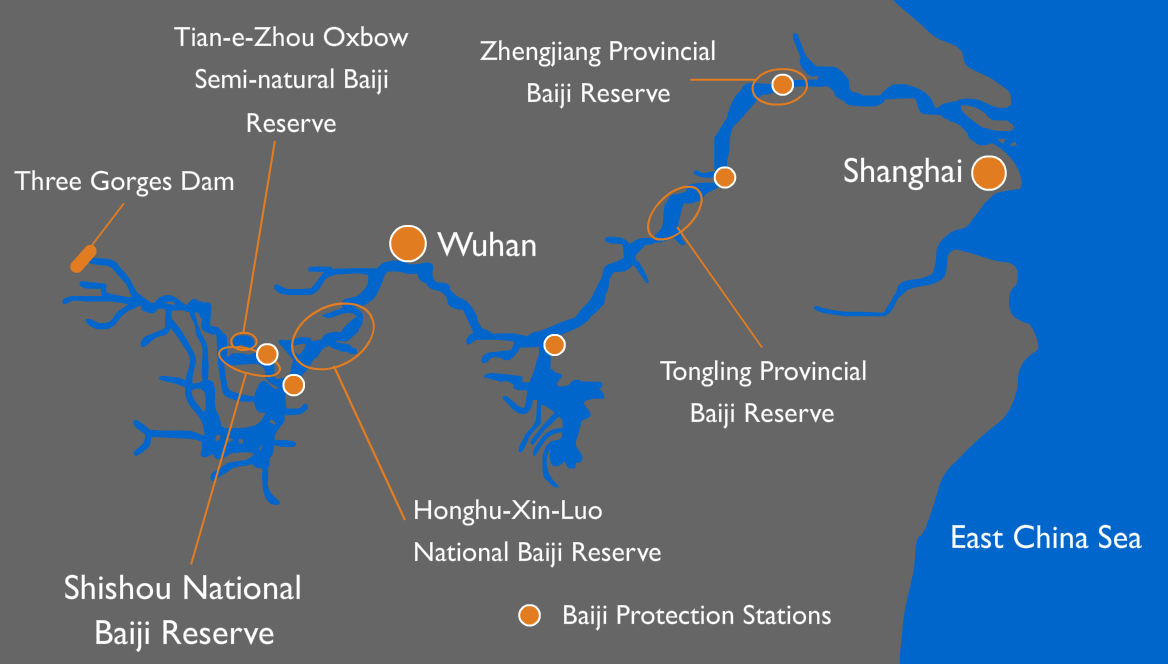
Conservation areas for the baiji along the Yangtze River

Development and agriculture have had devastating impacts on the habitats of river dolphins. The total population of Araguaian river dolphins is estimated to be between 600 and 1,500 individuals, and genetic diversity is limited. The ecology of their habitat has been adversely affected by agricultural, ranching and industrial activities, as well as by the use of dams for hydroelectric power. The inhabited section of the Araguaia River probably extends over about 900 miles (1,400 km) out of a total length of 1,300 miles (2,100 km). The Tocantins river habitat is fragmented by six hydroelectric dams, so the population there is at particular risk. Its probable eventual IUCN status is vulnerable or worse.

Both subspecies of South Asian river dolphins (Ganges river dolphin and the Indus river dolphin) have been very adversely affected by human use of the river systems in the Indian subcontinent. Irrigation has lowered water levels throughout both subspecies' ranges. Poisoning of the water supply from industrial and agricultural chemicals may have also contributed to population decline. Perhaps the most significant issue is the building of more than 50 dams along many rivers, causing the segregation of populations and a narrowed gene pool in which the dolphins can breed. Currently, three subpopulations of Indus river dolphins are considered capable of long-term survival if protected.

As China developed economically, pressure on the baiji river dolphin grew significantly. Industrial and residential waste flowed into the Yangtze. The riverbed was dredged and reinforced with concrete in many locations. Ship traffic multiplied, boats grew in size, and fishermen employed wider and more lethal nets. Noise pollution caused the nearly blind animal to collide with propellers. Stocks of the dolphin's prey declined drastically in the late 20th century, with some fish populations declining to one thousandth of their pre-industrial levels. In the 1950s, the population was estimated at 6,000 animals, but declined rapidly over the subsequent five decades. Only a few hundred were left by 1970. Then the number dropped down to 400 by the 1980s and then to 13 in 1997 when a full-fledged search was conducted. On December 13, 2006, the baiji (Lipotes vexillifer) was declared "functionally extinct", after a 45-day search by leading experts in the field failed to find a single specimen. The last verified and widely accepted sighting was in September 2004, but it has been allegedly seen and photographed by Chinese citizens on four occasions since then.

==== Competition ====
The region of the Amazon in Brazil has an extension of 3,100,000 mi^{2} (8,000,000 km^{2}) containing diverse fundamental ecosystems. One of these ecosystems is a floodplain, or a várzea forest, and is home to a large number of fish species which are an essential resource for human consumption. The várzea is also a major source of income through excessive local commercialized fishing. Várzea consist of muddy river waters containing a vast number and diversity of nutrient-rich species. The abundance of distinct fish species lures the Amazon River dolphin into the várzea areas of high water occurrences during the seasonal flooding.

In addition to attracting predators such as the Amazon river dolphin, these high-water occurrences are an ideal location to draw in the local fisheries. Human fishing activities directly compete with the dolphins for the same fish species, the tambaqui (Colossoma macropomum) and the pirapitinga (Piaractus brachypomus), resulting in deliberate or unintentional catches of the Amazon river dolphin. The local fishermen overfish, and when the Amazon river dolphins remove the commercialized fish from the nets and lines, it damages the equipment and the capture and causes a negative reaction from the local fishermen. The Brazilian Institute of Environment and Renewable Natural Resources prohibit fishermen from killing the Amazon river dolphin, yet they are not compensated for the damage to their equipment and the loss of their catch.

==== Bycatch ====
During the process of catching the commercialized fish, the Amazon river dolphins get caught in the nets and exhaust themselves until they die, or the local fishermen deliberately kill the dolphins that become entangled in their nets. The carcasses are discarded, consumed, or used as bait to attract a scavenger catfish, the piracatinga (Calophysus macropterus). The use of the Amazon river dolphin carcass as bait for the piracatinga dates back from 2000. The increasing consumption demand by the local inhabitants and Colombia for the piracatinga has created a market for distribution of the Amazon river dolphin carcasses to be used as bait throughout these regions.

For example, of the 15 dolphin carcasses found in the Japurá River in 2010–2011 surveys, 73% of the dolphins were killed for bait, disposed of, or abandoned in entangled gillnets. The data does not fully represent the actual overall number of deaths of the Amazon river dolphins, whether accidental or intentional, because a variety of factors make it extremely complicated to record and medically examine all the carcasses. Scavenger species feed upon them and the complexity of the river currents makes it nearly impossible to locate all the carcasses. More importantly, the local fishermen do not report these deaths out of fear that legal action will be taken against them, as the Amazon river dolphin and other cetaceans are protected under the Brazilian federal law, prohibiting any takes, harassments, and kills of the species.

== Conservation ==
=== International River Dolphin Day ===
The Global Declaration for River Dolphins was signed by nine countries on 24 October 2023, a date chosen as it is known as the International River Dolphin Day. This pact is intended to promote research and cooperation between countries with river dolphin populations. It is hoped that five further countries will join.

=== Amazon and Orinoco Rivers ===
Marine biologist Fernando Trujillo co-founded the Omacha Foundation in 1993 to protect the pink river dolphins in the Amazon and Orinoco Rivers. Since 2013, Trujillo and his team have been measuring the mercury levels in river dolphins. Mercury, leached into the river through illegal gold mining processes, is harmful to both dolphins and humans.

==== Climate Change ====
As global temperatures rise, the Amazon has seen record levels of drought and river temperatures. In 2023, within just two months (September–October), 330 river dolphins were found dead in the Amazon region due to extreme drought.

=== Captivity ===
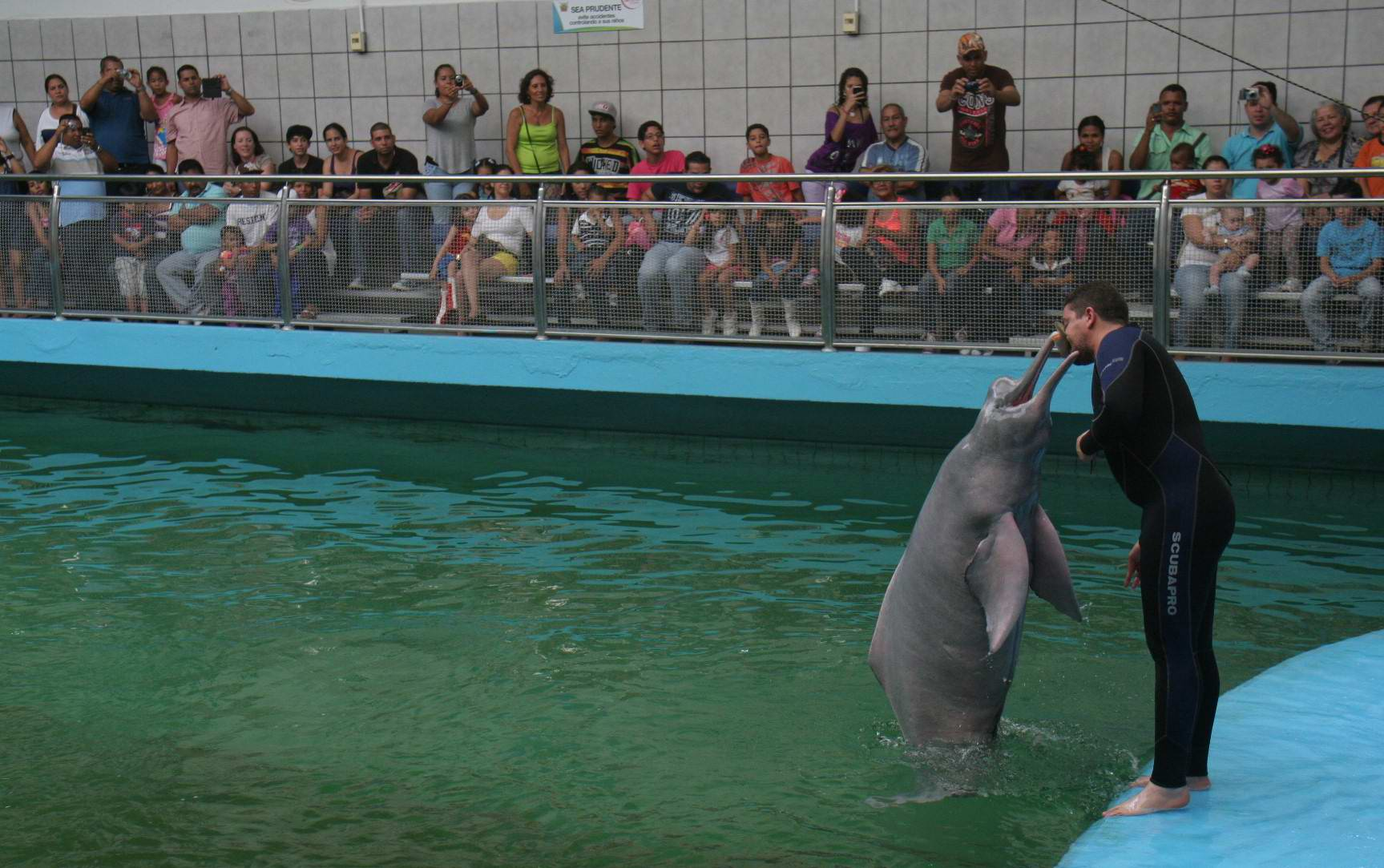
One of two trained Amazon river dolphin in the world at the Acuario de Valencia, Venezuela

A baiji conservation dolphinarium was established at the Institute of Hydrobiology (IHB) in Wuhan in 1992. This was planned as a backup to any other conservation efforts by producing an area completely protected from any threats, and where the baiji could be easily observed. The site includes an indoor and outdoor holding pool, a water filtration system, food storage and preparation facilities, research labs and a small museum. The aim is to also generate income from tourism which can be put towards the baiji plight. The pools are not very large, only kidney shaped tanks with dimensions of 82 feet (25 m) arc 23 feet (7.0 m) width and 11 feet (3.4 m) depth, 33 feet (10 m) diameter, 6.6 feet (2.0 m) deep and 39 feet (12 m) diameter, 11 feet (3.4 m) deep, and are not capable of holding many baijis at one time. Douglas Adams and Mark Carwardine documented their encounters with the endangered animals on their conservation travels for the BBC programme Last Chance to See. The book by the same name, published in 1990, included pictures of a captive specimen, a male named Qi Qi (淇淇) that lived in the Wuhan Institute of Hydrobiology dolphinarium from 1980 to July 14, 2002. Discovered by a fisherman in Dongting Lake, he became the sole resident of the Baiji Dolphinarium (白鱀豚水族馆) beside East Lake. A sexually mature female was captured in late 1995, but died after half a year in 1996 when the Shishou Tian-e-Zhou Baiji Semi-natural Reserve (石首半自然白鱀豚保护区), which had contained only finless porpoises since 1990, was flooded.

The Amazon river dolphin has historically been kept in dolphinariums. Three notable individuals included one in Acuario de Valencia in Venezuela, one in Zoologico de Guistochoca in Peru, and one in Duisburg Zoo in Germany. Several hundred were captured between the 1950s and 1970s, and were distributed in dolphinariums throughout the US, Europe, and Japan. Around 100 went to US dolphinariums, and of that, only 20 survived; the last (named Chuckles) died in Pittsburgh Zoo in 2002.

== Mythology ==
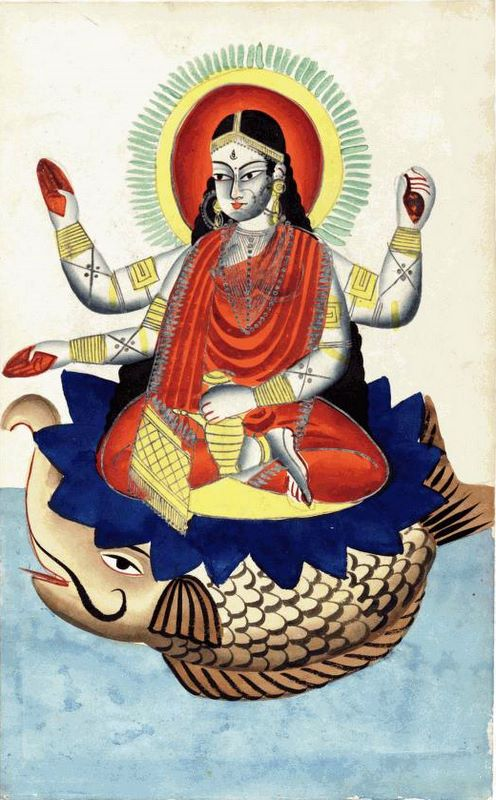
Ganga on a river dolphin

=== Asia ===
In Hindu mythology, the Ganges river dolphin is associated with Ganga, the deity of the Ganges river. The dolphin is said to be one of the creatures which heralded the goddess' descent from the heavens, and Ganga's mount, the Makara, is sometimes depicted as a dolphin.

In Chinese mythology, the baiji has many origin stories. For example, near the mouth of the Yangtze, the baiji was a princess that had lost her parents and had lived with her stepfather, whom she had longed to get away from. The stepfather wanted to trade her since she would be sold for a great sum of money, but as they were crossing the river to get to the trader, a storm rolled in. The enraged stepfather tried to take her, but she plunged herself into the river, was transformed into a dolphin before she drowned, and swam away from her abusive stepfather, who also fell in and was transformed into a porpoise.

In another story, the baiji was the daughter of a general deported from the city of Wuhan during a war who ran away while her father was in duty. Later, the general met a woman who told him how her father was a general. When he realized that she was his daughter, he threw himself into the river out of shame, and his daughter ran after him and also fell into the river. Before they were drowned, the daughter was transformed into a dolphin and the general into a porpoise.

=== South America ===
Amazon river dolphins, known by the natives as the boto, encantados or toninhas, are very prevalent in the mythology of the native South Americans. They are often characterized in mythology with superior musical ability, seductiveness and love of sex that often results in illegitimate children, and attraction to parties. Despite the fact that the Encante are said to come from a utopia full of wealth and without pain or death, the encantados crave the pleasures and hardships of human societies.

Transformation into human form is said to be rare, and usually occurs at night. The encantado will often be seen running from a festa, despite protests from the others for it to stay, and can be seen by pursuers as it hurries to the river and reverts to dolphin form. When it is under human form, it wears a hat to hide its blowhole, which does not disappear with the shapeshift.

Besides the ability to shapeshift into human form, encantados frequently wield other magical abilities, such as controlling storms, hypnotizing humans into doing their will, transforming humans into encantados, and inflicting illness, insanity, and even death. Shamans often intervene in these situations.

Kidnapping is also a common theme in such folklore. Encantados are said to be fond of abducting humans with whom they fall in love, children born of their illicit love affairs, or just about anyone near the river who can keep them company, and taking them back to the Encante. The fear of this is so great among people who live near the Amazon River that both children and adults are terrified of going near the water between dusk and dawn, or entering water alone. Some who supposedly have encountered encantados while out in their canoes have been said to have gone insane, but the creatures seem to have done little more than follow their boats and nudge them from time to time.
