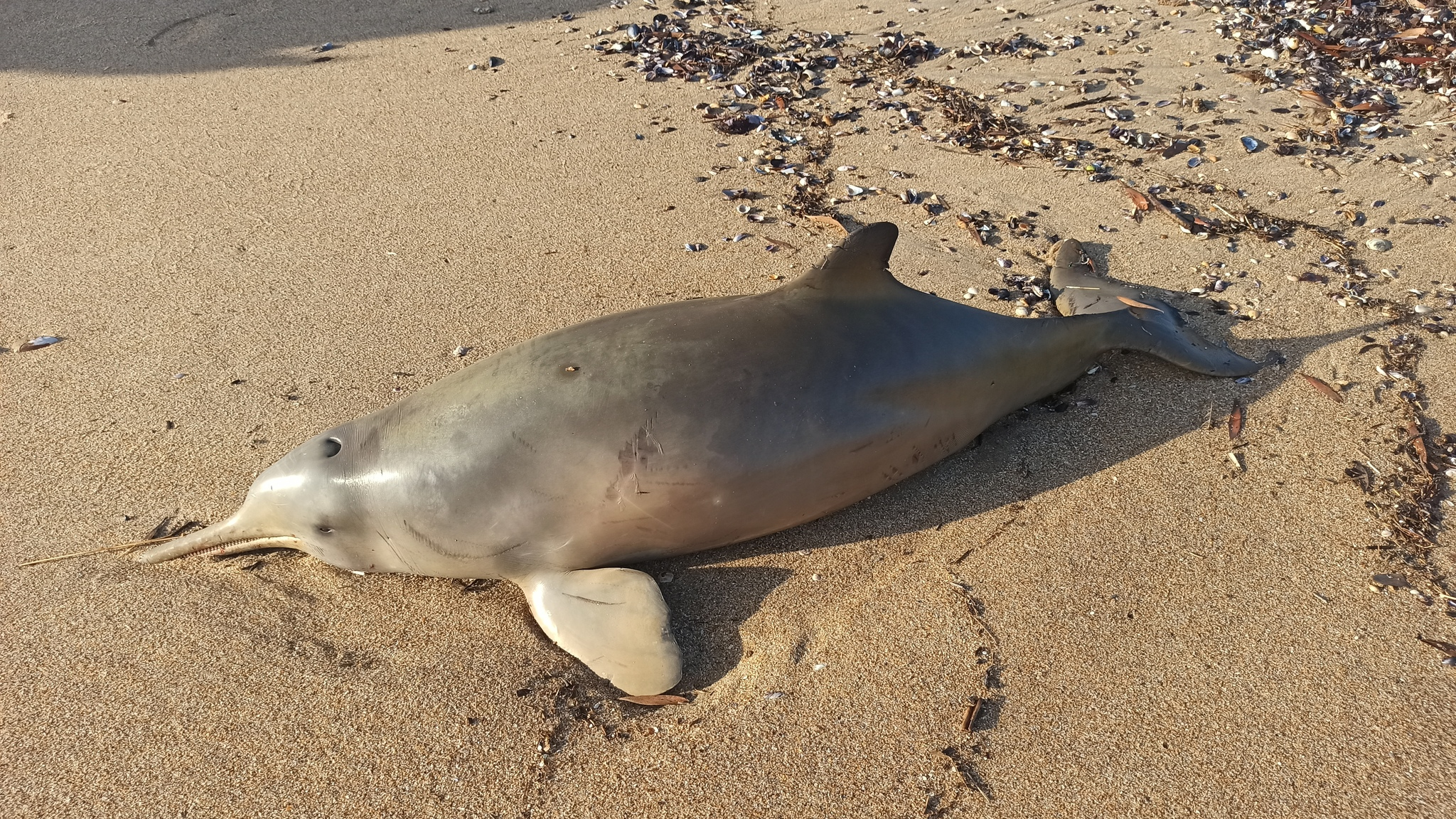
- Stranded individual
- Size compared to an average human

Conservation status
- Vulnerable (IUCN 3.1)
- CITES Appendix II

Scientific classification
- Kingdom: Animalia
- Phylum: Chordata
- Class: Mammalia
- Order: Artiodactyla
- Infraorder: Cetacea
- Family: Pontoporiidae
- Genus: Pontoporia; Gray, 1846
- Species: P. blainvillei

Binomial name
- Pontoporia blainvillei Gervais & d'Orbigny, 1844
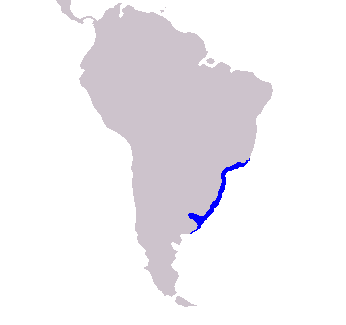
- La Plata dolphin range

= La Plata dolphin =

La Plata dolphin Temporal range: Pliocene-recent

Species of mammal

The La Plata dolphin, franciscana or toninha (Pontoporia blainvillei) is a species of river dolphin found in coastal Atlantic waters of southeastern South America. It is a member of the Inioidea group and the only one that lives in the ocean and saltwater estuaries, rather than inhabiting exclusively freshwater systems. Commercialized areas that create agricultural runoffs and industrialized zones can affect the health of the La Plata dolphin, especially in regards to their contributions of waste and pollution, which can lead to habitat degradation and poisoned food among other concerns.

== Taxonomy ==
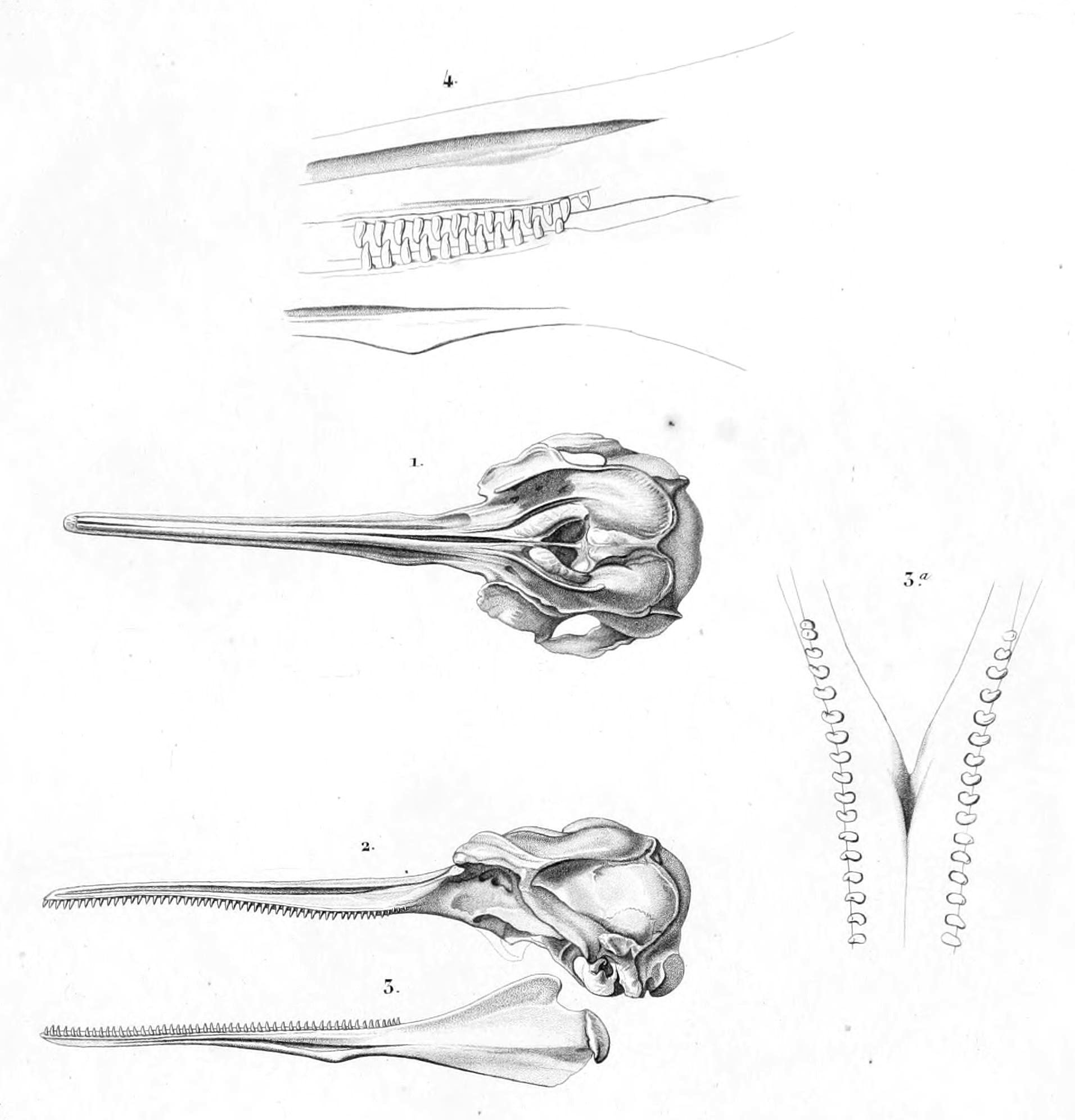
La Plata skull

The La Plata dolphin is the only species in its genus, Pontoporia, and is often placed in its own family, Pontoporiidae. It was first described by Paul Gervais and Alcide d'Orbigny in 1844 (the species epithet blainvillei commemorates the French zoologist Henri Marie Ducrotay de Blainville). The La Plata dolphin is also widely known as the Franciscana (the Argentine and Uruguayan name), a name that has been adopted internationally. Other common names are the toninha (the Brazilian name) and cachimbo.

== Description ==
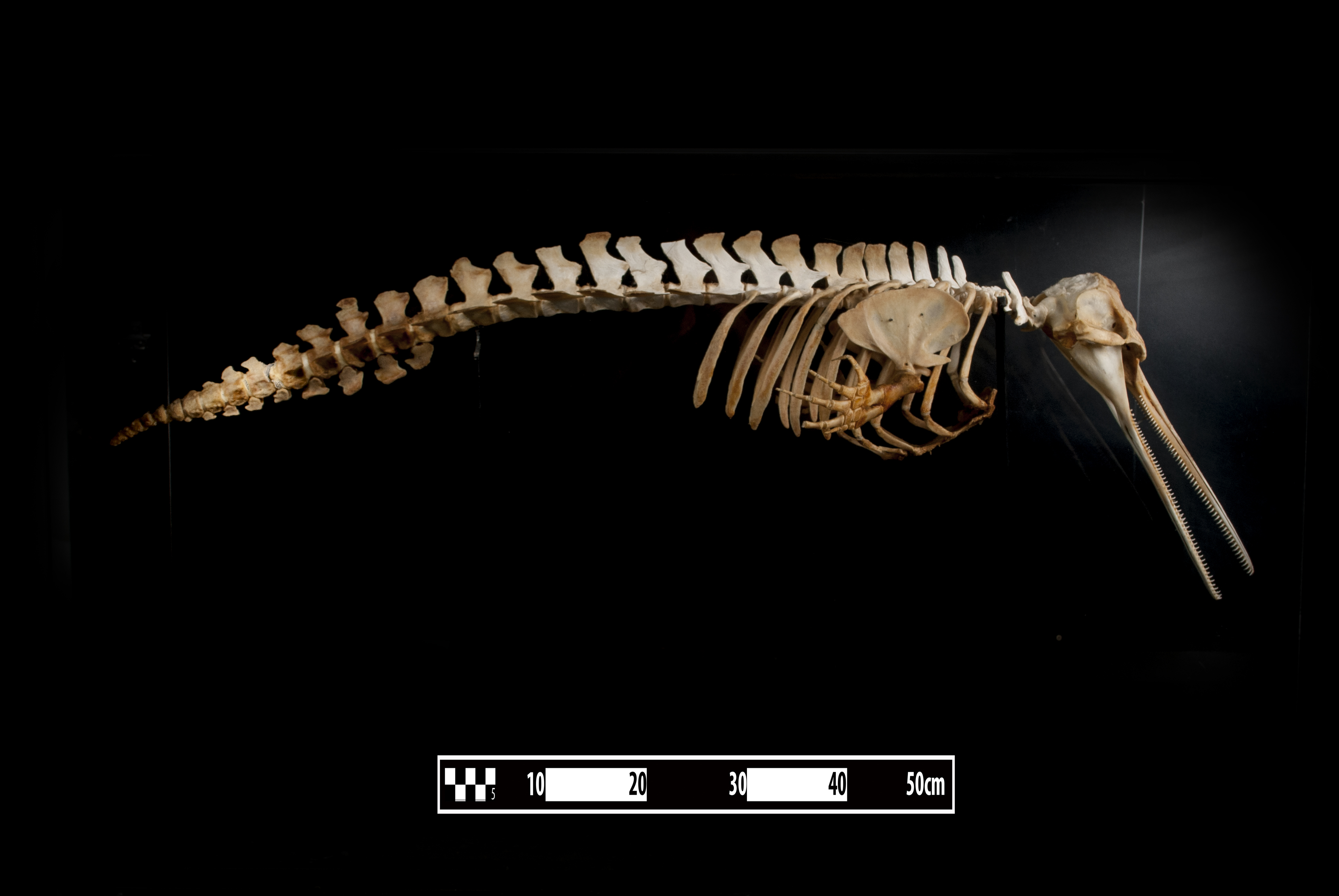
The skeleton on display at the Museum of Veterinary Anatomy, FMVZ USP

The La Plata dolphin has the longest beak (as a proportion of body size) of any extant cetacean — as much as 15% in older adults. Males grow to 1.6 metres (5.2 ft) and females to 1.8 metres (5.9 ft). The body is a greyish brown colour, with a lighter underside. The flippers are also very large in comparison with body size and are very broad, but narrow on joining the body, so are almost triangular in shape. The trailing edges are serrated. The crescent-shaped blowhole lies just in front of a crease in the neck, giving the impression that dolphin forever has its head cricked upwards. The dorsal fin has a long base and a rounded tip. The La Plata dolphin has homodont dentition with conical-shaped teeth. The number of teeth ranges from 48 to 61 on each side of its upper and lower jaw.

The La Plata dolphin weighs up to 50 kilograms (110 lb), and lives for up to 20 years. Sexual maturity is reached between two and three years. Females have a two-year reproductive cycle. Calves are 70 to 75 cm when born after a gestation of 10–11 months. Calves are weaned at a year old. Females may be giving birth by the age of five.

== Reproduction ==
The La Plata dolphin reaches sexual maturity around two to three years for both sexes, but some populations have shown as long as five years. Although it is difficult to observe La Plata dolphins, the reproductive patterns of one population of La Plata near Brazil was studied extensively. A majority of the dolphins observed were born around September to February, during the austral spring and summer. La Plata dolphin has an average gestation period of about 11 months.

Smaller testes indicate less importance of sperm competition when considering mating strategies, and La Plata dolphins generally have smaller testes. However, data reveals that the size of an individual's testes has seasonal variation which indicates their breeding season, but there is still research needed to further this observation. The size of La Plata testes in relation to their body mass may reveal that they primarily perform serial monogamy. This does not directly indicate that La Plata are purely monogamous, but that they may remain with one partner during a breeding season or a portion of that season.

There is evidence that suggests that La Plata have a reproductive cycle of two years; however, more is required to make any legitimate claims.

== Behavior and feeding ==
The animal is very inconspicuous—it moves very smoothly and slowly—and can be difficult to spot unless estuary conditions are very calm. It will commonly swim alone or in small groups. Exceptional groups as large as 15 have been seen. La Plata dolphins are bottom feeders and gut inspections have revealed they eat at least 24 different species of fish, depending on which species are most common. They will also take octopus, squid and shrimp. They are, in turn, hunted by killer whales (orcas) and several species of sharks (such as tiger sharks, sand tiger sharks, broadnose sevengill sharks, hammerhead sharks (Sphyrna), and requiem sharks Carcharhinus).

== Range and habitat ==
The La Plata dolphin is found in the coastal Atlantic waters of southeastern South America, including the Río de la Plata estuary. Its distribution ranges from the Tropic of Capricorn near Ubatuba, Brazil, south to Península Valdés, Argentina. It is the only member of the river dolphin group that lives in the ocean and saltwater estuaries, rather than freshwater. Although some members of the species do spend portions of their lives outside of river systems, many individuals live their entire lives within rivers, never venturing into the ocean proper.

The species has been observed in Miramar, Buenos Aires Province, Rio Negro Province, Bahia Rosas swimming in small groups. Their reported range is from the opening of the Doce River, Regencia, Espirito Santo, Brasil to Peninsula Valdes in Chubut Province, Argentina.

When along the Brazilian coast, the species is usually reported in depths ranging from 8 to 30 meters, and up to 35 for accidental captures. However, there are a few reports of individual further away from the shore.

== Threats ==
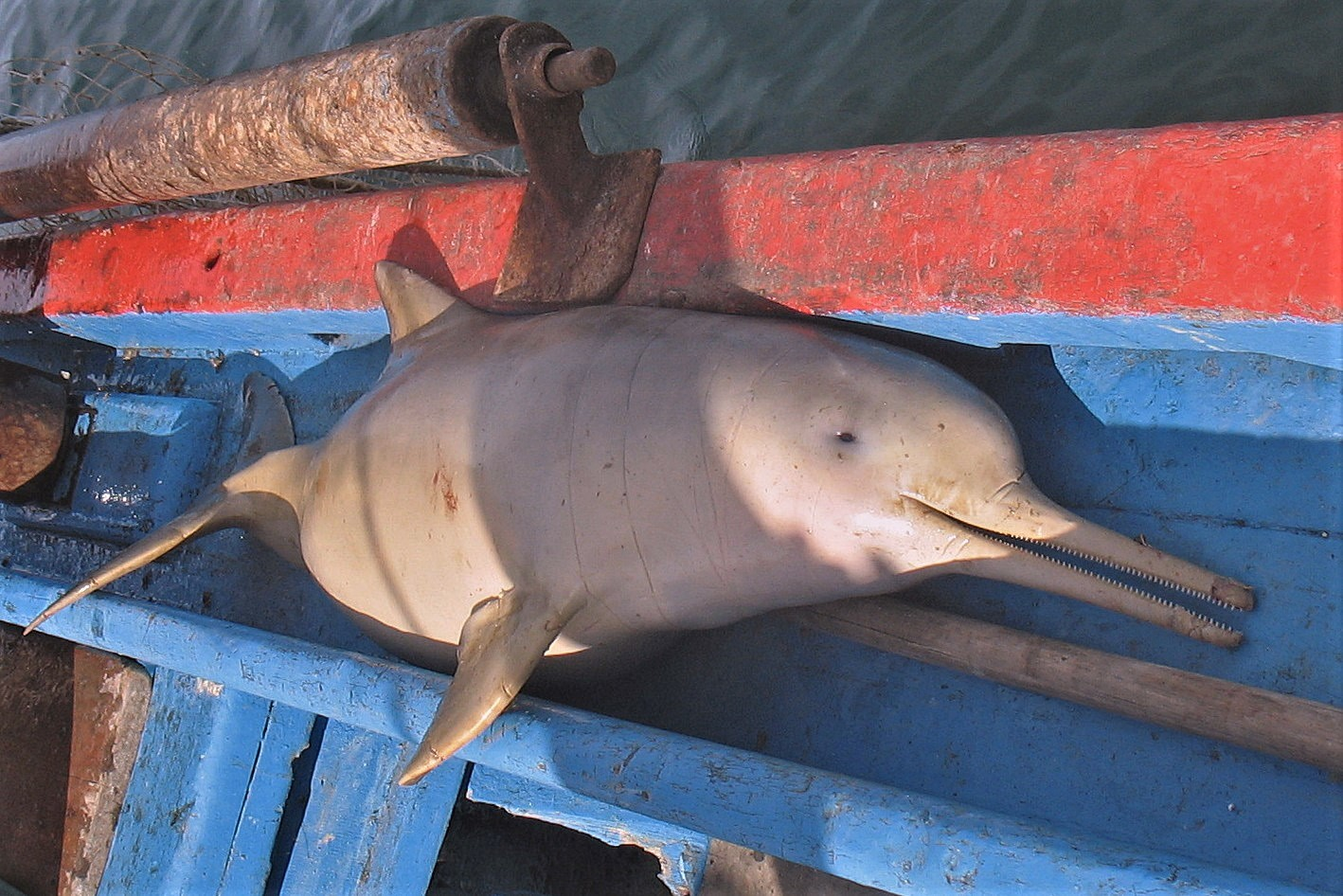
Individual captured by a fishing vessel, already dead

The La Plata dolphin is affected by factors like habitat destruction and water pollution. Plastic debris and synthetic material has been found in the stomach contents of these animals. More research is necessary to determine whether or not these factors negatively affect the health of La Plata dolphins. 90% of the population in Guanabara Bay was lost in three decades. La Plata also faces threats from fishing nets and other types of fishing gear that they get caught in while searching for prey.

Commercialized areas often have agricultural runoff or industrial zones that are harmful to the species's health. Waste and pollution from these areas lead to habitat degradation and toxic chemicals in fish that dolphins feed on.

Since the La Plata dolphin is a small mammal and their habitat is regularly hunted by sharks and killer whales, they are generally quiet in nature and inhabit shallow coastal waters.

== Conservation ==
The La Plata dolphin is listed as "Vulnerable" in the IUCN Red List of Threatened Species. However, the Franciscana is a particular conservation concern because of its restricted distribution and vulnerability to incidental capture in fishing gear. Large numbers are killed in gillnets. Although the largest documented catches in the 1970s were in Uruguay, catches in recent decades have also been high in southern Brazil and Argentina. Scientists from all three countries have voiced their concerns, and asked for international assistance in highlighting the plight of the dolphin (see Reeves et al., pg. 53).

The species is listed on Appendix I and Appendix II of the Convention on the Conservation of Migratory Species of Wild Animals (CMS). It is listed on Appendix I as this species has been categorized as being in danger of extinction throughout all or a significant proportion of its range. CMS Parties strive towards strictly protecting these animals, conserving or restoring the places where they live, mitigating obstacles to migration and controlling other factors that might endanger them. It is listed on Appendix II as it has an unfavourable conservation status or would benefit significantly from international co-operation organised by tailored agreements.

A young La Plata dolphin was rescued in 2011 off Montevideo, Uruguay. In February 2016 a young dolphin died on the beach of Santa Teresita, Argentina. Reports circulated internationally that the dolphin's death resulted after being passed around by a crowd who were posing for selfies with it. However, an interview by the photographer of the images, Hernan Coria, contradicted such claim.

== See also ==
- List of cetaceans
- La Plata River environmental issues
