= Giorgio Dal Piaz =

Italian geologist

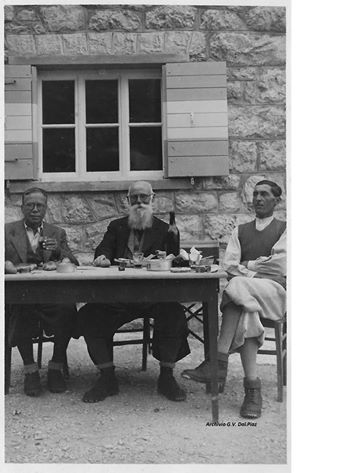
Dal Piaz (centre) in 1940

Giorgio Dal Piaz (29 March 1872 – 22 April 1962) was an Italian geologist and specialist in the Alps. He served as a professor of geology at the University of Padua.

Dal Piaz was born at Feltre to Basilio and Corona D'Alberto. After studying pharmacy he worked for a while before going to Padua to study natural sciences and graduated in 1897. He then worked as an assistant to Giovanni Omboni. In 1909 he joined the University of Catania and then went to Padua where he succeeded Omboni. During World War I he was drafted to command the Fourth Army. He signed the Manifesto of the Anti-Fascist Intellectuals in 1925.

Dal Piaz's contributions to geology where through his studies on stratigraphy of the Feltrine alps and through his teaching. He studied isostatic elevation in the Venetian Prealps. His paleontological collections are held at the Geological Institute of the University of Padua. He retired in 1942 and died at Padua.

A refuge and a school are named in his memory as also a prize from the Italian Geological Society. One of his sons, Giambattista (1904-1995), also became a geologist and served in the same position from 1943 to 1974. Giambattista's son Giorgio Vittorio Dal Piaz also became a geologist.
