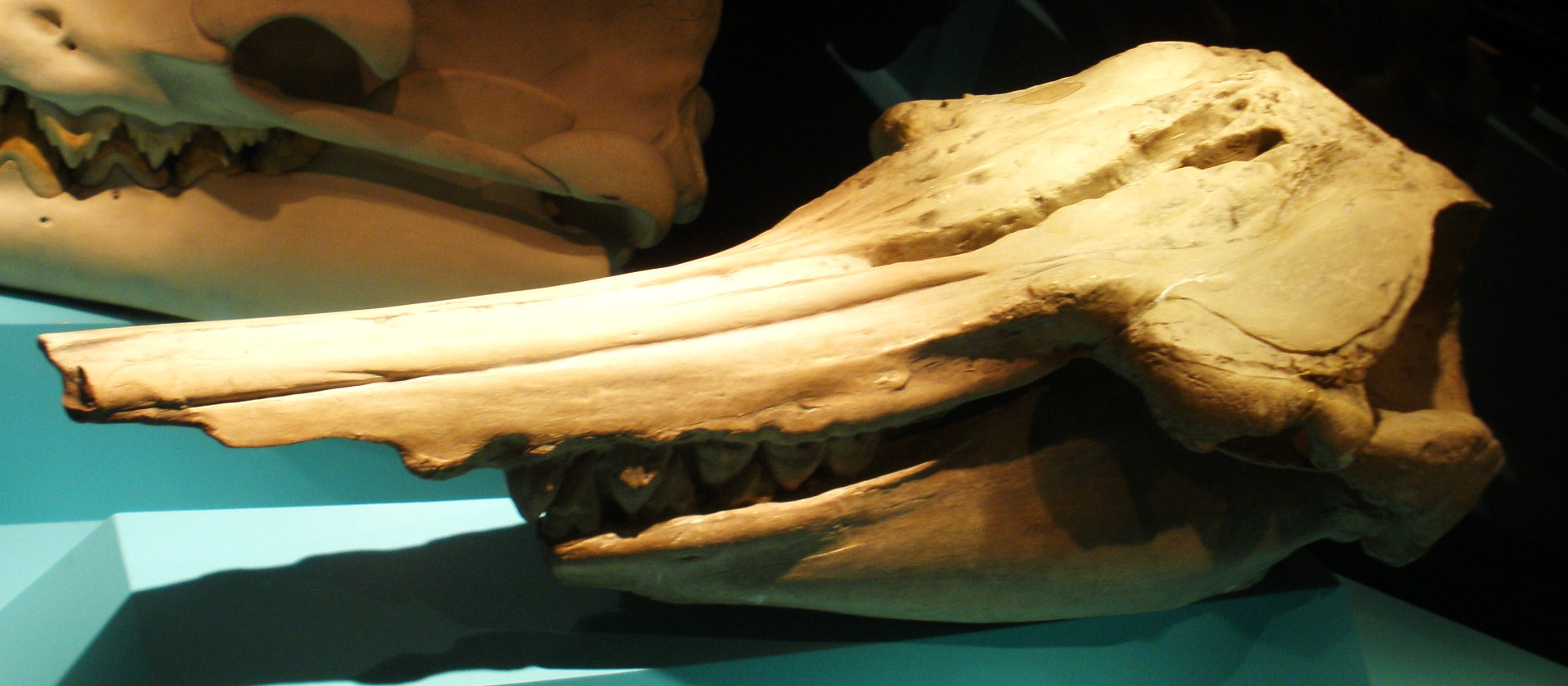
- Skull of S. bariensis at the Museum of Natural Sciences in Brussels.

Scientific classification
- Kingdom: Animalia
- Phylum: Chordata
- Class: Mammalia
- Order: Artiodactyla
- Infraorder: Cetacea
- Superfamily: Platanistoidea
- Family: †Squalodontidae; Brandt, 1873
- Genus: †Squalodon; Grateloup, 1840

Type species
- †Squalodon grateloupii von Meyer, 1843

Species
- †S. antverpiensis (van Beneden, 1861) †S. bariensis (Jourdan, 1861) †S. barbarus (Mchedlidze and Aslanova, 1968) †S. calvertensis (Kellogg, 1923) †S. whitmorei (Dooley, 2005) †S. catulli (Molin, 1859)

= Squalodon =

Squalodon Temporal range: Oligocene–Miocene

Extinct genus of mammals

Squalodon is an extinct genus of whales of the Oligocene and Miocene epochs, belonging to the family Squalodontidae. Named by Jean-Pierre Sylvestre de Grateloup in 1840, it was originally believed to be an iguanodontid dinosaur but has since been reclassified. The name Squalodon comes from Squalus, a genus of shark. As a result, its name means "shark tooth". It was once thought to be related to the genus Platanista (the Ganges river dolphin and Indus river dolphin). However, it is a primitive odontocete with heterodont dentition and no modern descendants.

== Description ==
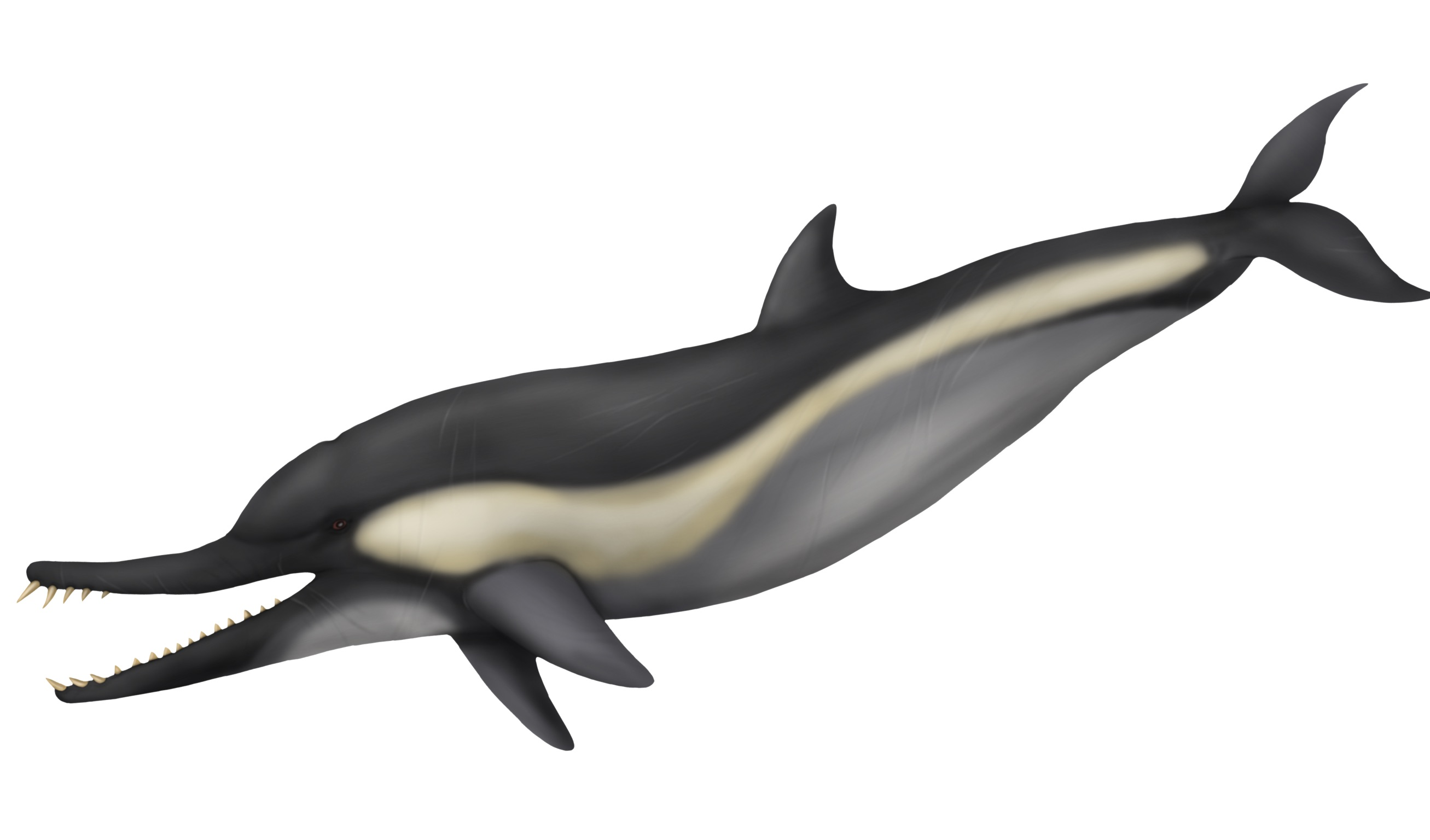
Reconstruction of S. calvertensis

Species of Squalodon are odontocetes that lived during the late Oligocene into the middle Miocene, about 28 to 15 million years ago. The genus Squalodon belongs to the order Odontoceti, the toothed whales. Their name is derived from the term Squalus because their cheek teeth were thought to resemble the teeth of a Squalus shark. The largest species, Squalodon whitmorei, reached up to 5.5 meters in length. The unique-looking squalodontids were likely distributed throughout the world in warm waters during the Oligocene and Miocene. Squalodontidae became extinct in the middle of the Miocene, leaving no descendants. Hypotheses of why this family lead to extinction have to deal with competition of other groups of dolphins as well as climate change.

These whales are characterized by both ancestral and modern features. Their teeth are the most evident ancestral feature. At this time in history other toothed whales were evolving simple conical teeth while Squalodontidae retained their primitive dentition that their ancestors (the archaeocetes) had developed. Today living odontocetes have little variation in their teeth. Squalodontids' teeth are much more complex: they are widely spaced apart; their cheek teeth are triangular and serrated for grasping and cutting. Due to the efficiency of their primitive dentition squalodontids could have a diverse variety of prey. Another ancestral quality of the Squalodontidae is their necks. Squalodontid necks are more compressed than their ancestors, the Archaeoceti. Compared to toothed whales at that time, the squalodontids were likely more mobile. Paleontologists also believe that the dorsal fins were reduced but larger than that of the ancestors. Shark toothed whales also possess many modern features. Their crania were well compressed, their rostrums were telescoped outward, and their skulls show proof of the origin of echolocation. In S. grateloupii, the rostrum made up more than 60% of the total length of its skull.

== Fossil record and classification ==
Fossils of this genus are identified mainly by the teeth but several different species have been named based on skull characteristics and size (the biggest being S. whitmorei). Most of the fossil record consists of teeth. These odontocete fossils have been discovered in Europe, eastern North America, New Zealand, and Argentina. Because isolated teeth are insufficient for species identification, most specimens lacking the skull can only be identified to genus. The fossils of squalodontids indicate that this species is more closely related to endangered species of dolphins and not to most of the living dolphins today.

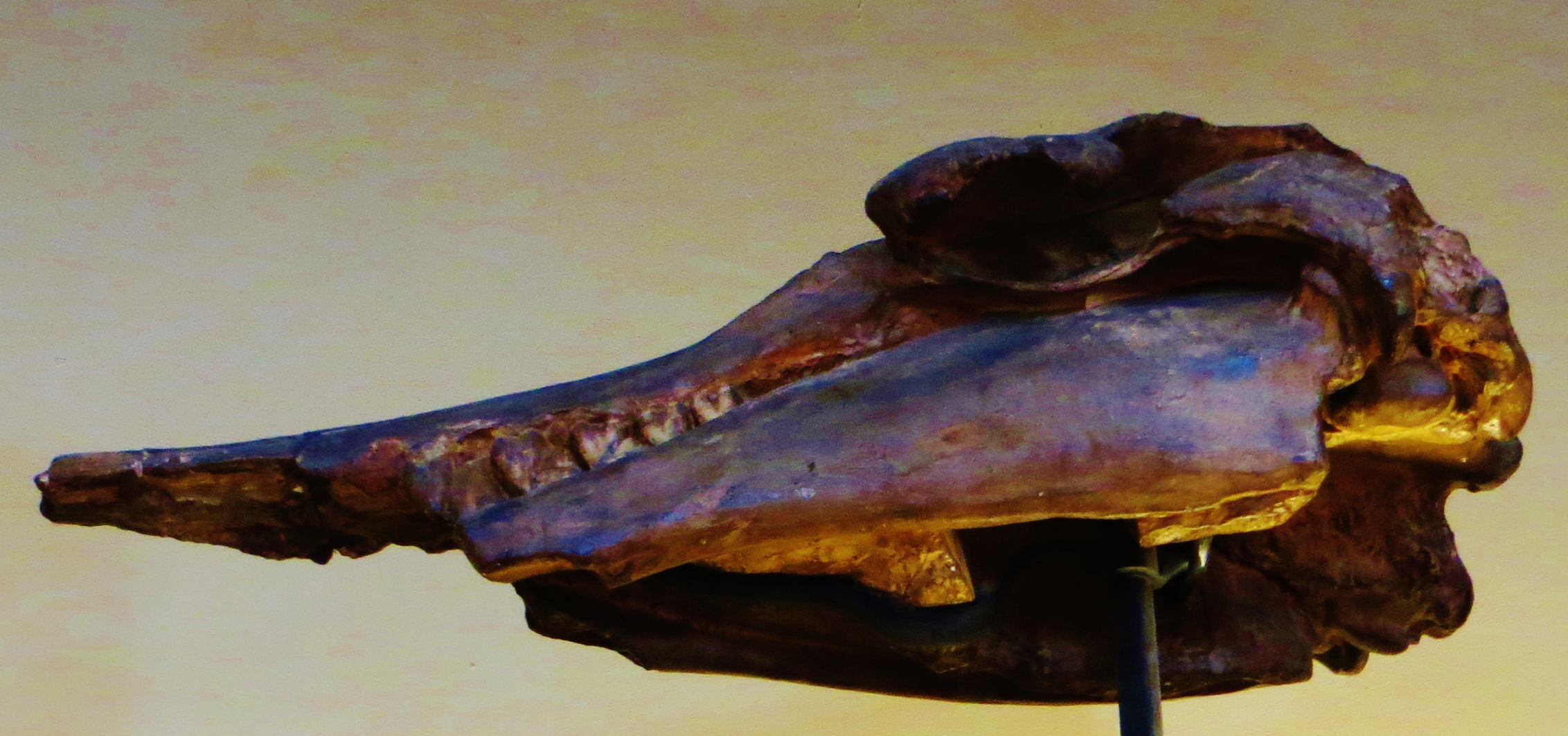
S. bariensis skull

The systematic placement of Squalodon within Odontoceti was long unclear. For a long time, it was thought to be close of the ancestry of modern dolphins and porpoise. Many of the fresh-water dolphins are differentiated phylogenetically very well, while the argument of some of the species has been going on for more than a century. The taxon is characterized during the Oligocene and Miocene in which heterodont teeth are standard amongst the family. Some modern features of the scapula, however, contradict with current phylogenetic relationships. Squalodontids were believed to be the last common ancestor of the odontocetes until 1984. Muizon came to the conclusion that rather than to any of the living species this family is closer related to the endangered species. Therefore, the ancestry of today's dolphins has little to do with the squalodontids.

== Paleobiology ==
Squalodon was a predator. Its pointed, long, and protruding teeth allowed it to catch slippery and fast prey. With these teeth, it preyed on small seabirds, marine mammals, fish, and cephalopods. However, due to the skull features of its fish-eating ancestors, it was unsuited for hunting prey larger than itself, such as baleen whales. Other predatory whales orca, and macroraptorial sperm whale is in contrast to.

== Species ==
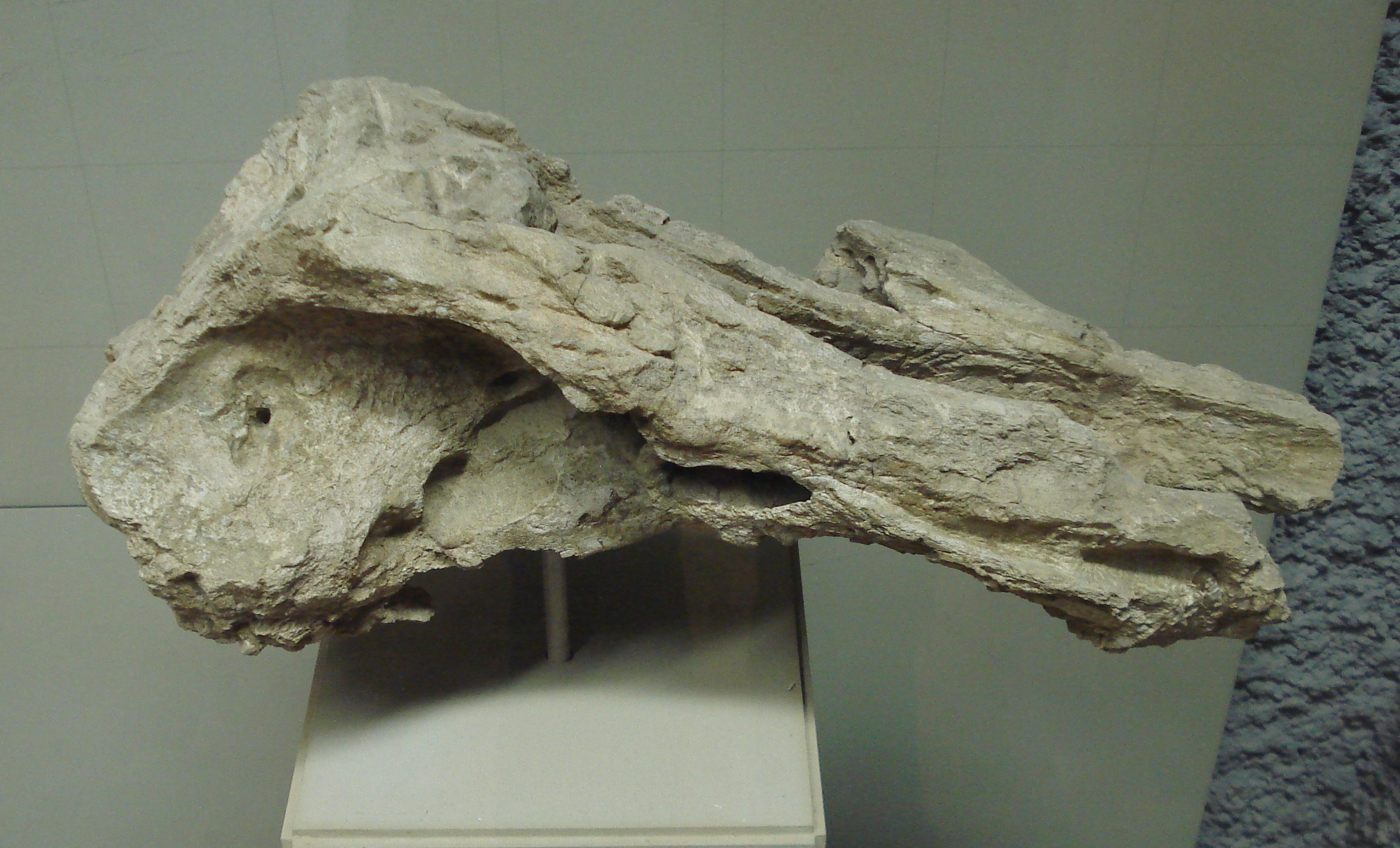
Partial skull

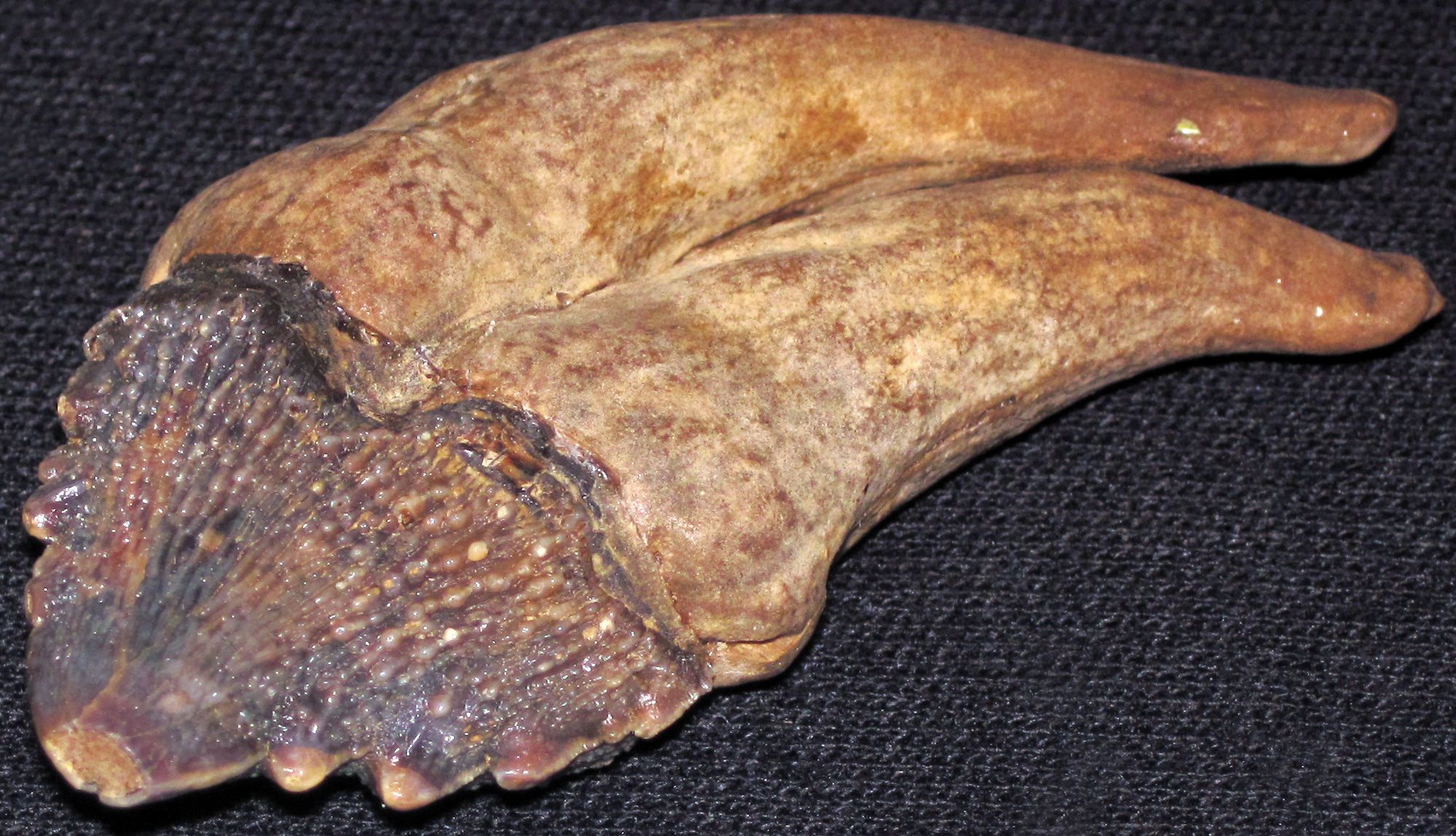
Tooth

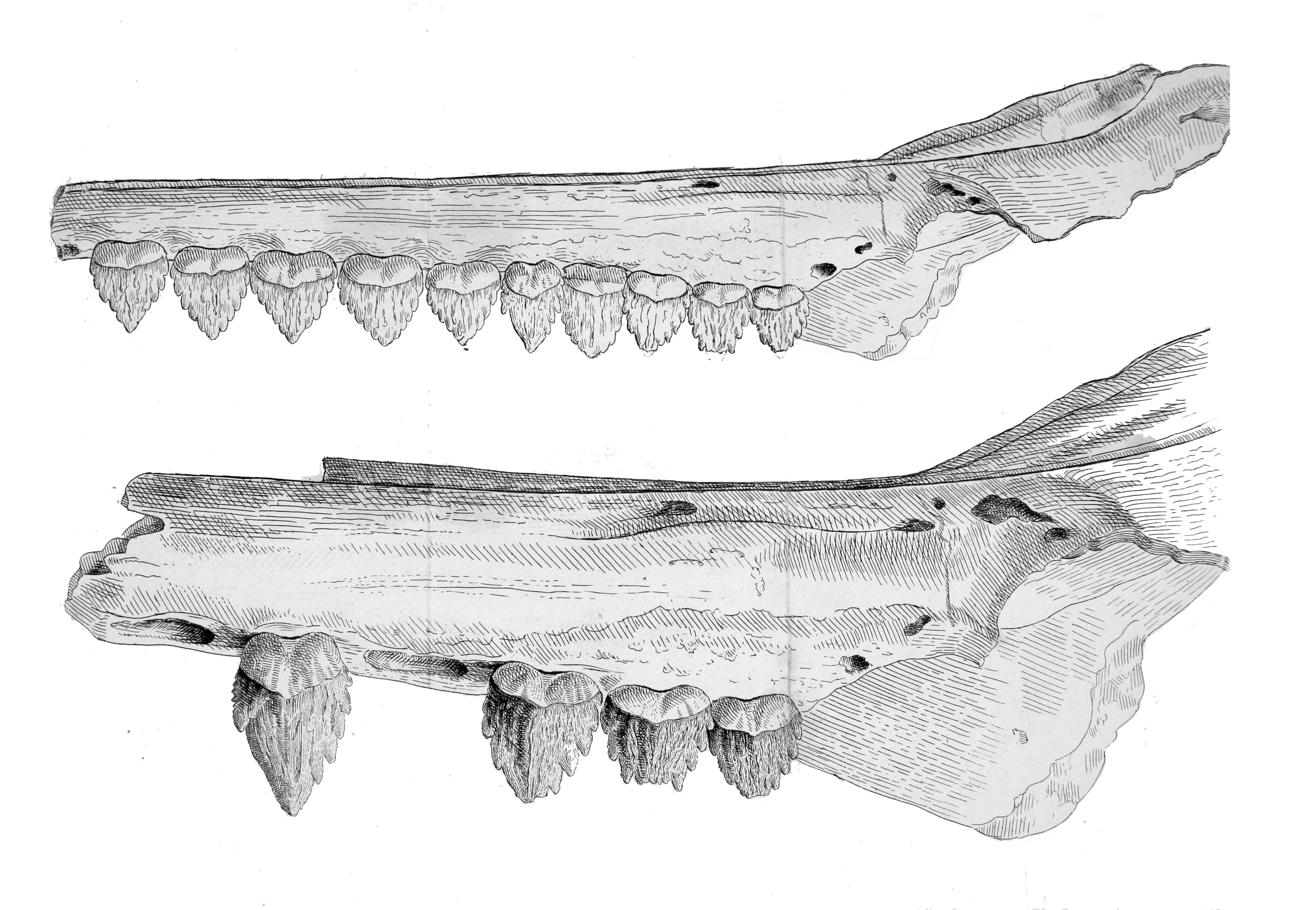
1840 illustration

As the type genus of Squalodontidae, Squalodon has become a repository for various squalodontids or even taxa that were once thought to belong to Squalodontidae. However, there has been no revision of Squalodon.

=== Species currently recognized as valid ===
- Squalodon grateloupii Meyer, 1843 (type species)
- Squalodon antverpiensis van Beneden, 1861
- Squalodon barbarus Mchedlidze and Aslanova 1968
- Squalodon calvertensis Kellogg 1923
- Squalodon whitmorei Dooley 2005
- Squalodon catulli Molin 1859

=== Questionably or originally assigned to Squalodon ===
- Arionus servatus Meyer, 1841 = Squalodon meyeri Brandt, 1873
- Pachyodon mirabilis Meyer, 1838
- Rhytisodon tuberculatus Costa, 1852
- Smilocamptus burgueti Gervais, 1859
- Phocodon melitensis (Blainville, 1840) = Phoca melitensis Blainville, 1840 = Phocodon scillae Agassiz, 1841
- "Squalodon" kelloggi Rothausen, 1968
- Squalodon bariensis Jourdan 1861
- Squalodon bellunensis Dal Piaz, 1901
- Squalodon peregrinus Dal Piaz, 1971
- Squalodon imperator Cigala-Fulgosi & Pilleri, 1985
- Squalodon gambierensisGlaessner 1955

== See also ==
- Evolution of cetaceans
- Toothed whale
