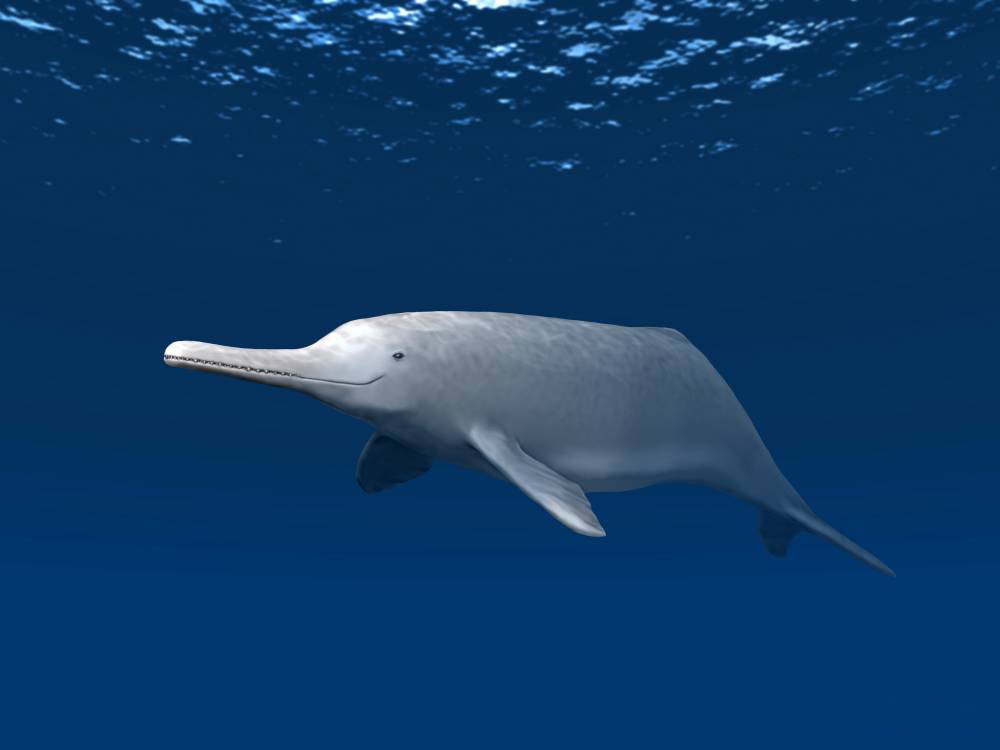
- Artistic reconstruction

Scientific classification
- Kingdom: Animalia
- Phylum: Chordata
- Class: Mammalia
- Order: Artiodactyla
- Infraorder: Cetacea
- Superfamily: Platanistoidea
- Family: †Allodelphinidae
- Genus: †Arktocara; Boersma and Pyenson, 2016
- Species: †A. yakataga

Binomial name
- †Arktocara yakataga Boersma and Pyenson, 2016

= Arktocara =

Arktocara Temporal range: Oligocene, 29–24 Ma

Extinct genus of mammals

Arktocara is an extinct genus of river dolphin from the Oligocene epoch of Alaska, containing one species, A. yakataga. Having been discovered in 25-million-year-old strata near the 60th parallel north, it is perhaps the oldest-known crown of the toothed whales and the northmost river dolphin discovered. It was a member of the now-extinct family Allodelphinidae, along with the genera Allodelphis, Goedertius, Ninjadelphis, and Zarhinocetus. It measured approximately 2.26 or 2.28 meters (7.4 or 7.5 ft), comparable to its closest living relative, the South Asian river dolphin, which measures 2.4 meters (7.9 ft). However, the animal probably had an elongated beak and neck, so it may have been longer. The animal is known only from a partially preserved skull. Its ecology may have been similar to the modern-day Dall's porpoise, and it may have competed with contemporaneous delphinoids. Its remains were found in the Poul Creek Formation, which has also yielded several mollusk species.

== Taxonomy ==
The type specimen, the only specimen, of Arktocara yakataga, an incomplete skull, was collected by geologist Donald J. Miller in 1951 in the Poul Creek Formation, who was mapping the Yakataga District, from where the species name yakataga derives from, on behalf of the United States Geological Survey (USGS). The genus name Arktocara derives from Ancient Greek arktos (north) and cara (face), translating to "the face of the north". "Yakataga" translates to "canoe road" in the Tlingit language, which is apparently a reference to the reefs which form a canoe passage to a village. Arktocara was later described 65 years after the collection of the skull (labelled as specimen USNM 214830) by Smithsonian paleontologists Alexandra Boersma and Nicholas Pyenson in 2016, being recognized as a new species.

Platanistoidea

- - Other toothed whales
  - - †Microcetus hectori
    - †Waipatia maerewhenua
    - - †Otekaikea huata
      - †Otekaikea marplesi
  - - †Squalodelphis fabianii
    - - †Goedertius oregonensis
      - †Zarhinocetus errabundus
      - - †Allodelphis pratti
        - †Arktocara yakataga
    - - - †Notocetus vanbenedeni
        - †Phocageneus venustus
      - - Platanista gangetica (South Asian river dolphin)
        - - †Pomatodelphis inaequalis
          - †Zarhachis flagellator

Relationships of Arktocara within Platanistoidea

Blue = Allodelphinidae

Arktocara was a river dolphin of the superfamily Platanistoidea, and the extinct family Allodelphinidae. The sole surviving member of Platanistoidea is the South Asian river dolphin (Platanista gangetica) which inhabits the tropics, making it its closest living relative. Allodelphinidae also included the genera Allodelphis, Goedertius, Ninjadelphis, and Zarhinocetus. Its discovery further reinforces the theory that the Platanistoidea river dolphins originated in the oceans. Of the characteristics it shared with other platanistoids was a cylindrical projection of the periotic bone in the ear, deeply grooved rostral sutures on the beak, the widening of the cranium, a depression on the roof of the orbit in the eye socket, a smaller exposed palatine bone in the roof of the mouth, an elongated and convex spine in the tympanic bulla of the ear, single rooted back-teeth, and more than 25 teeth.

== Description ==
Arktocara was around 2.26 or 2.28 meters (7.4 or 7.5 ft) in length, based on the distance from cheekbone to cheekbone, and it may have had a similar size to the modern-day South Asian river dolphin, which is 2.4 meters (7.9 ft) in length and 85 kilograms (187 lb) in weight. Based on other allodelphinids, it probably had a long beak; and it also had a long neck, as identified by the elongated, unfused cervical vertebrae in the neck. This is unusual in other cetaceans which generally have a short neck with short and fused cervical vertebrae. This elongated neck may have made it longer than the estimated size.

Unlike other platanistoids, Arktocara had a sagittal crest, and its frontal sinuses were positioned behind the nasals. The nostrils were oriented vertically, and the premaxilla formed a rectangular plateau surrounding them. The nostrils were perhaps 1.9 by 1.6–2.1 centimeters (0.75 by 0.63–0.83 in). The lacrimal bone in the eye socket wrapped around the outer edge of the brow ridge and was fused to the cheek bones. It further differed from other platanistoids in that it had a smaller process of the squamosal, that is, a projection from its skull. The frontonasal suture between the eyes on the brow ridge, which separates the frontal bone from the nasal bone, was U-shaped. The sutures indicate that the specimen was an adult. It lacked on the upper side of its head a condyloid fossa, a depression between the head and the neck; and had a symmetrical vertex, the upper part of the head. Also contrary to other platanistoids, Arktocara lacked the thin plate which extended from the hard palate in the roof of the mouth and attached to the greater wing of sphenoid bone in the ear. It lacked a maxillary crest, a bony projection from the maxillary and palatine bones in the roof of the mouth that runs along the nasal septum which separates the two nostrils. It did not have a large tympanosquamosal recess, which in cetaceans receives an air-filled sinus originating from the middle ear. The groove for the mandibular branch nerve wrapped around the sides of the pterygoid fossa, which is located behind the eyes laterally on the sphenoid bone.

Different views of the skull
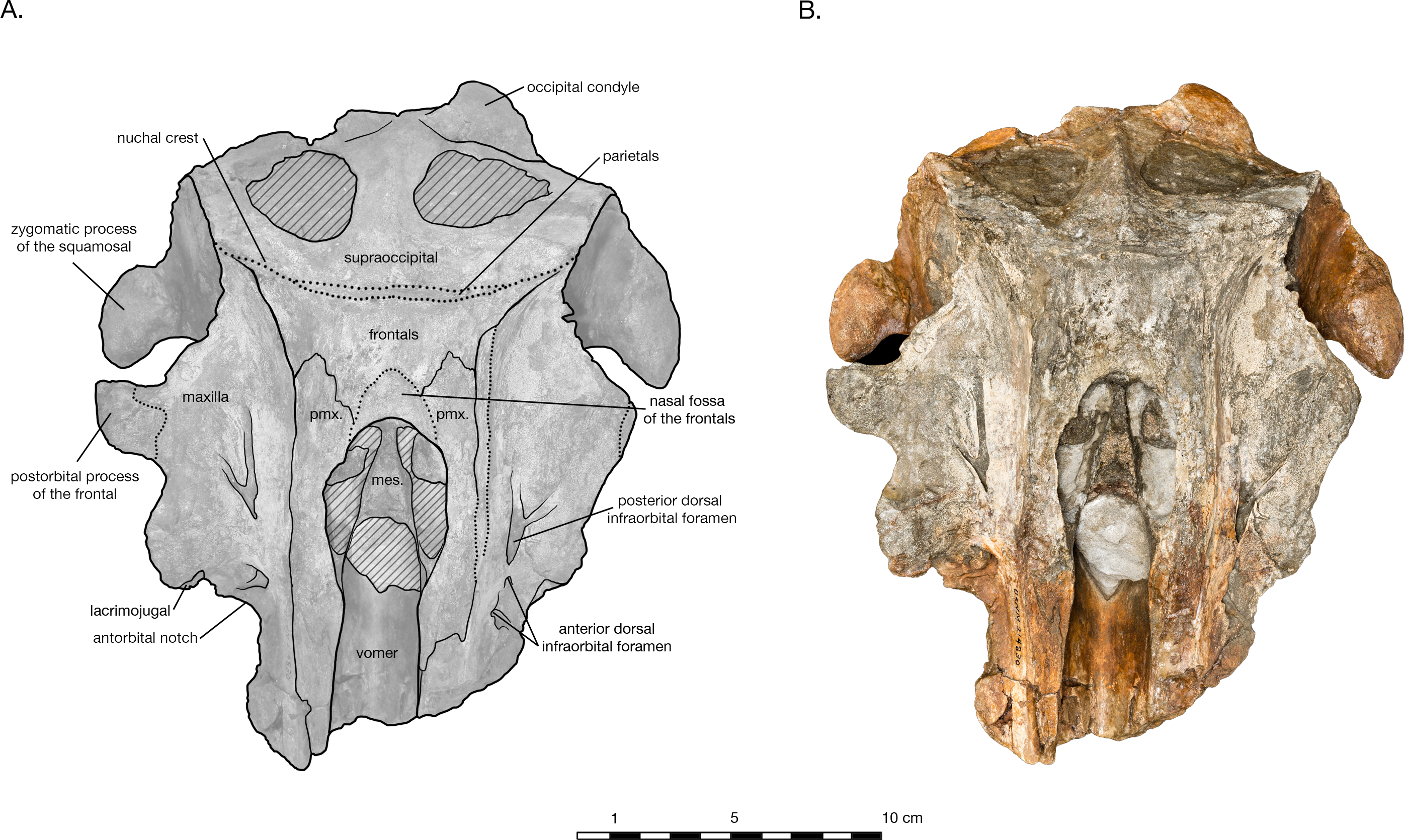
Top view

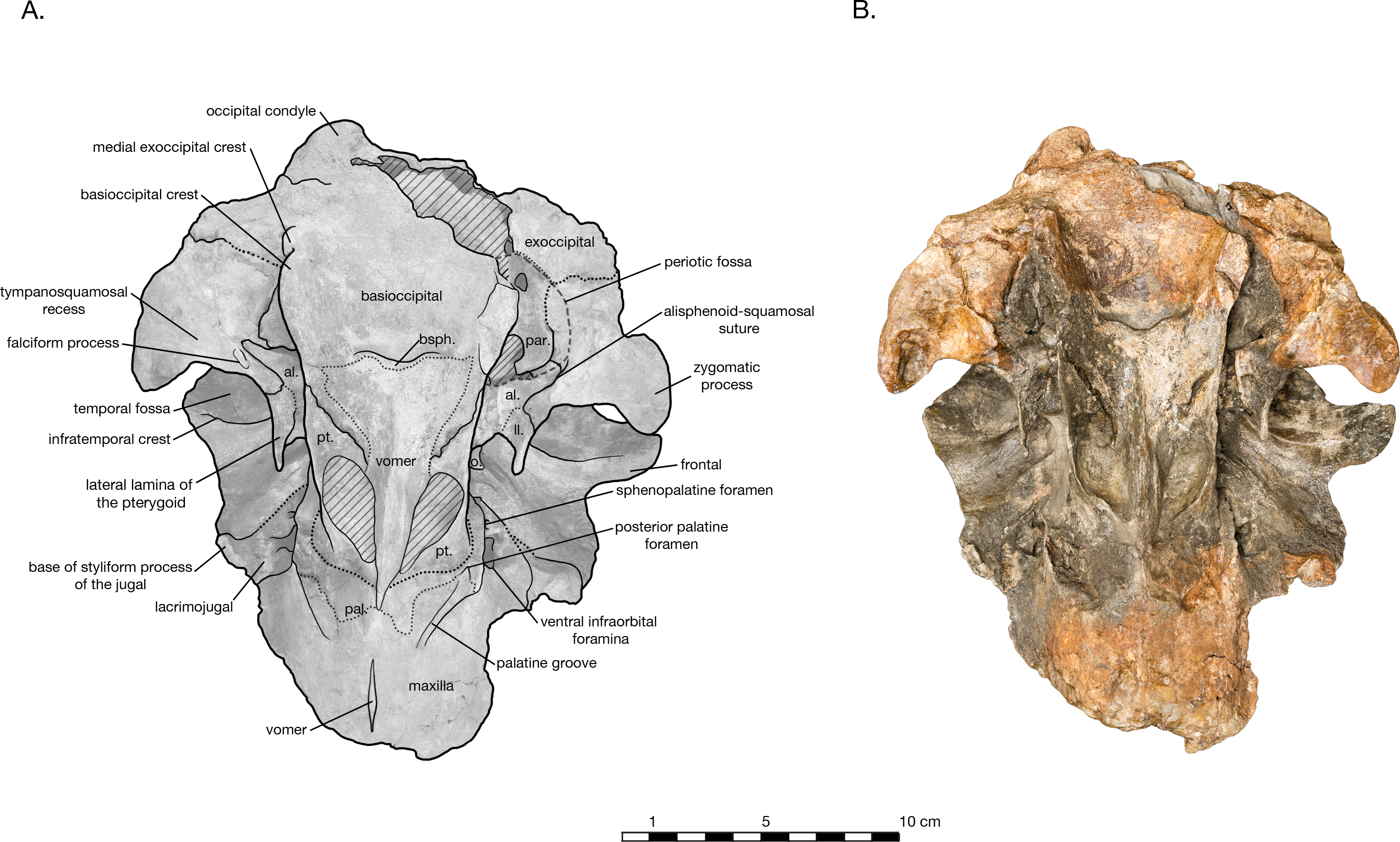
Underside view

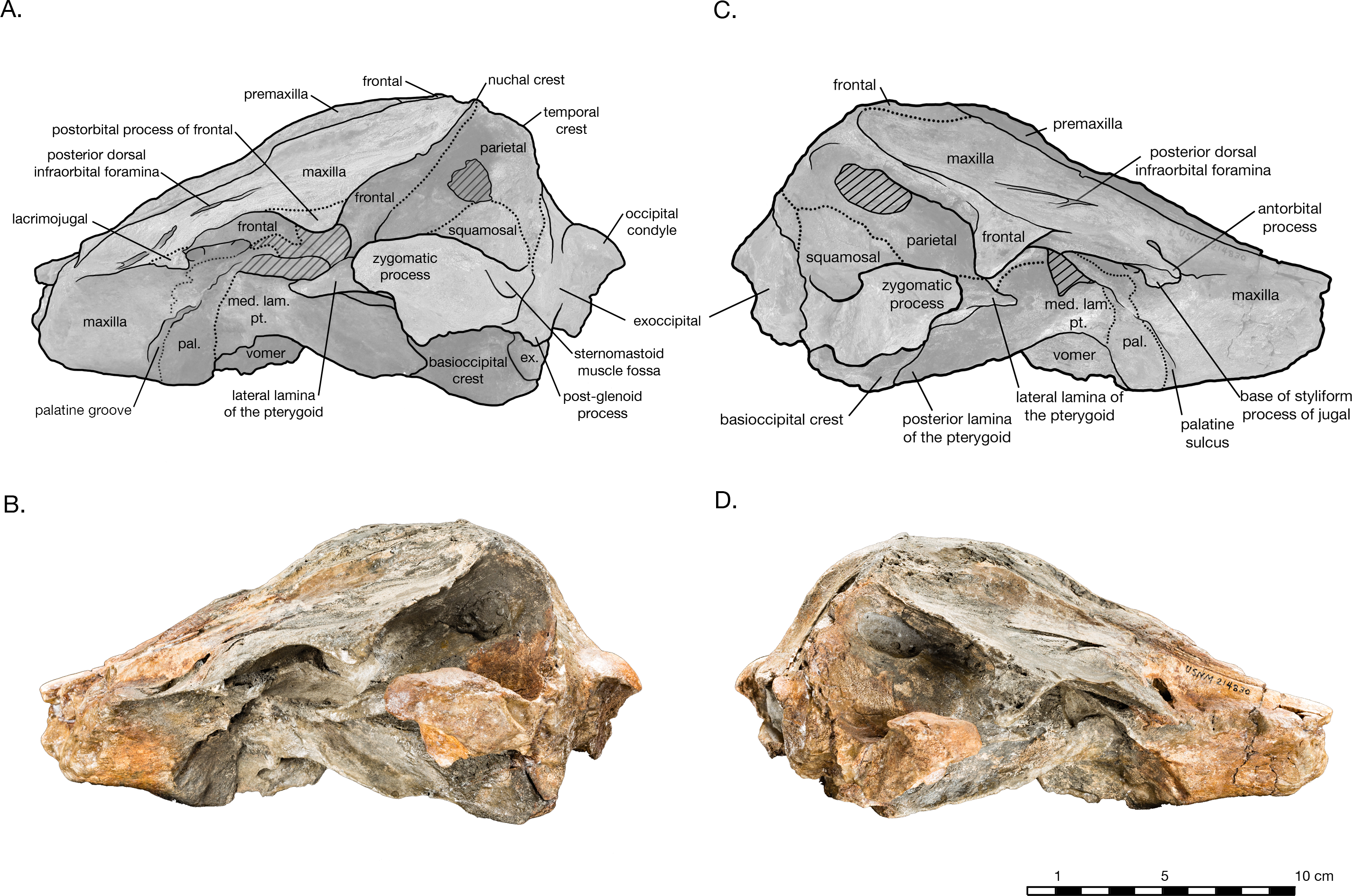
Side views

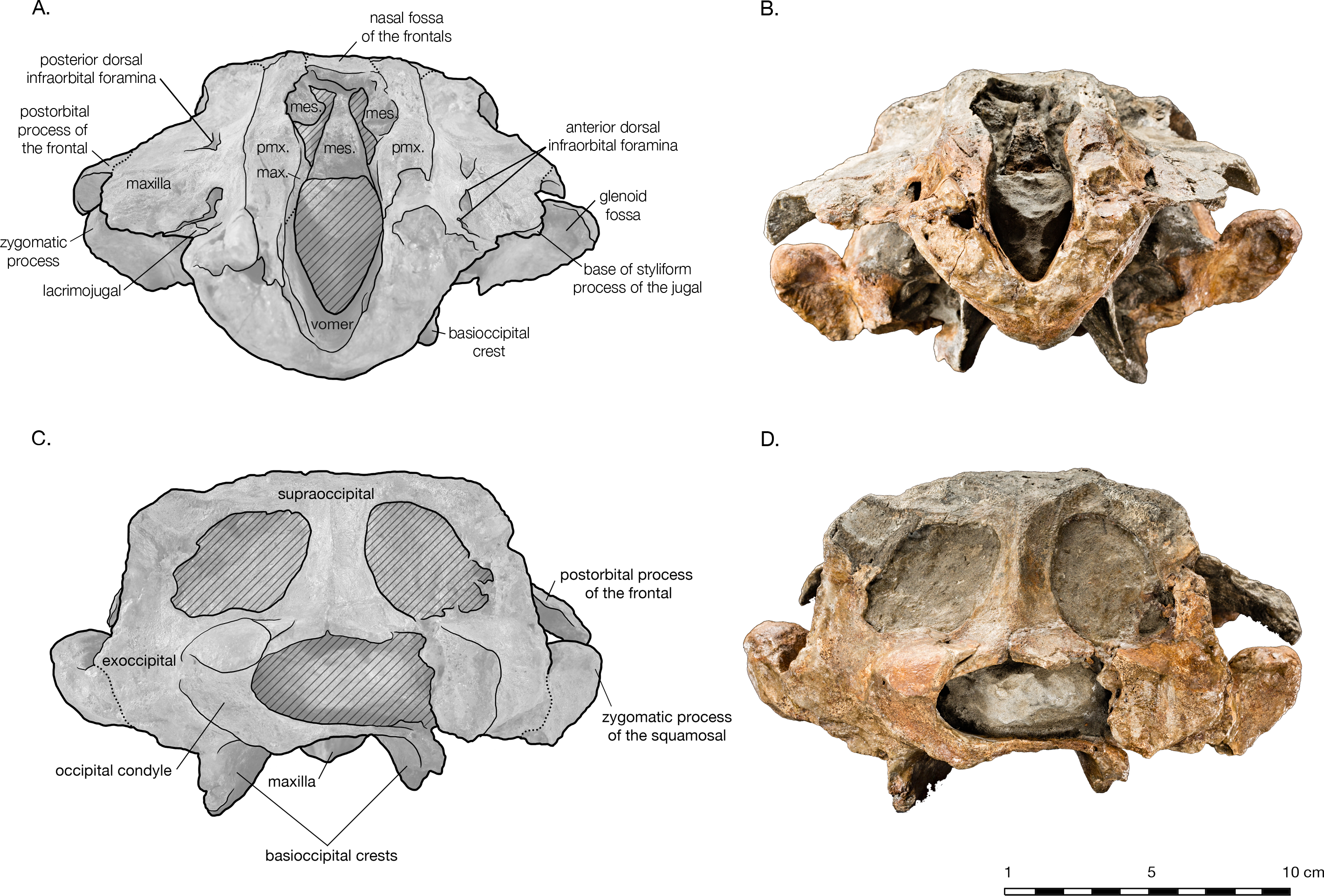
Front and back views

== Paleobiology ==
Despite being labelled as a river dolphin, Arktocara, much like other ancient platanistoids, was likely a coastal, ocean-going cetacean. Its lifestyle and diet is speculated to have been similar to the modern-day Dall's porpoise (Phocoenoides dalli), which is an opportunistic twilight-to-surface predator of soft-bodied fish and squid. Paleontologists Ewan Fordyce and Christian de Muizon speculated in 2001 that, since the modern-day platanistoid, the South Asian river dolphin, inhabits the rivers, ancient platanistoids, such as Arktocara, faced some competition from other dolphins of the superfamily Delphinoidea, and were eventually outcompeted in marine environments. However, this theory has not been properly explored yet.

== Paleoecology ==
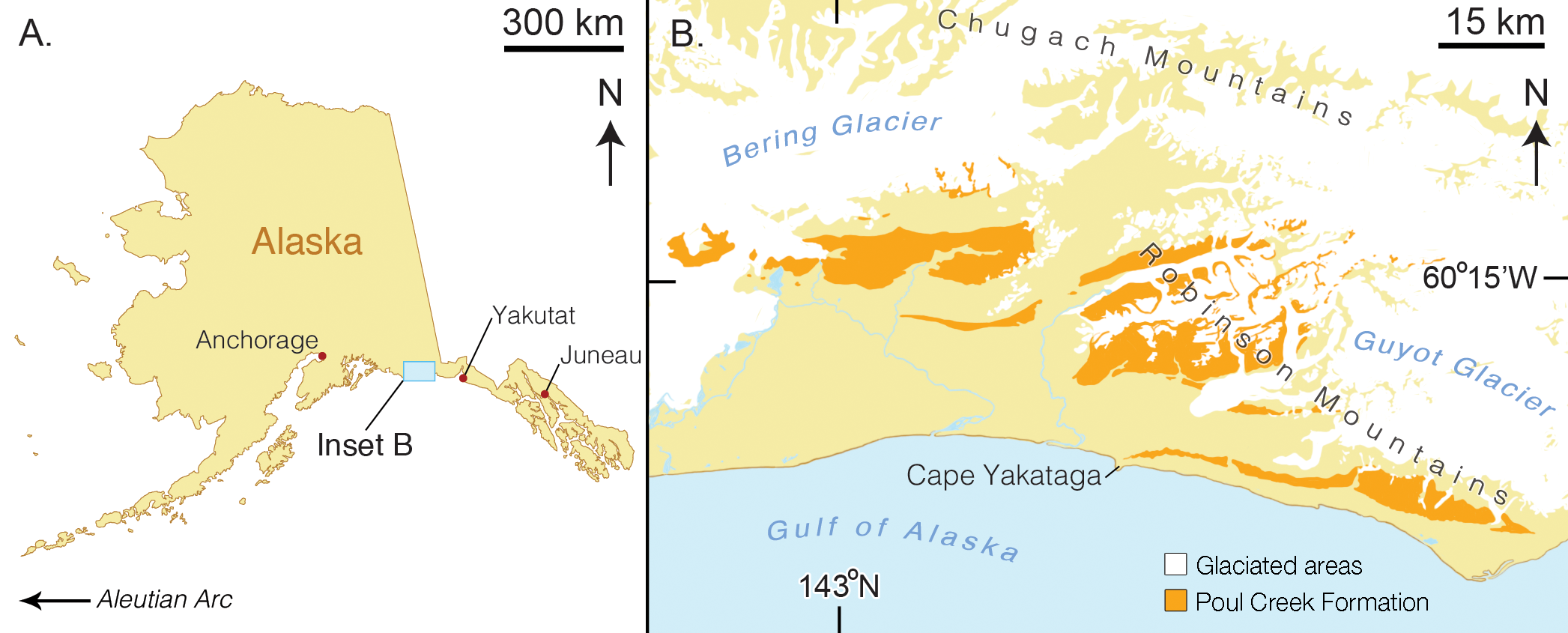
Map of the Poul Creek Formation in Alaska

Found near the 60th parallel north, Arktocara inhabited the subarctic waters of Alaska, and is the northernmost river dolphin known. Arktocara lived somewhere between 29 and 24 million years ago (mya), from the Rupelian to Chattian ages of the Oligocene epoch, making it the oldest-known crown of the toothed whales (Odontoceti), besides possibly Waipatia hectori from 25.2 mya. This time period is thought to have been characterized by the diversification of cetaceans. Many mollusks were found in the Poul Creek Formation that were contemporaneous with Arktocara, such as the nautilus species Aturia alaskensis and A. angustata; gastropod species such as Scaphander alaskensis and Turritella hamiltonensis; and pelecypods such as Venericardia yakatagensis and Cyclocardia yakatagensis.

== See also ==
- Evolution of cetaceans
- List of extinct cetaceans
