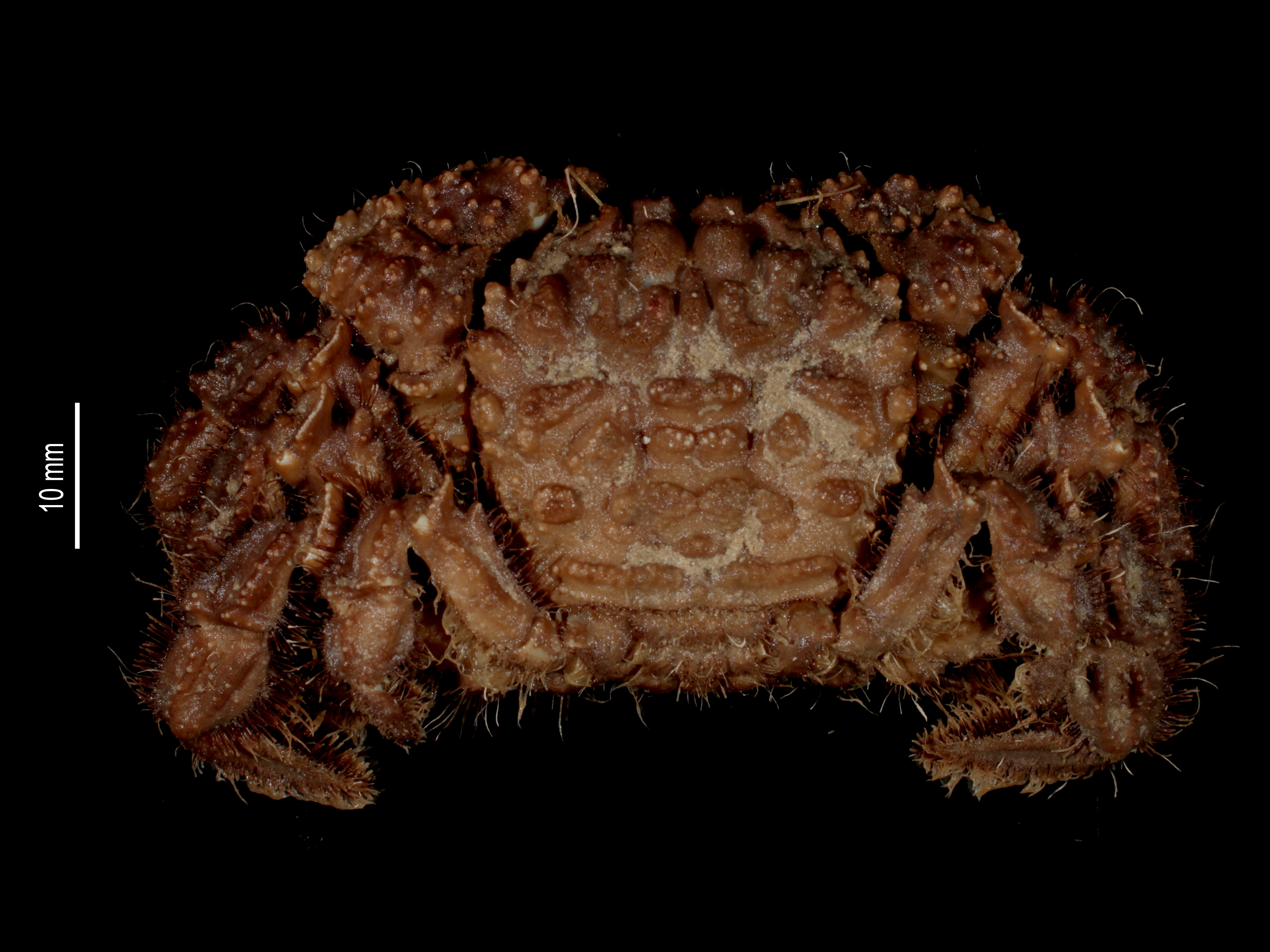
- Vultocinus anfractus

Scientific classification
- Kingdom: Animalia
- Phylum: Arthropoda
- Class: Malacostraca
- Order: Decapoda
- Suborder: Pleocyemata
- Infraorder: Brachyura
- Section: Eubrachyura
- Subsection: Heterotremata
- Superfamily: Goneplacoidea
- Family: Vultocinidae; Ng & Manuel-Santos, 2007
- Genus: Vultocinus; Ng & Manuel-Santos, 2007
- Species: V. anfractus

Binomial name
- Vultocinus anfractus Ng & Manuel-Santos, 2007

= Vultocinus =

Genus of crabs

Vultocinus anfractus is a species of crab, the only species in the family Vultocinidae. It has been found around the Philippines, Vanuatu and New Caledonia, and lives on driftwood. Its discovery forced a reappraisal of the relationships within the superfamily Goneplacoidea, and to the recognition of Mathildellidae, Conleyidae and Progeryonidae as separate families.
