= Poul Creek Formation =

Geologic formation in Alaska, United States

- Stratigraphic range: Paleogene
- Type: Formation

Location
- Region: Alaska
- Country: United States
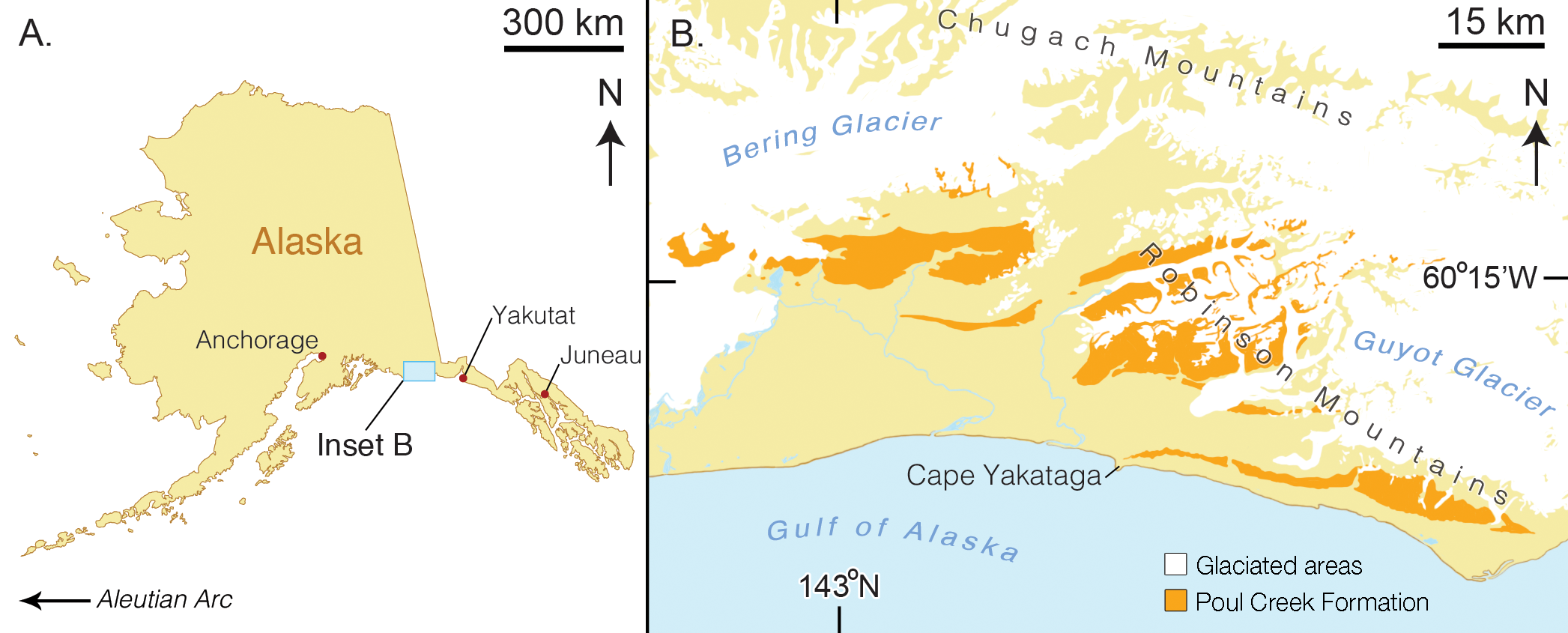

The Poul Creek Formation is a geologic formation in Alaska. It preserves fossils dating back to the Paleogene period.

== Fossil content ==
Color key: Taxon / Reclassified taxon / Taxon falsely reported as present / Dubious taxon or junior synonym / Ichnotaxon / Ootaxon / Morphotaxon	Notes; Uncertain or tentative taxa are in small text; ~~crossed out~~ taxa are discredited.

=== Mammals ===
Mammals reported from the Poul Creek Formation
Genus	Species	Presence	Material	Notes	Images
Arktocara	A. yakataga	Yakutat City	Incomplete skull (USNM 214830)	A platanistoid dolphin	

=== Crustaceans ===
Crustaceans reported from the Poul Creek Formation
Genus	Species	Presence	Material	Notes	Images
Branchioplax	B. washingtoniana	Bering Lake	One specimen (USNM 431271)	A mathildellid crab	
Eumorphocorystes	E. naselensis	Kayak Island	Five specimens	A raninid crab	
Orbitoplax	O. plafkeri	Wingham Island	Eight specimens	A euryplacid crab	
Portunites	P. alaskensis	Bering Lake; Kayak Island	Five specimens	A portunoid crab	

=== Molluscs ===
==== Bivalves ====
Bivalves reported from the Poul Creek Formation
Genus	Species	Presence	Material	Notes	Images
Cardium	C. (Ceratoderma) yakatagensis	Yakataga anticline	One specimen	A cardiid	
Cardium	C. (Laevicardium) alaskensis	Yakataga anticline	Multiple specimens	A cardiid	
Cardium	C. (Papyridea) brooksi	Yakataga anticline	Multiple specimens	A cardiid	
Cardium	C. (Serripes?) hamiltonensis	Yakataga anticline	Multiple specimens	A cardiid	
Chione	C. cf. cryptolineata	Yakataga anticline	One specimen	A venerid	
Chione	C. securis alaskensis	Yakataga anticline	One specimen	A venerid	
Heterodonax	H. sp.	Yakataga anticline	One specimen	A psammobiid	
Hiatella	H. arctica	Yakataga anticline	One specimen	A hiatellid, originally reported as Saxicava pholadis	
Leda	L. fossa	Yakataga anticline	One specimen	Reassigned to the genus Nuculana	
Macoma	M. cf. middendorffi	Yakataga anticline	Multiple specimens	A tellinid	
Macoma	M. cf. secta	Yakataga anticline	Two specimens	A tellinid	
Macrocallista	M. pittsburgensis	Yakataga anticline	Several specimens	A venerid	
Macrocallista	M.? rearensis	Yakataga anticline	One specimen	A venerid	
Mactra	M. (Mactrotoma) californica equilateralis	Yakataga anticline	Multiple specimens	A mactrid	
Mya	M. salmonensis	Yakataga anticline	Multiple specimens	A myid	
Mya	M. truncata	Yakataga anticline	One specimen	A myid	
Nucula	N. (Acila) gettysburgensis alaskensis	Yakataga anticline	Multiple specimens	A nuculid	
Nucula	N. (Acila) hamiltonensis	Yakataga anticline	Multiple specimens	A nuculid	
Nucula	N. (Acila) yakatagensis	Yakataga anticline	One specimen	A nuculid	
Nuculana	N. fossa	Yakataga anticline	One specimen	A nuculanid, originally reported as Leda fossa	
Pandora	P. (Kennerlia) yakatagensis	Yakataga anticline	Multiple specimens	A pandorid	
Panomya	P. (Arctica) turgida	Yakataga anticline	Multiple specimens	A hiatellid	
Panomya	P. sp.	Yakataga anticline	One specimen	A hiatellid	
Pecten	P. (Patinopecten) yakatagensis	Yakataga anticline	Multiple specimens	A pectinid	
Phacoides	P. cf. columbianum	Yakataga anticline	Two specimens	A lucinid	
Pitaria	P. (Katherinella) arnoldi	Yakataga anticline	Multiple specimens	A venerid	
Saxicava	S. pholadis		One specimen	Junior synonym of Hiatella arctica	
Schizothaerus	S. nuttallii	Yakataga anticline	Multiple specimens	A mactrid	
Schizothaerus	S. trapezoides	Yakataga anticline	Two specimens	A mactrid	
Spisula	S. ramonensis	Yakataga anticline	Several specimens	A mactrid	
Tellina	T. sp.	Yakataga anticline	Two specimens	A tellinid	
Thracia	T. schencki	Yakataga anticline	Numerous specimens	A thraciid	
Thyasira	T. bisecta	Yakataga anticline	Multiple specimens	A thyasirid	
Venericardia	V. hamiltonensis	Yakataga anticline	Multiple specimens	A carditid	
Venericardia	V. yakatagensis	Yakataga anticline	Multiple specimens	A carditid	
Yoldia	Y. indet.	Yakataga anticline	An imperfect cast	A yoldiid	

==== Cephalopods ====
Cephalopods reported from the Poul Creek Formation
Genus	Species	Presence	Material	Notes	Images
Aturia	A. angusta alaskensis	Yakataga anticline	Multiple specimens	A nautiloid	

==== Gastropods ====
Gastropods reported from the Poul Creek Formation
Genus	Species	Presence	Material	Notes	Images
Argobuccinum	A. sp.	Yakataga anticline	Several imperfect specimens	A cymatiid	
Bathybembix	B. turbonata	Yakataga anticline	Multiple specimens	An eucyclid, originally reported as Turcicula turbonata	
Cancellaria	C. (Progabbi) alaskensis	Yakataga anticline	Multiple specimens	A cancellariid	
Colus	C. rearensis	Yakataga anticline	Multiple specimens	A colid	
Epitonium	E. (Boreoscala) cf. groenlandica	Yakataga anticline	An imperfect specimen	An epitoniid	
Fusinus	F. cf. hannibali	Yakataga anticline	Multiple specimens	A fasciolariid	
Galeodea	G. apta	Yakataga anticline	Multiple specimens	A cassid	
Haminoea	H. sp.	Yakataga anticline	One specimen	A haminoeid	
Natica	N. (Cryptonatica) sp.	Yakataga anticline	One specimen	A naticid	
Neptunea	N. aff. tabulatus	Yakataga anticline	Multiple specimens	A buccinid	
Polinices	P. (Euspira) cf. galianoi	Yakataga anticline	Several specimens	A naticid	
Polinices	P. (Euspira) ramonensis	Yakataga anticline	Multiple specimens	A naticid	
Psephaea	P. corrugata	Yakataga anticline	Multiple specimens	A volutid	
Scaphander	S. alaskensis	Yakataga anticline	One specimen	A scaphandrid	
Turcicula	T. turbonata	Yakataga anticline	Multiple specimens	Moved to the genus Bathybembix	
Turritella	T. hamiltonensis	Yakataga anticline	Multiple specimens	A turritellid	
Turritella	T. cf. porterensis	Yakataga anticline	Numerous specimens	A turritellid	
Turritella	T. sp.	Yakataga anticline	One specimen	A turritellid	

== See also ==
- List of fossiliferous stratigraphic units in Alaska
- Paleontology in Alaska
