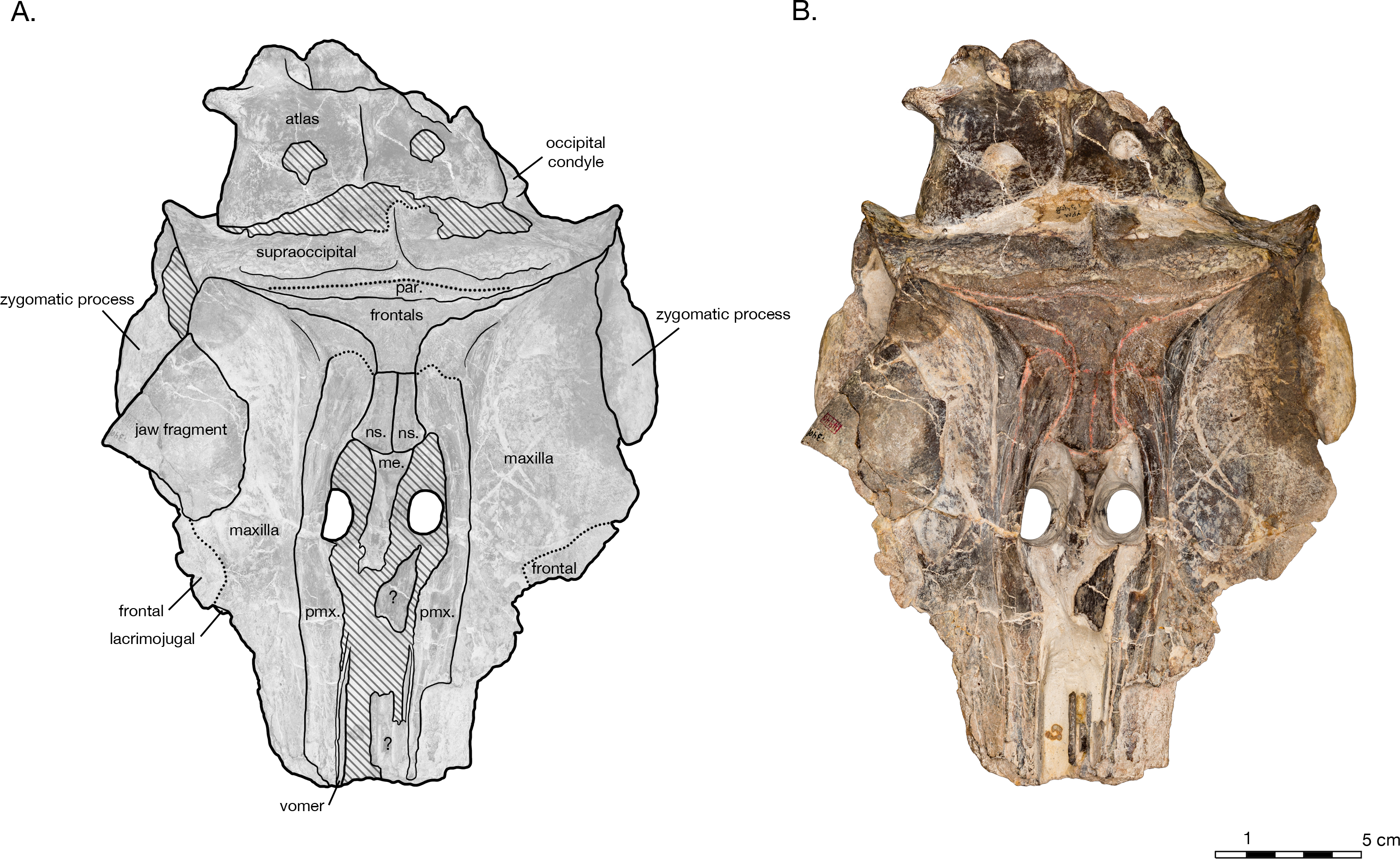
- A. pratti holotype skull shown from above

Scientific classification
- Kingdom: Animalia
- Phylum: Chordata
- Class: Mammalia
- Order: Artiodactyla
- Infraorder: Cetacea
- Family: †Allodelphinidae; Barnes, 2006
- Genus: †Allodelphis; Wilson, 1935

Species
- A. pratti Wilson, 1935 (type); A. woodburnei Barnes and Reynolds, 2009

= Allodelphis =

Allodelphis Temporal range: late Chattian-Aquitanian, 24–22 Ma

Extinct genus of whale

Allodelphis is an extinct genus of whale belonging to Allodelphinidae found in marine deposits of the eastern North Pacific.

== Description ==
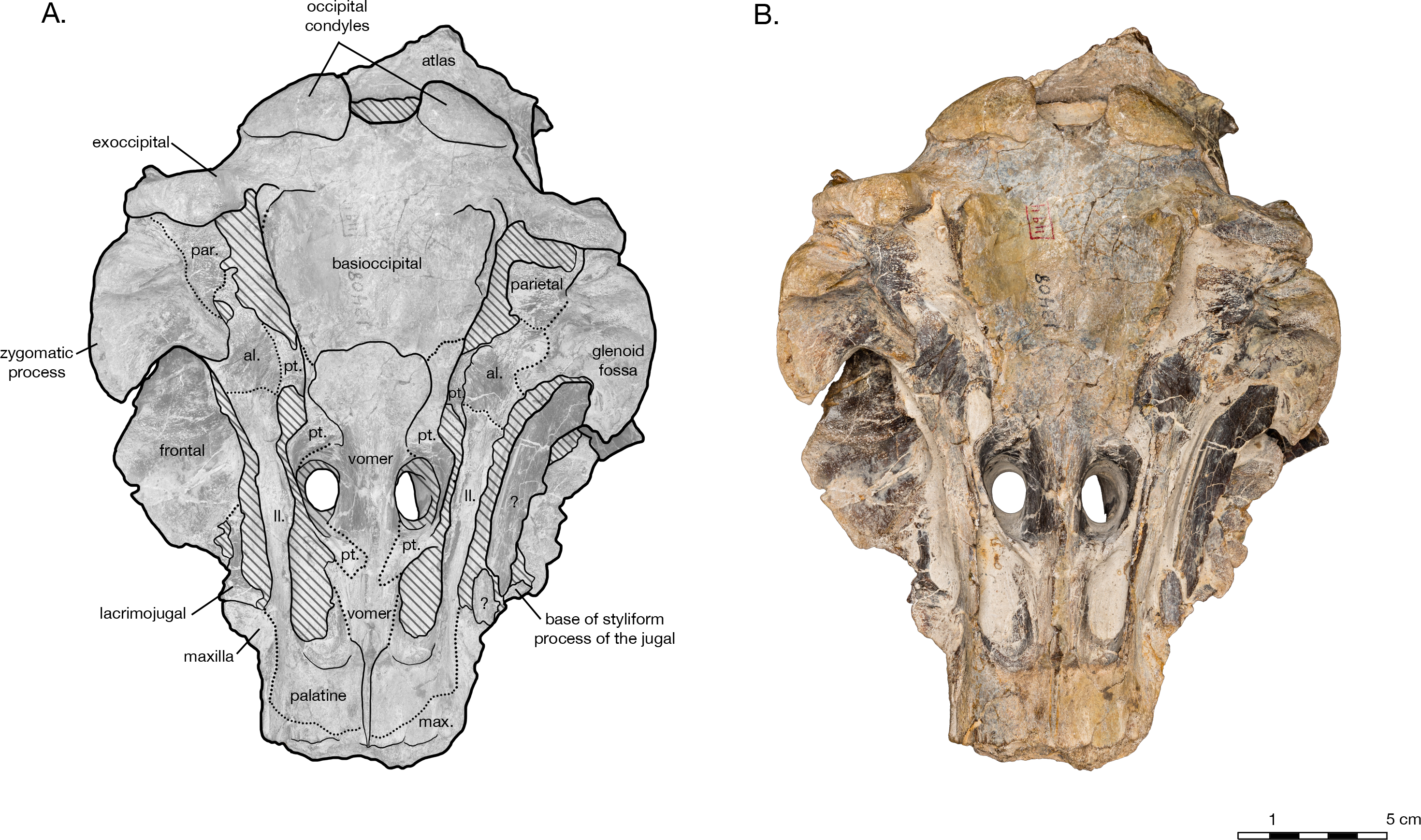
A. pratti holotype skull shown from below

Allodelphis has a very elongated rostrum and a polydont, heterodont dentition. It differs from Ninjadelphis and Zarhinocetus in the following characters: wider dorsal opening of mesorostral canal anterior to dorsal nares, posterior part of rostrum anterior to dorsal nares not depressed, posterior ends of premaxillae less irregular and digitated, posterior ends of premaxillae extending posteriorly beyond level of posterior margins of corresponding nasal bones, nasal bones elevated anteriorly rather than tilting anteroventrally into posterior part of dorsal nares, nasal bones expanded in width anteriorly rather than narrow anteriorly, nasal bones not fused to each other at midline or to underlying frontal bones, instead having margins defined clearly by sutures, nasal bones and dorsal exposures of frontal bones at cranial vertex symmetrical, with mid-line sutures on mid-sagittal plane rather than skewed asymmetrically to left side, right and left halves of nuchal crest symmetrical and having approximately equal widths and curvatures, and nuchal crest nearly straight transversely rather than curved anteriorly near cranial vertex; tympanic bulla with less inflated outer lip, and smaller and more posteriorly directed sigmoid process; atlas vertebra having dorsal transverse process tapered and not expanded dorsoventrally.

== Taxonomy ==
Two species are currently recognized, A. pratti and A. woodburnei. The latter species is found in younger (Early Miocene, Aquitanian) deposits than A. pratti, which is found in the late Oligocene Jewett Sand Formation of Kern County, California.

== Biology ==
The nature of the sediments in which Allodelphis has been found denotes a neritic environment for the genus. The advanced degree of telescoping in the cranium shows that it could track prey using echolocation.
