= Litocheiridae =

Scientific classification
- Kingdom: Animalia
- Phylum: Arthropoda
- Class: Malacostraca
- Order: Decapoda
- Suborder: Pleocyemata
- Infraorder: Brachyura
- Superfamily: Goneplacoidea
- Family: Litocheiridae; Kinahan, 1856

Family of crabs

Litocheiridae is a family of crustaceans belonging to the order Decapoda.

Genera:

- Georgeoplax Türkay, 1983
- Gollincarcinus Beschin & De Angeli, 2004
- Lessinioplax Beschin & De Angeli, 2004
- Litocheira Kinahan, 1856
- Maingrapsus Tessier, Beschin, Busulini & De Angeli, 1999
- Paracorallicarcinus Tessier, Beschin, Busulini & De Angeli, 1999
