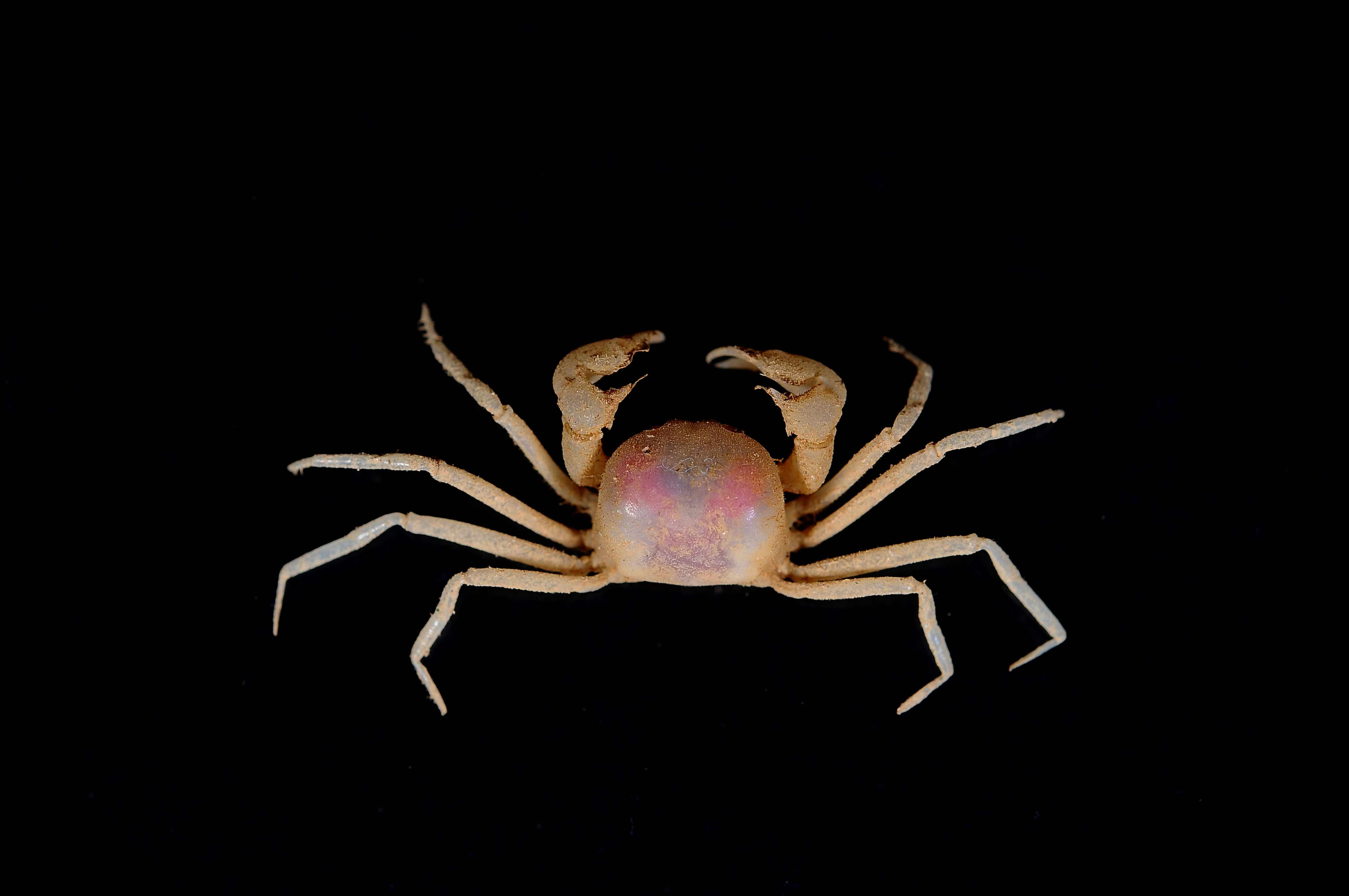

Scientific classification
- Domain: Eukaryota
- Kingdom: Animalia
- Phylum: Arthropoda
- Class: Malacostraca
- Order: Decapoda
- Suborder: Pleocyemata
- Infraorder: Brachyura
- Superfamily: Goneplacoidea
- Family: Chasmocarcinidae

= Chasmocarcinidae =

Family of crabs

Chasmocarcinidae is a family of crustaceans belonging to the order Decapoda.

== Genera ==
Genera:

- Chasmocarcininae Serène, 1964
  - Amboplax Ng & Castro, 2016
  - Angustopelta Ng & Castro, 2016
  - Camatopsis Alcock & Anderson, 1899
  - Chasmocarcinops Alcock, 1900
  - Chasmocarcinus Rathbun, 1898
  - Chinommatia Ng & Castro, 2016
  - Deltopelta Ng & Castro, 2016
  - Gillcarcinus Collins & Morris, 1978 †
  - Hephthopelta Alcock, 1899
  - Microtopsis Komai, Ng & Yamada, 2012
  - Notopelta Ng & Castro, 2016
  - Orthakrolophos Schweitzer & Feldmann, 2001 †
  - Statommatia Ng & Castro, 2016
  - Tenagopelta Ng & Castro, 2016
- Megaesthesiinae Števčić, 2005
  - Alainthesius Ng & Castro, 2016
  - Megaesthesius Rathbun, 1909
- Trogloplacinae Guinot, 1986
  - Australocarcinus Davie, 1988
  - Trogloplax Guinot, 1986
