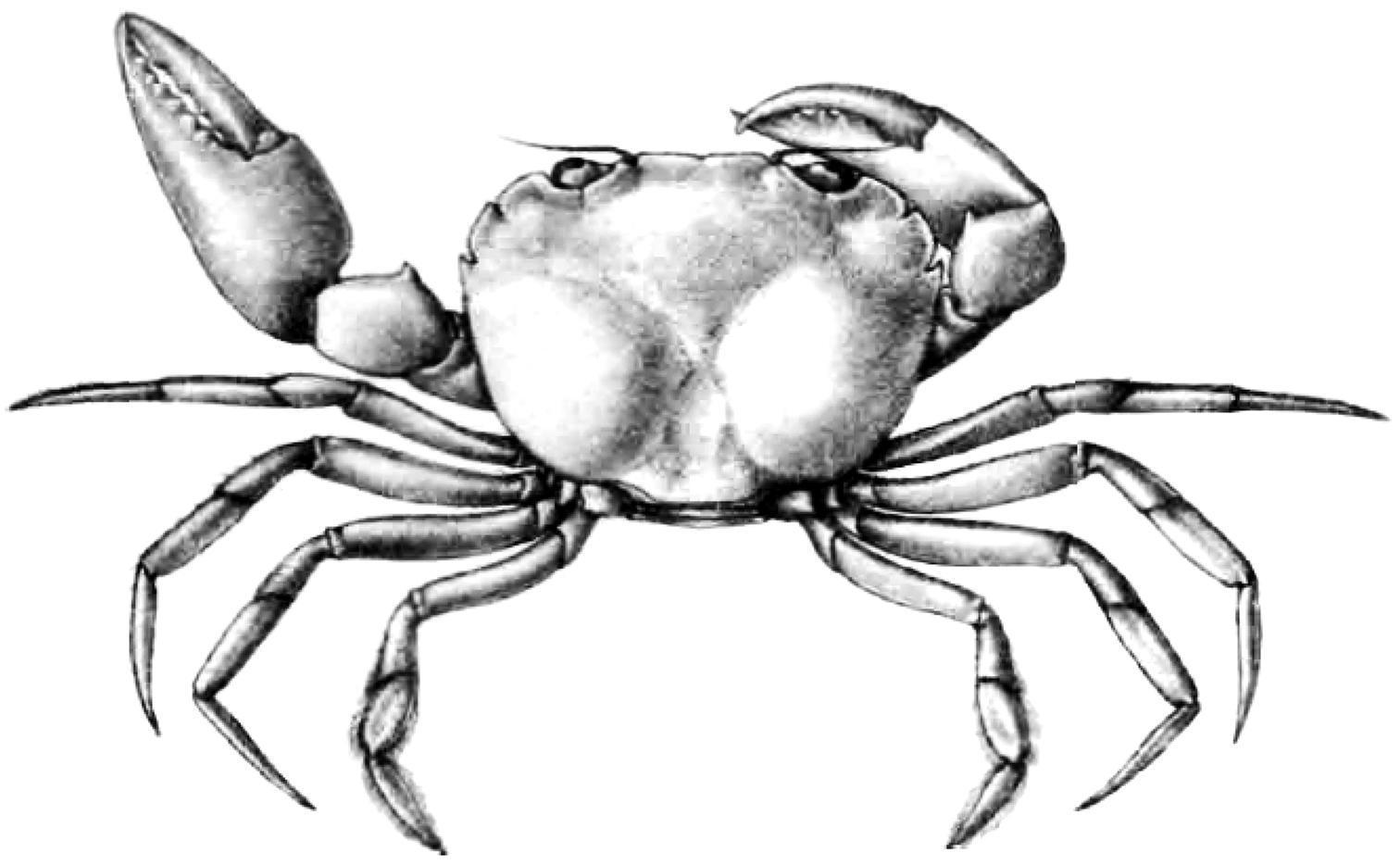
- Nectopanope rhodobaphes

Scientific classification
- Kingdom: Animalia
- Phylum: Arthropoda
- Class: Malacostraca
- Order: Decapoda
- Suborder: Pleocyemata
- Infraorder: Brachyura
- Family: Euryplacidae
- Genus: Nectopanope; Wood-Mason, 1891
- Species: N. rhodobaphes

Binomial name
- Nectopanope rhodobaphes Wood-Mason, 1891

= Nectopanope =

Genus of crabs

Nectopanope rhodobaphes is a species of crabs in the family Euryplacidae, the only species in the genus Nectopanope.
