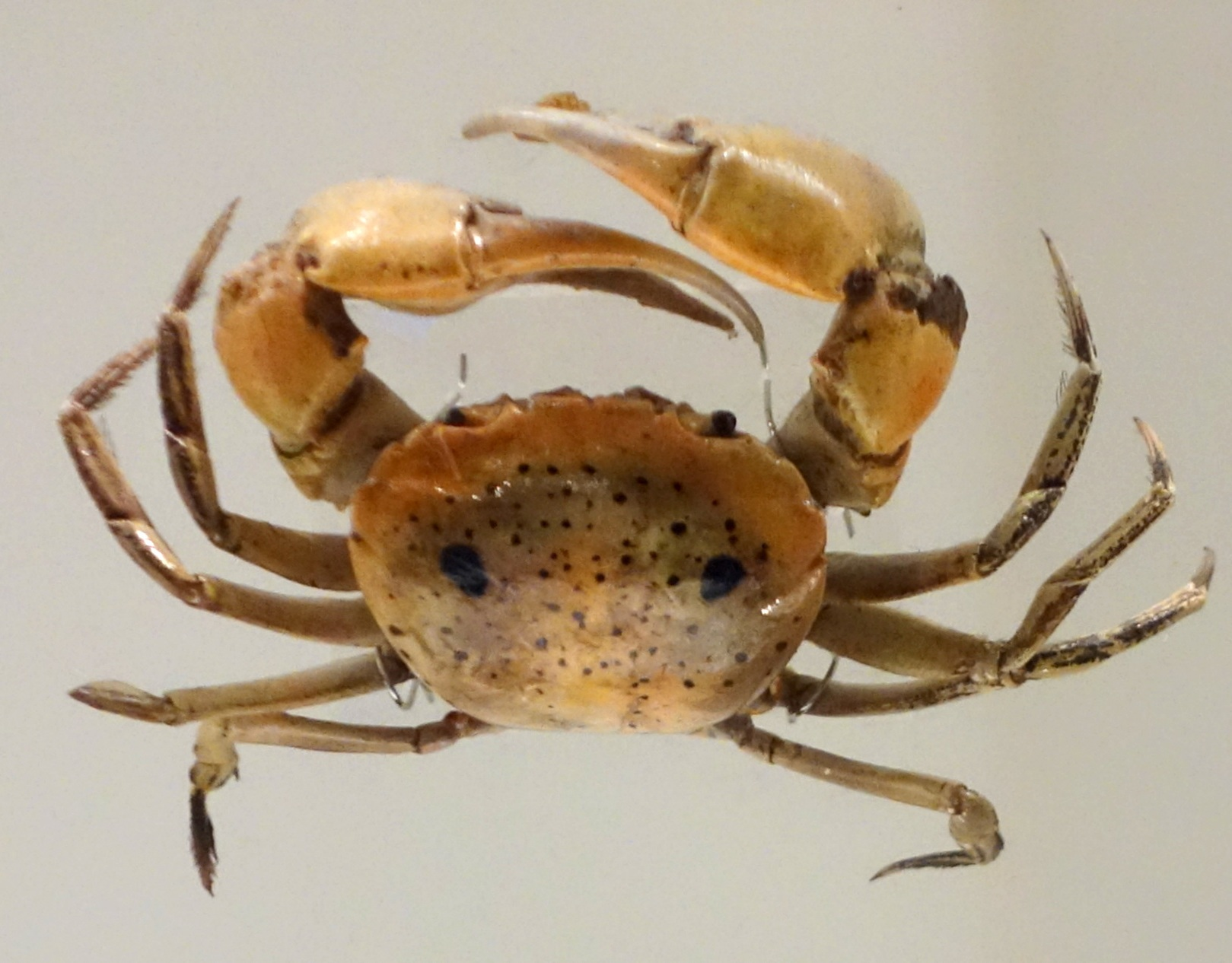

Scientific classification
- Domain: Eukaryota
- Kingdom: Animalia
- Phylum: Arthropoda
- Class: Malacostraca
- Order: Decapoda
- Suborder: Pleocyemata
- Infraorder: Brachyura
- Family: Euryplacidae
- Genus: Eucrate
- Species: E. crenata

Binomial name
- Eucrate crenata (de Haan, 1835)

Synonyms
- Cancer crenata de Haan, 1835

= Eucrate crenata =

Species of crab

Eucrate crenata, the blunt-spined euryplacid crab, is a species of Indo-Pacific crab from the family Euryplacidae. It has invaded the Mediterranean Sea from the Red Sea by Lessepsian migration through the Suez Canal.

== Description ==
Eucrate crenata has a cream coloured, purple speckled carapace. The carapace is smooth and trapezoid shaped being slightly wider at the front than at the posterior. Anterolateral margins are shaped into four teeth, including the orbital angle, with the second and fourth tooth being barely distinguishable. The claws are unequal in size and less than twice the length of the carapace, the walking legs are relatively long, smooth but with hairy tufts on the three outer joints while the last pair of walking legs is flattened. In many specimens there is a medium-sized red spot on the dorsal part of branchial region of the carapace, and also on the subhepatic region on the ventral surface of the carapace. The maximum length of the carapace is 35mm.

== Distribution ==
Eucrate crenata has a natural range from the Red Sea east to the Hawaii. It was first recorded in the Mediterranean Sea off Alexandria in the mid 1930s, and has since spread north to Haifa in Israel, to Turkey and west to the Gulf of Gabes in Tunisia. It is one of the commoner crustaceans found in the Suez Canal.

== Biology ==
Eucrate crenata occurs in areas sand or sandy mud substrates and in areas covered with the sea weed Caulerpa at depths of 35 to 100 meters. In the Bohai Sea off China E.crenata is one of the principal prey items for the tonguefish Cynoglossus semilaevis.
