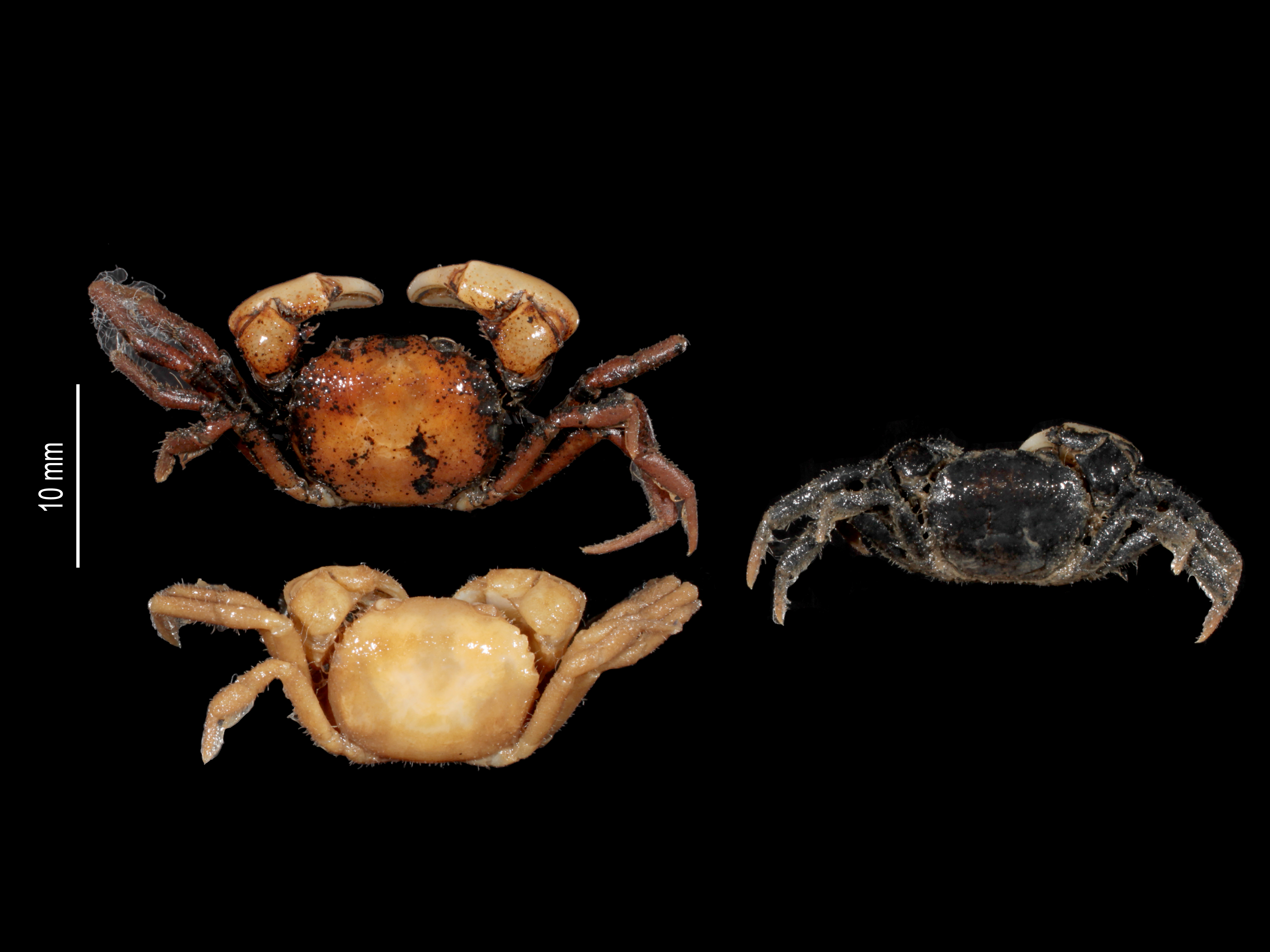
- Australocarcinus riparius

Scientific classification
- Domain: Eukaryota
- Kingdom: Animalia
- Phylum: Arthropoda
- Class: Malacostraca
- Order: Decapoda
- Suborder: Pleocyemata
- Infraorder: Brachyura
- Family: Chasmocarcinidae
- Genus: Australocarcinus; Davie, 1988

Type species
- Australocarcinus riparius Davie, 1988

= Australocarcinus =

Genus of crabs

Australocarcinus is a genus of crabs, of the family Chasmocarcinidae. It includes 4 species.

== Species ==
- Australocarcinus insperatus Ng & Daniels, 2018
- Australocarcinus kanaka Davie & Guinot, 1996
- Australocarcinus palauensis Davie & Guinot, 1996
- Australocarcinus riparius Davie, 1988
