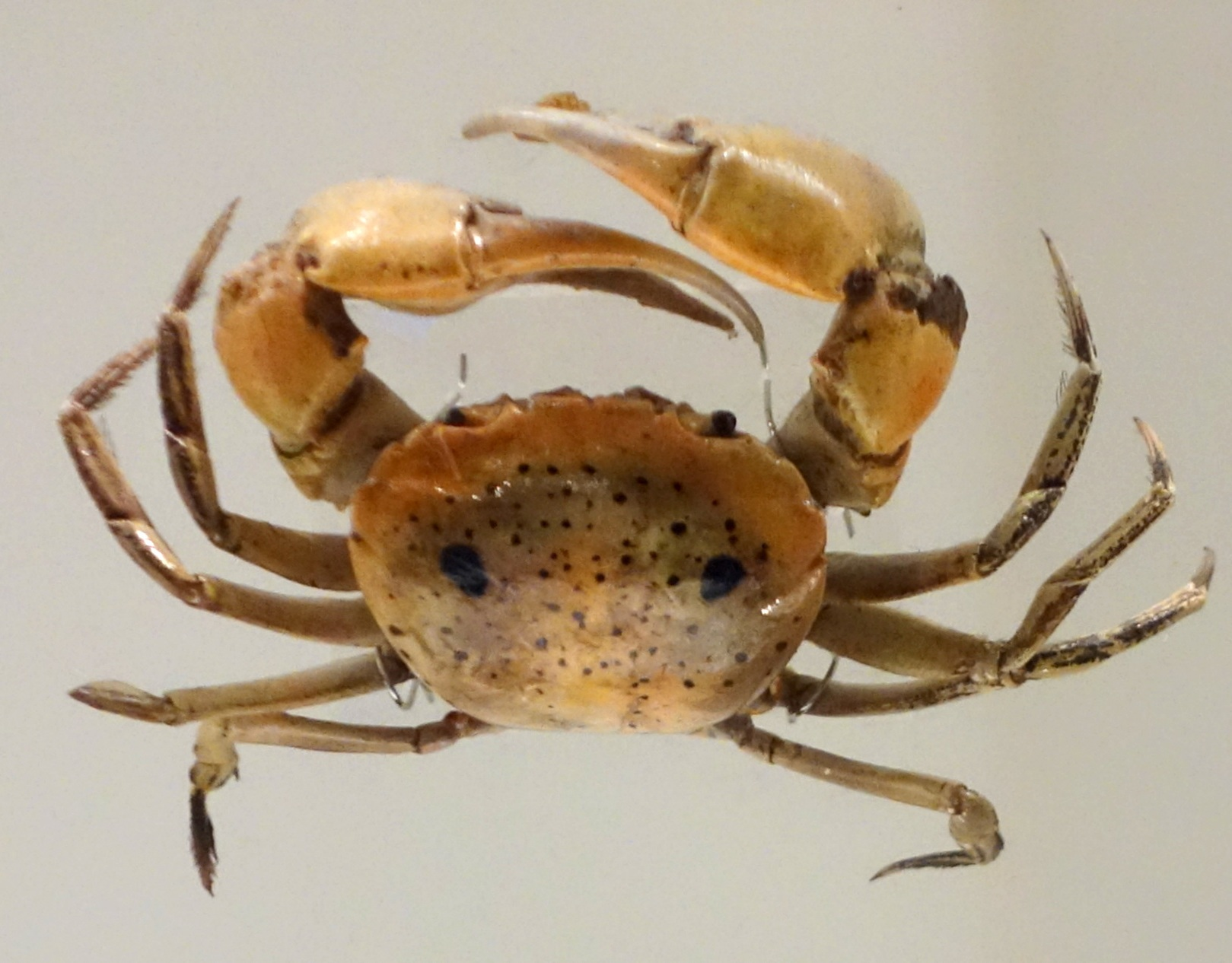
- Eucrate crenata

Scientific classification
- Kingdom: Animalia
- Phylum: Arthropoda
- Class: Malacostraca
- Order: Decapoda
- Suborder: Pleocyemata
- Infraorder: Brachyura
- Family: Euryplacidae
- Genus: Eucrate de Haan, 1835

Type species
- Eucrate crenata de Haan, 1835

= Eucrate =

Genus of crabs

Eucrate is a genus of crabs of the family Euryplacidae containing the following species:

- Eucrate alcocki Serène in Serène & Lohavanijaya, 1973
- Eucrate crenata (De Haan, 1835)
- Eucrate dorsalis (White, 1849)
- Eucrate formosensis Sakai, 1974
- Eucrate indica Castro & Ng, 2010
- †Eucrate martini Rathbun, 1926
- †Eucrate puliensis Hu & Tao, 1996
- Eucrate sexdentata Haswell, 1881
- Eucrate solaris Yang & Sun, 1979
- Eucrate tripunctata Campbell, 1969
