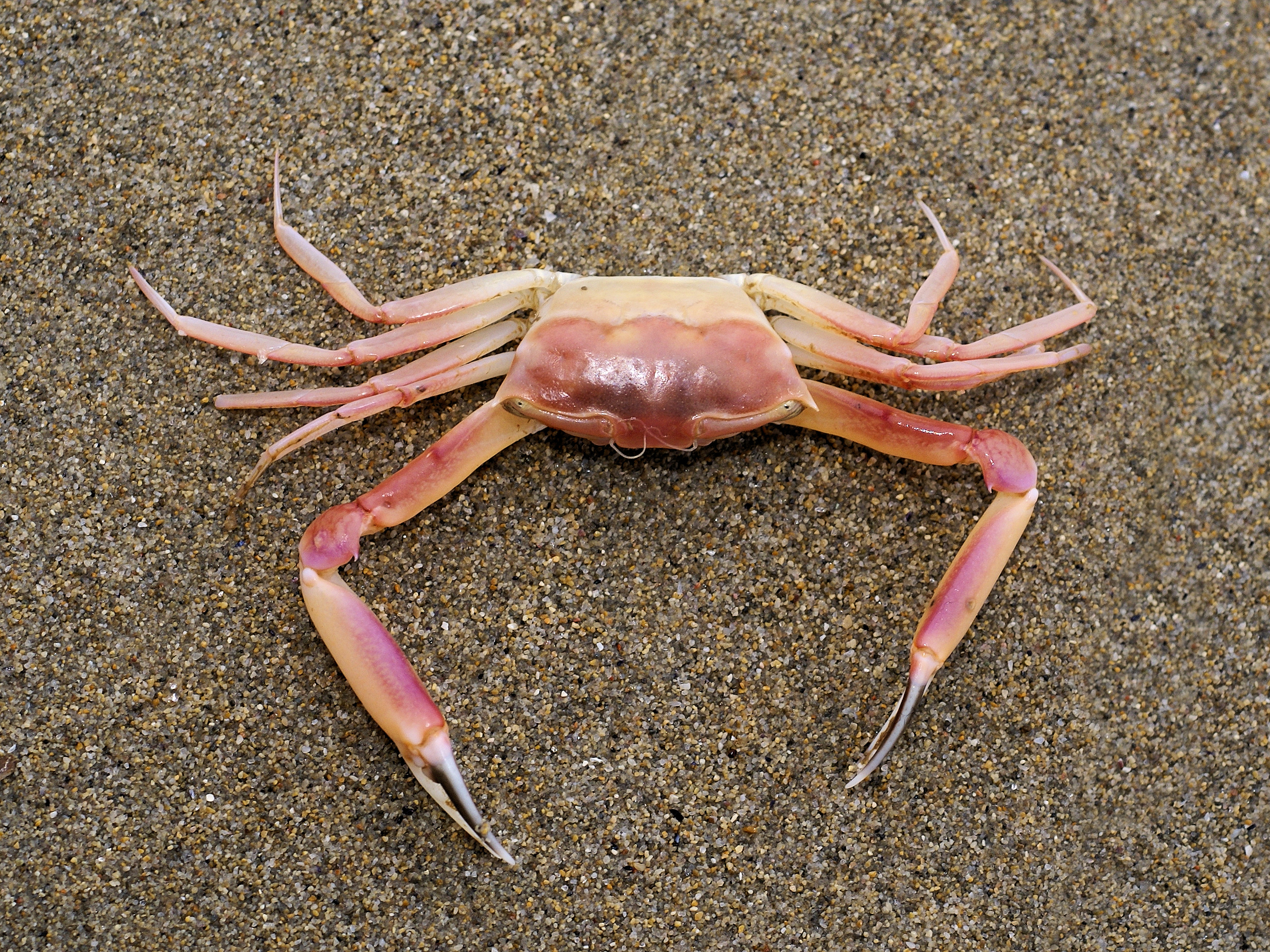
- Goneplax rhomboides

Scientific classification
- Kingdom: Animalia
- Phylum: Arthropoda
- Clade: Pancrustacea
- Class: Malacostraca
- Order: Decapoda
- Suborder: Pleocyemata
- Clade: Reptantia
- Infraorder: Brachyura
- Section: Eubrachyura
- Subsection: Heterotremata
- Superfamily: Goneplacoidea; Macleay, 1838

= Goneplacoidea =

Superfamily of crabs

Goneplacoidea is a superfamily of crabs containing 11 extant families, and two families known only from fossils (marked "†").

- Acidopsidae
- † Carinocarcinoididae
- Chasmocarcinidae
- Conleyidae
- Euryplacidae
- Goneplacidae
- Litocheiridae
- † Martinocarcinidae
- Mathildellidae
- Progeryonidae
- Scalopidiidae
- Sotoplacidae
- Vultocinidae
