= Jewett Sand Formation =

Geologic formation in California, United States

- Stratigraphic range: Neogene: Miocene
- Type: Formation

Location
- Region: California
- Country: United States

The Jewett Sand Formation is a geologic formation in California, United States. It preserves fossils dating back to the Miocene Epoch of the Neogene period.

== Vertebrates ==
=== Cartilaginous fishes ===
==== Sharks ====
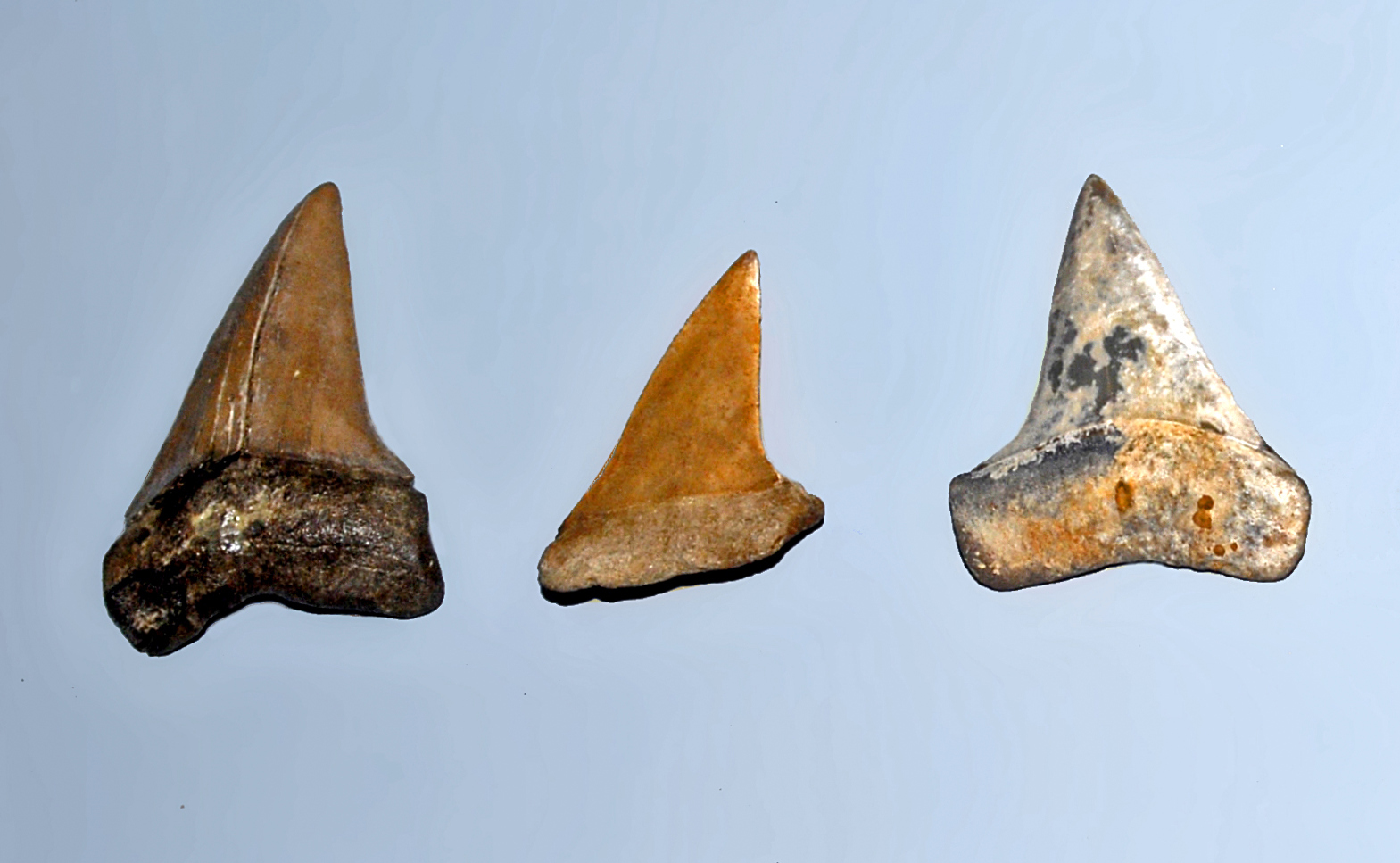
Fossil teeth of C. hastalis

- †Alopias exigua
- †Alopias latidens
- Alopias vulpinus
- †Carcharocles angustidens '
- †Carcharodon hastalis
- Carcharhinus sp.
- Cephaloscyllium sp.
- Cetorhinus sp.
- Echinorhinus blakei
- †Galeocerdo medius
- †Galeorhinus latus
- Heterodontus sp.
- Hexanchus sp.
- †Megachasma applegatei
- †Megalolamna paradoxodon
- †Negaprion elongata
- Odontaspis ferox
- †Parotodus benedini
- Sphyrna sp.
- †Squalus serriculus
- Squatina lerichi

==== Rays and skates ====
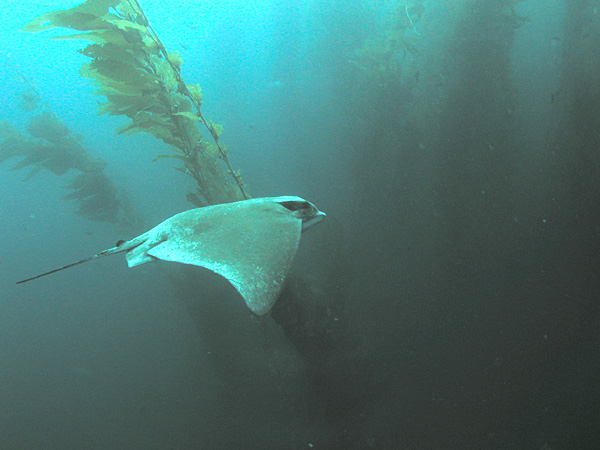
Bat ray in kelp forest, San Clemente Island.

- †Zapteryx californicus
- Myliobatis californicus

=== Bony Fishes ===
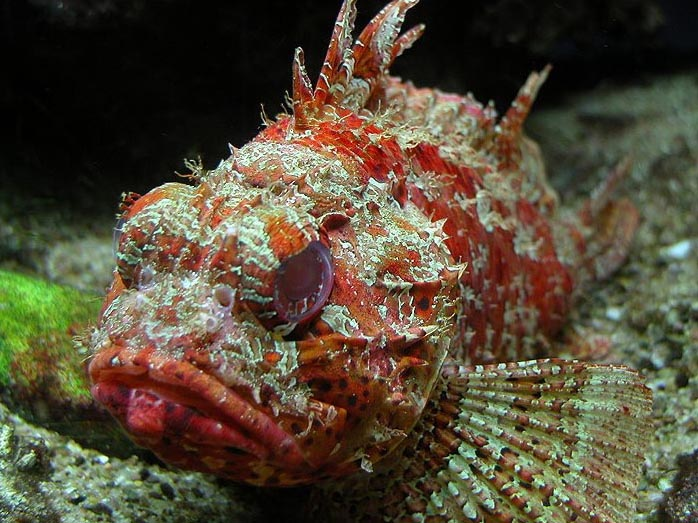
A modern Scorpaenid fish.

- Bothidae indet.
- Embiotocidae indet.
- Gadidae indet.
- Pleuronectidae indet.
- Sciaenidae indet.
- Scorpaenidae indet.

=== Reptiles ===
- Chelonia indet.
- Crocodylia indet.
- †Psephophorus calvertensis

=== Birds ===
- †Plotopterum joaquinensis

=== Mammals ===
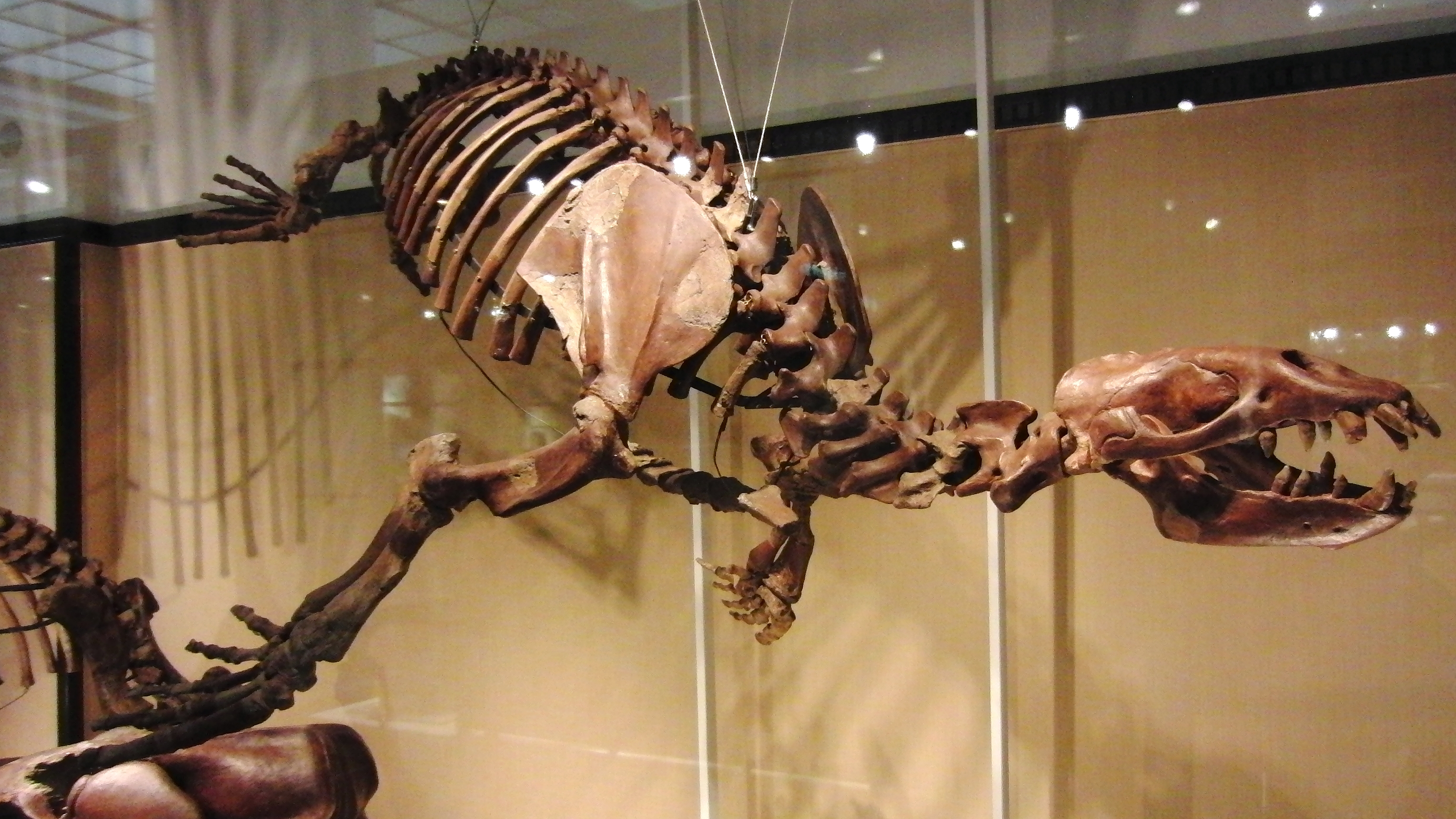
Skeleton of Allodesmus at the National Museum of Nature and Science, Tokyo, Japan.

- †Allodesmus kernensis
- †Allodelphis pratti
- †Amphidelphis bakersfieldensis
- †Anchitherium sp.
- †Argyrocetus joaquinensis
- †Desmathyus
- †Enaliarctidae indet.
- †Enaliarctos mealsi
- †Macrodelphinus kelloggi
- †Miodelphis californicus
- Otariidae indet.
- Phocidae indet.
- Pinnipedia indet.
- †Pinnarctidion bishopi
- †Squalodontidae indet.

== Invertebrates ==
=== Bivalves ===
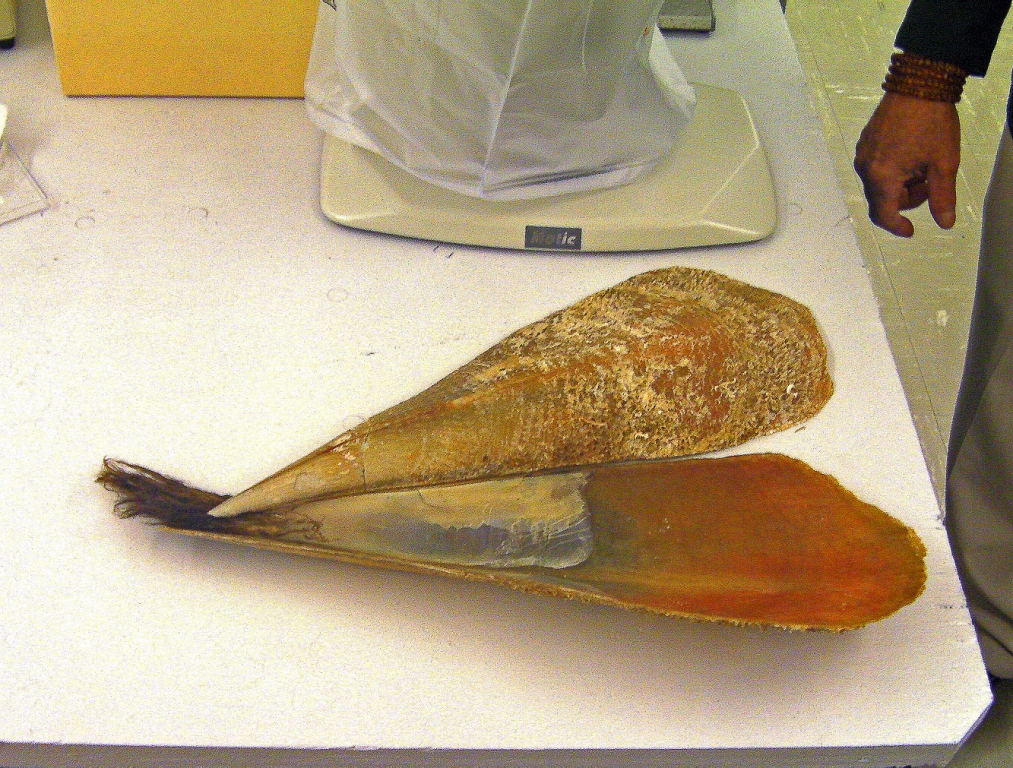
A modern member of the genus Pinna.

- Aequipecten andersoni
- Arca montareyanna
- Chione temblorensis
- Clementia pertenuis
- Crassostrea titan
- Crenomytilus mathewsoni
- Cytheria matthewsoni
- Dosinia conradi
- Dosinia whitneyi
- Glycymeris septentrionalis
- Homomya sp.
- Mactromeris albaria
- Mytilus sp.
- Nodipecten estrellanus
- Pecten bowersi
- Pecten magnolia
- Pecten nevadaensis
- Pecten perrini
- Pecten sespeensis
- Pectunculus branneri
- Phacoides actulineatus
- Pinna alamedaensis
- Pycnodonte eldridgei
- Solen sp.
- Tellina ocoyana
- Tellina sp.
- Trachycardium vaquerosensis

=== Gastropods ===
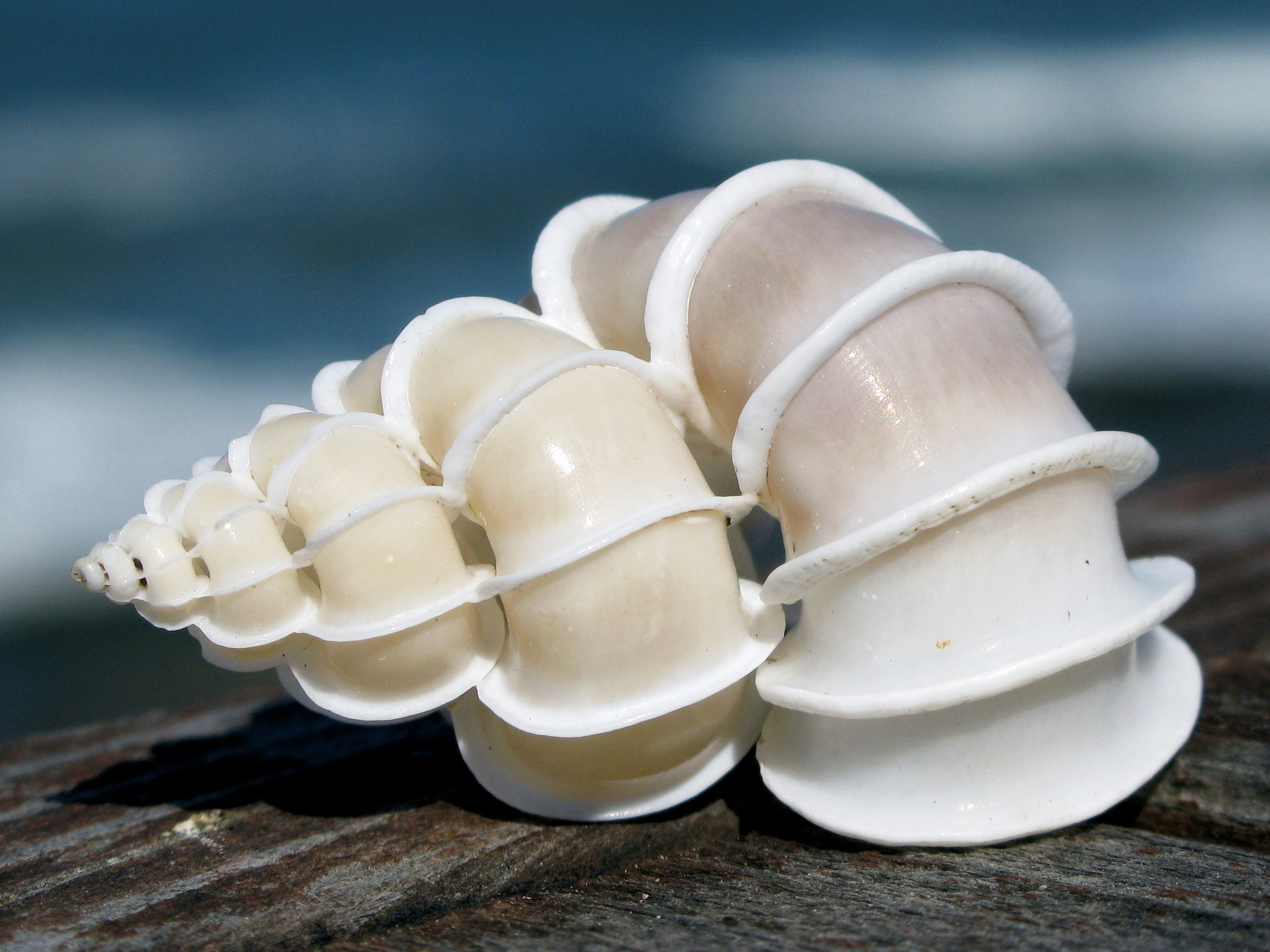
The sculpture of the shell of this modern member of the genus Epitonium has raised ribs that are known as costae. Costae are an almost universal feature in shells of Epitonium species.

- Agasoma gravidum
- Agasoma kerrianum
- Conus oweni
- Crepidula princeps
- Epitonium rugiferum
- Natica lewisi
- Neverita callosa
- Purpura lima

=== Scaphopods ===
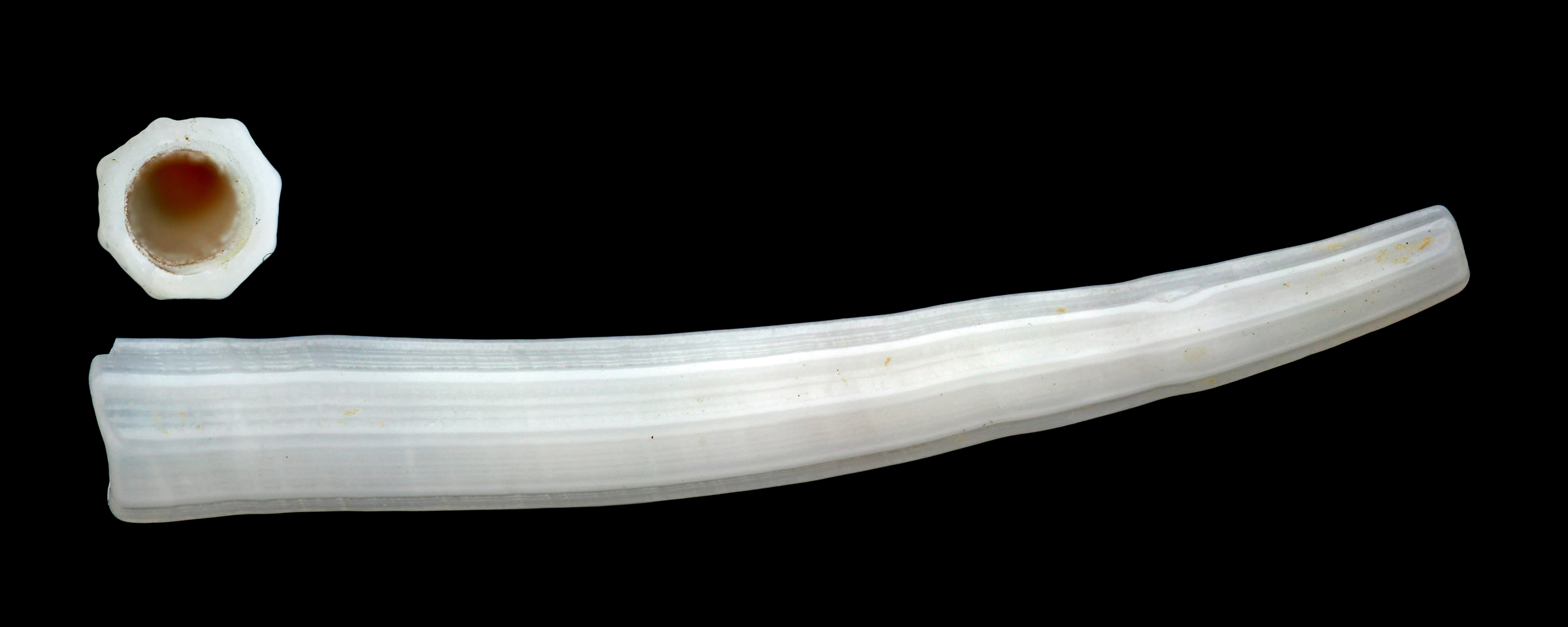
A modern member of the genus Dentalium.

- Dentalium sp.

== See also ==
- List of fossiliferous stratigraphic units in California
- Paleontology in California
