= Acidopsidae =

Scientific classification
- Kingdom: Animalia
- Phylum: Arthropoda
- Class: Malacostraca
- Order: Decapoda
- Suborder: Pleocyemata
- Infraorder: Brachyura
- Superfamily: Goneplacoidea
- Family: Acidopsidae

Family of crabs

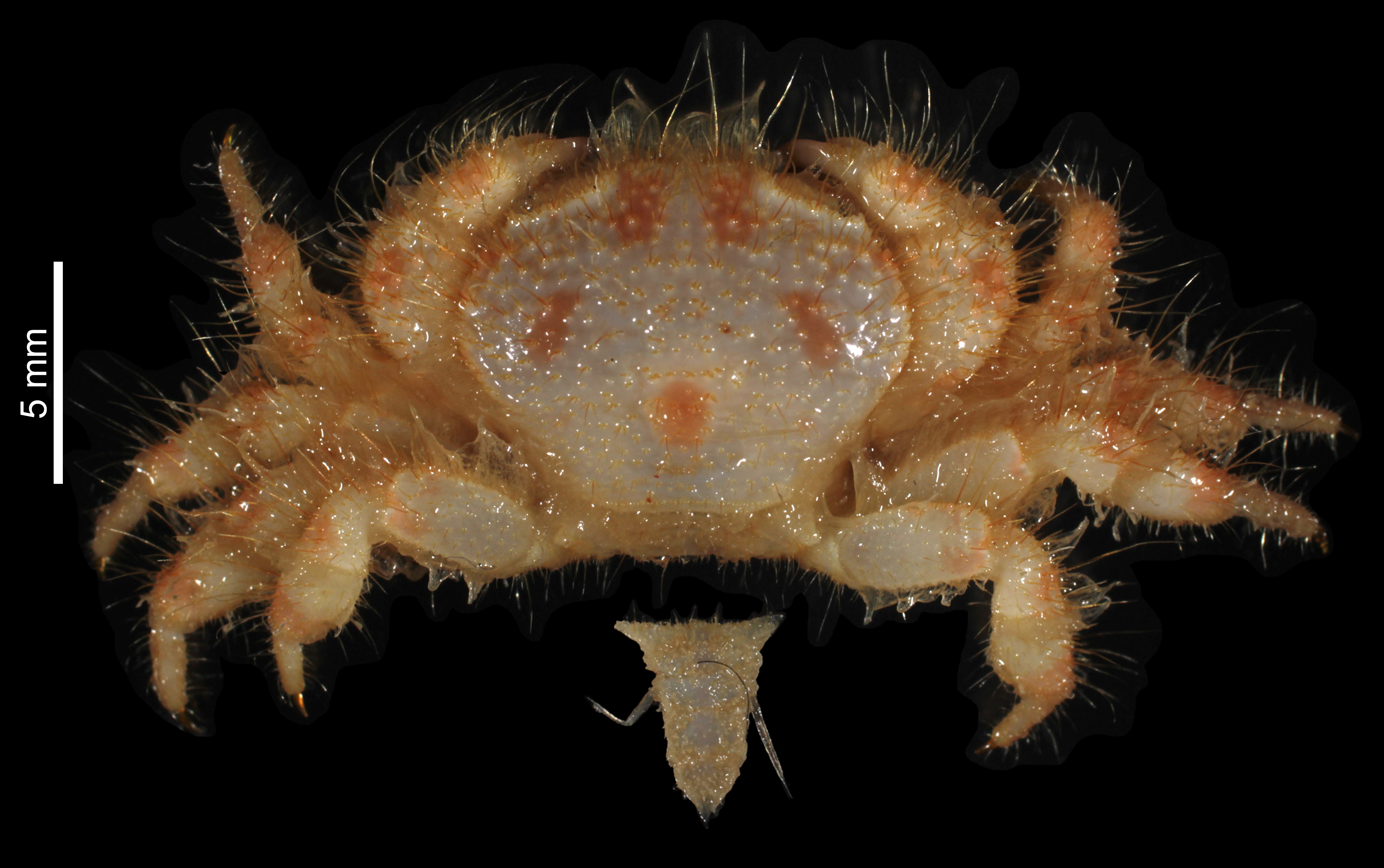
Parapilumnus cristimanus

Acidopsidae is a family of crustaceans belonging to the order Decapoda.

Genera:

- Acidops Stimpson, 1871
- Caecopilumnus Borradaile, 1902
- Crinitocinus P.K.L.Ng & Rahayu, 2014
- Parapilumnus Kossmann, 1877
- Raoulia P.K.L.Ng, 1987
- Thecaplax P.K.L.Ng & Rahayu, 2014
- Typhlocarcinodes Alcock, 1900
