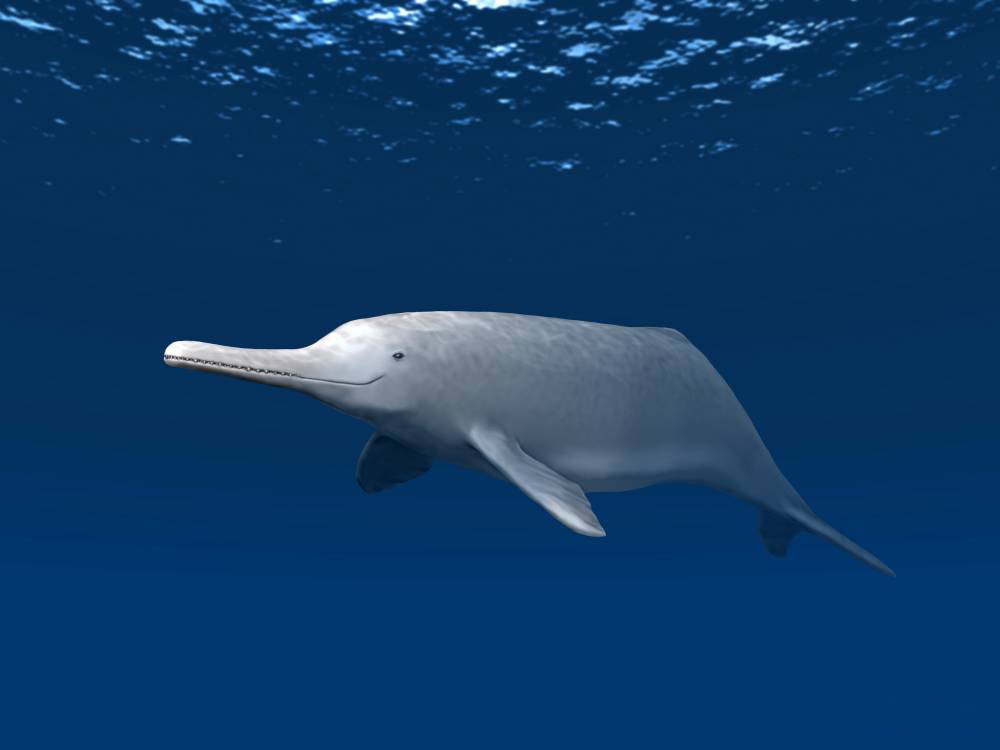
- Reconstruction of Arktocara yakataga

Scientific classification
- Kingdom: Animalia
- Phylum: Chordata
- Class: Mammalia
- Order: Artiodactyla
- Infraorder: Cetacea
- Superfamily: Platanistoidea
- Family: †Allodelphinidae; Barnes, 2006

Genera
- Allodelphis; Arktocara; Goedertius; Ninjadelphis; Zarhinocetus

= Allodelphinidae =

Allodelphinidae Temporal range: ?late Rupelian-Langhian, 29–14.5 Ma

Extinct family of mammals

Allodelphinidae is a family of primitive platanistoid river dolphins found in marine deposits in the eastern North Pacific region, Alaska, and Japan.

== Systematics ==
Allodelphis and Zarhinocetus were formerly classified as members of Delphinidae and Squalodontidae in the original descriptions. In his overview of eastern North Pacific marine mammal assemblages, Lawrence Barnes noted that these two genera did not belong in those families and reassigned Allodelphis to Platanistidae, while removing Squalodon errabundus from Squalodon. Barnes later realized that Allodelphis was more primitive than extinct members of Platanistidae and Squalodelphinidae and placed it and "S." errabundus in a separate family, Allodelphinidae.
