= Conleyus =

Scientific classification
- Kingdom: Animalia
- Phylum: Arthropoda
- Class: Malacostraca
- Order: Decapoda
- Suborder: Pleocyemata
- Infraorder: Brachyura
- Section: Eubrachyura
- Subsection: Heterotremata
- Superfamily: Goneplacoidea
- Family: Conleyidae; Števčić, 2005
- Genus: Conleyus; Ng & N. K. Ng, 2003
- Species: C. defodio

Binomial name
- Conleyus defodio Ng & N. K. Ng, 2003

Genus of crabs

Conleyus defodio is a species of crab, the only species in the genus Conleyus and the family Conleyidae. It lives in rubble beds in Guam, and is named after the collector Harry T. Conley.
