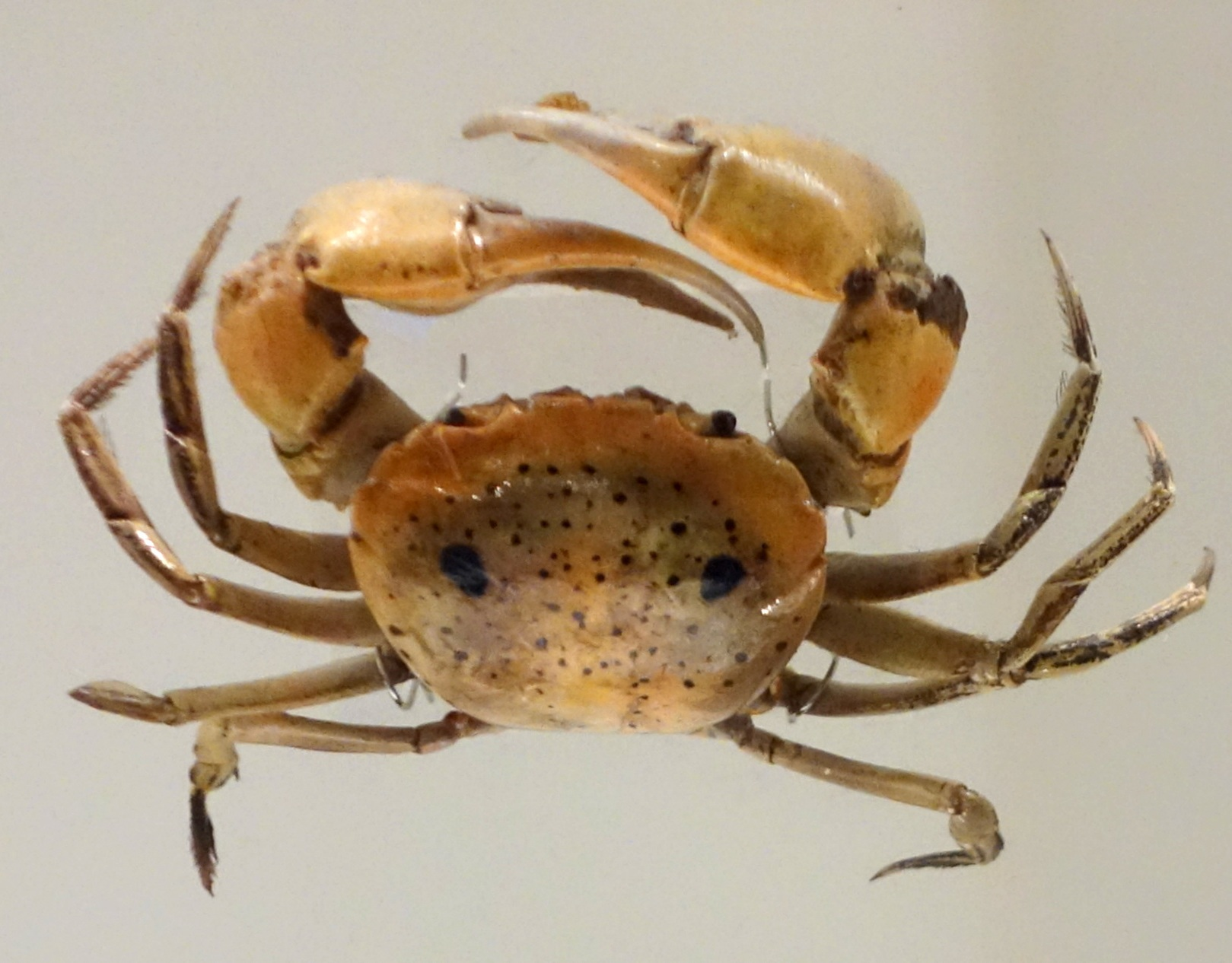
- Eucrate crenata

Scientific classification
- Kingdom: Animalia
- Phylum: Arthropoda
- Class: Malacostraca
- Order: Decapoda
- Suborder: Pleocyemata
- Infraorder: Brachyura
- Superfamily: Goneplacoidea
- Family: Euryplacidae; Stimpson, 1871

= Euryplacidae =

Family of crustaceans

Euryplacidae is a family of crabs in the superfamily Goneplacoidea which contains the following genera:

- †Baldoplax Beschin & De Angeli, 2011
- †Chirinocarcinus Karasawa & Schweitzer, 2004
- †Chlinocephalus Ristori, 1886
- †Corallioplax Beschin, Busulini, Tessier & Zorzin, 2016
- Eucrate De Haan, 1835
- Euryplax Stimpson, 1859
- Frevillea A. Milne-Edwards, 1880
- Henicoplax Castro & Ng, 2010
- Heteroplax Stimpson, 1858
- Machaerus Leach, 1818
- Nancyplax Lemaitre, García-Gómez, von Sternberg & Campos, 2001
- Nectopanope Wood-Mason in Wood-Mason & Alcock, 1891
- †Orbitoplax Tucker & Feldmann, 1990
- †Paleopsopheticus Hu & Tao, 1996
- Platyozius Borradaile, 1902
- †Prealpiplax Beschin, Busulini, Tessier & Zorzin, 2016
- Psopheticoides Sakai, 1969
- †Simonellia Vinassa de Regny, 1897
- †Stoaplax Vega, Cosma, Coutiño, Feldmann, Nyborg, Schweitzer & Waugh, 2001
- Systroplax Castro & Ng, 2010
- Trissoplax Castro & Ng, 2010
- Trizocarcinus Rathbun, 1914
- †Verarena Beschin, Busulini & Tessier in Beschin, Busulini, Tessier & Zorzin, 2019
- †Viaplax Karasawa & Kato, 2003
- Villoplax Castro & Ng, 2010
- Xenocrate Ng & Castro, 2007
