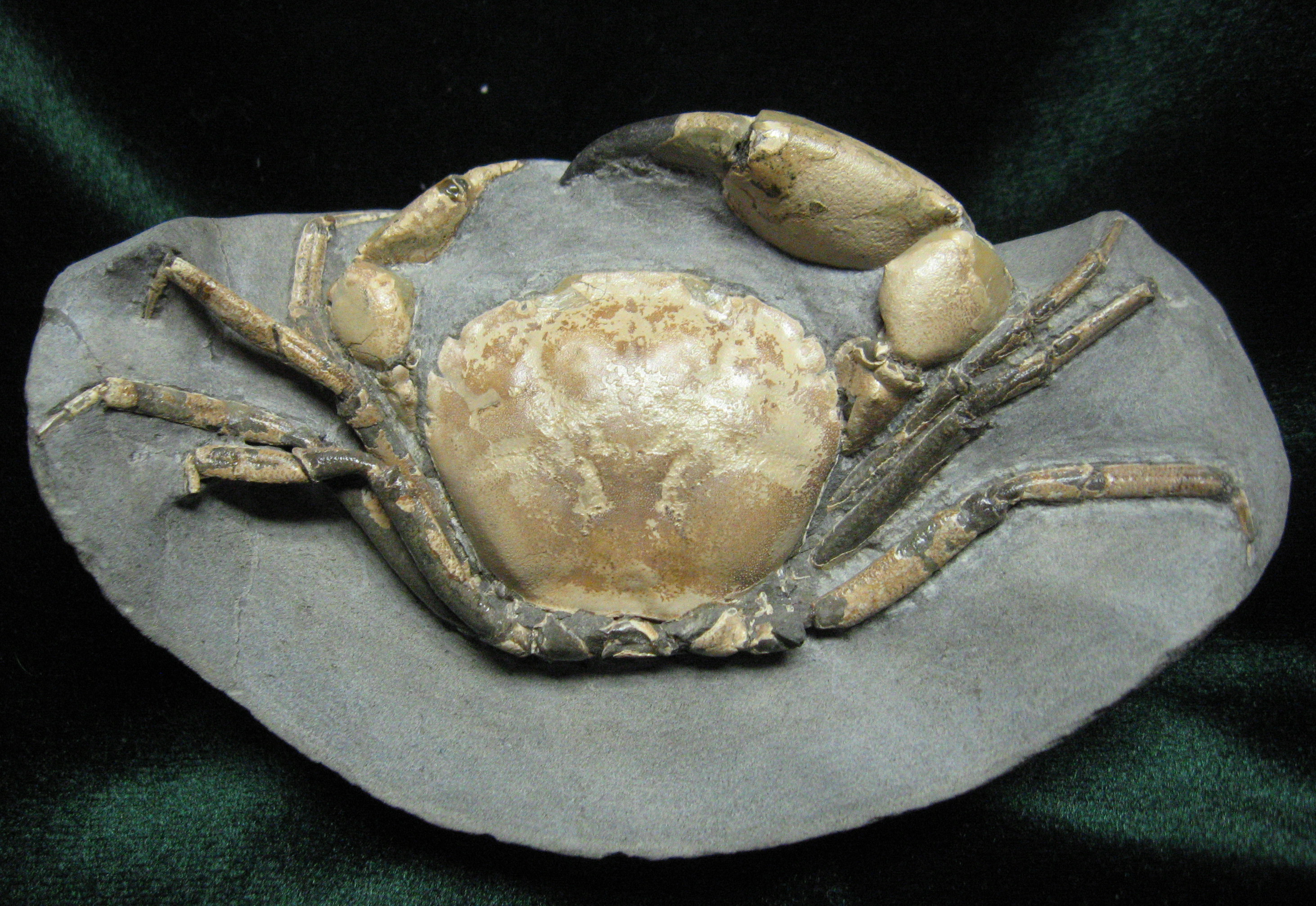
- Fossil Branchioplax washingtoniana

Scientific classification
- Kingdom: Animalia
- Phylum: Arthropoda
- Class: Malacostraca
- Order: Decapoda
- Suborder: Pleocyemata
- Infraorder: Brachyura
- Family: Mathildellidae
- Genus: Branchioplax; Rathbun, 1916

= Branchioplax =

Branchioplax Temporal range: Eocene

Extinct genus of crabs

Branchioplax is an extinct genus of crab which existed in Alaska and Washington during the Eocene period. It was first named by Mary Rathbun in 1916, and contains ten species, including Branchioplax washingtoniana from the Hoko River Formation, Branchioplax carmanahensis, and Branchioplax ballingi.

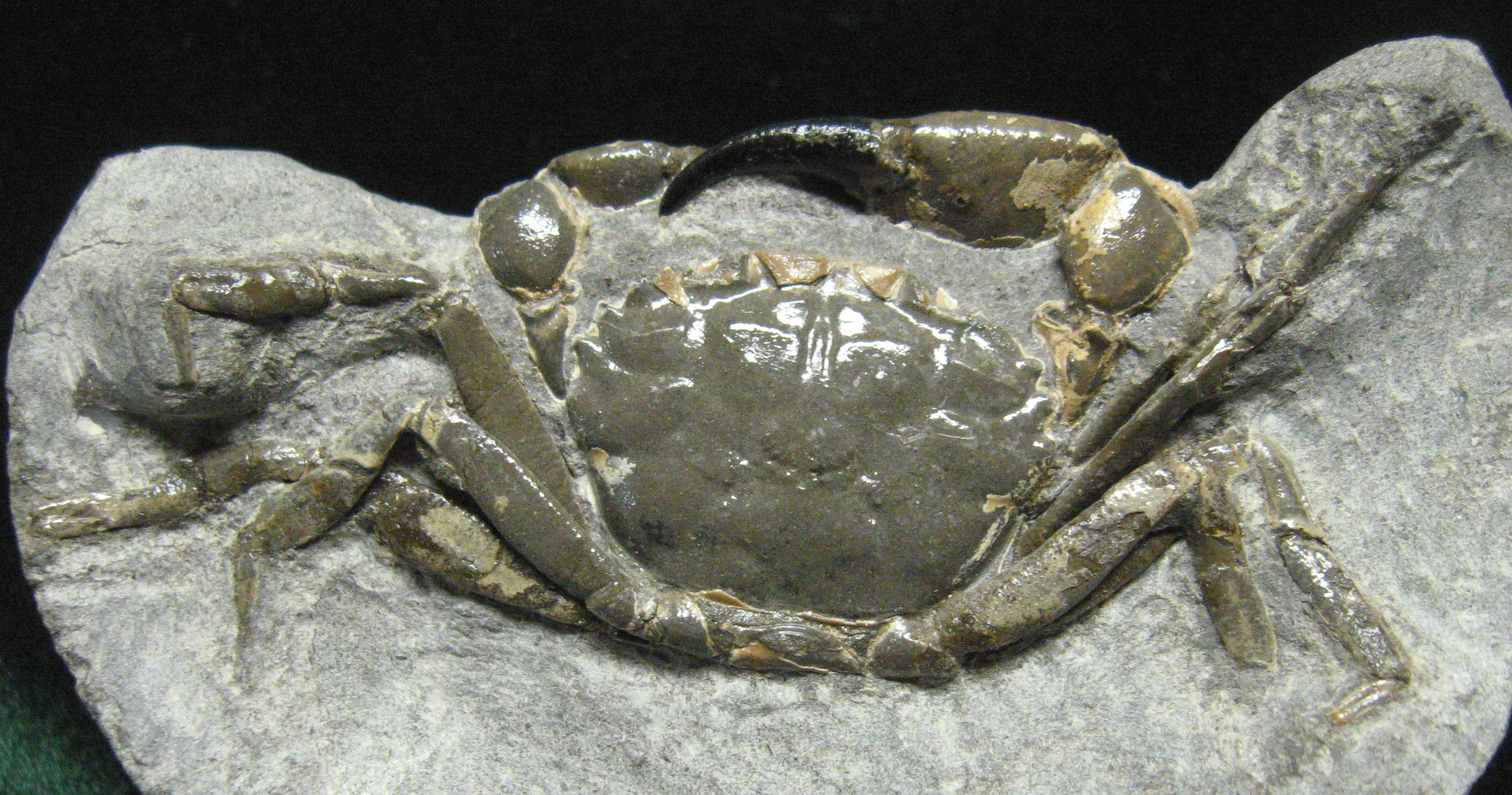
Fossil Branchioplax carmanahensis.
