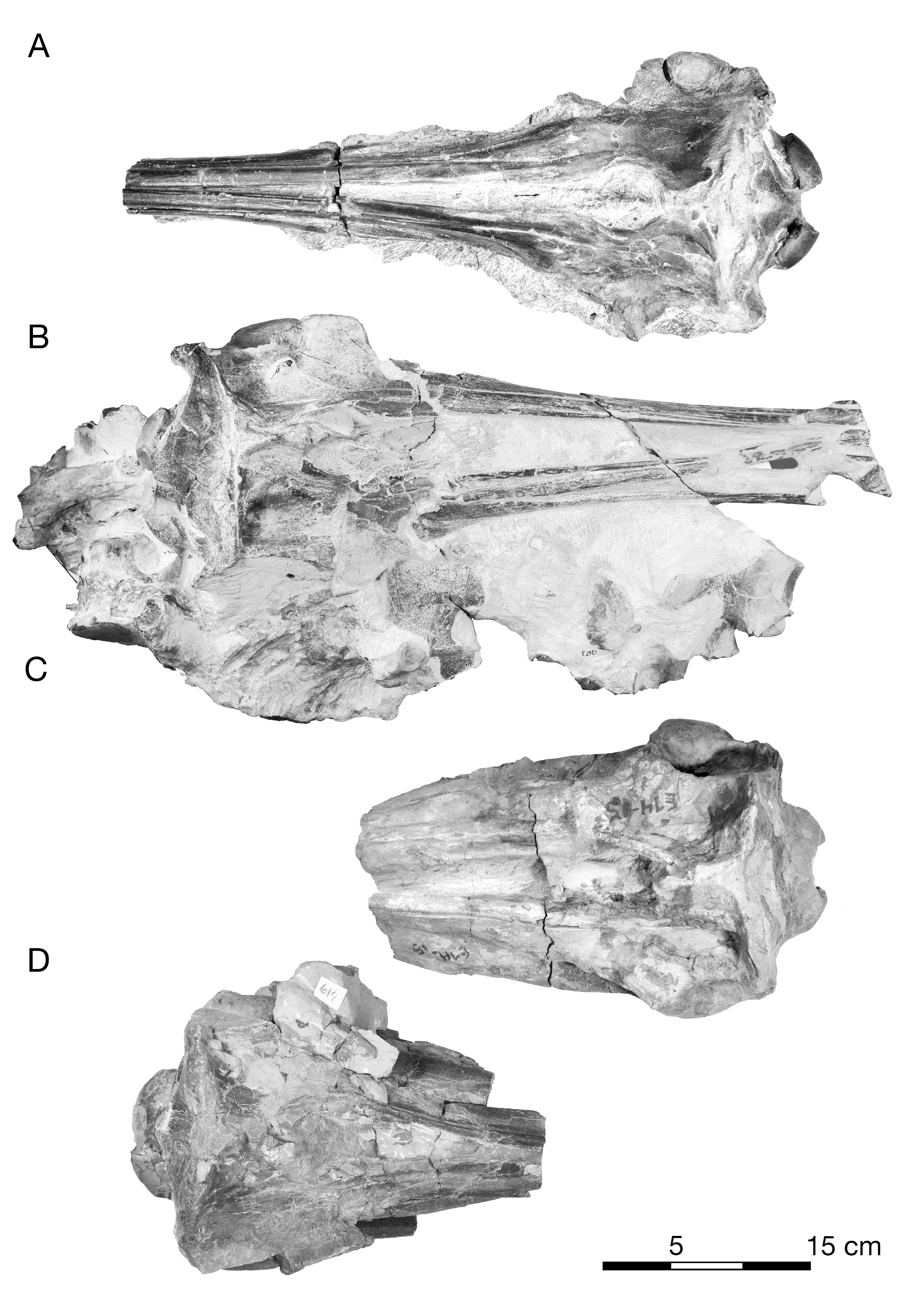
- Skulls assigned to Goedertius sp.

Scientific classification
- Kingdom: Animalia
- Phylum: Chordata
- Class: Mammalia
- Order: Artiodactyla
- Infraorder: Cetacea
- Superfamily: Platanistoidea
- Family: †Allodelphinidae
- Genus: †Goedertius; Kimura and Barnes, 2016
- Species: †G. oregonensis

Binomial name
- †Goedertius oregonensis Kimura and Barnes, 2016

= Goedertius =

Goedertius Temporal range: Miocene 20–19 Ma

Extinct genus of mammals

Goedertius is an extinct genus of river dolphin from the early Miocene (Burdigalian) Nye Formation of Oregon.

== Description ==
Goedertius is distinguished from other allodelphinids by a depression on the posterior part of the rostrum, smaller nasal bones, wider dorsal opening of mesorostral canal on posterior part of rostrum, and dorsal exposures of frontals at cranial vertex smaller.
