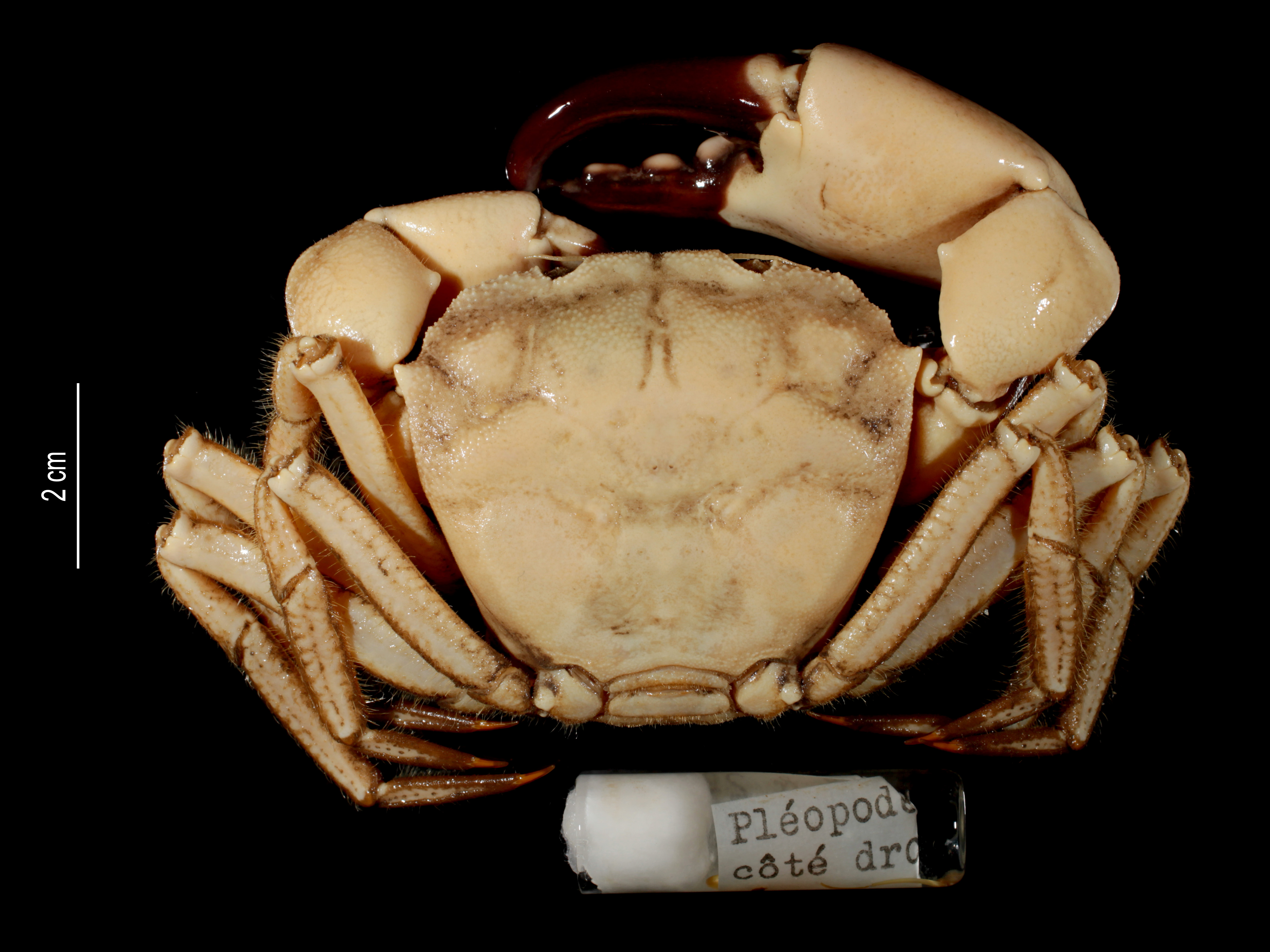
- Progeryon guinotae

Scientific classification
- Kingdom: Animalia
- Phylum: Arthropoda
- Clade: Pancrustacea
- Class: Malacostraca
- Order: Decapoda
- Suborder: Pleocyemata
- Infraorder: Brachyura
- Section: Eubrachyura
- Subsection: Heterotremata
- Superfamily: Goneplacoidea
- Family: Progeryonidae; Števčić, 2005

= Progeryonidae =

Family of crabs

Progeryonidae is a small family of crabs. Until 2005, they were included in the Goneplacidae as part of the subfamily Carcinoplacinae. Three genera are included:

- Paragalene Kossmann, 1878
- Progeryon Bouvier, 1922
- Rhadinoplax Castro & Ng, 2008
