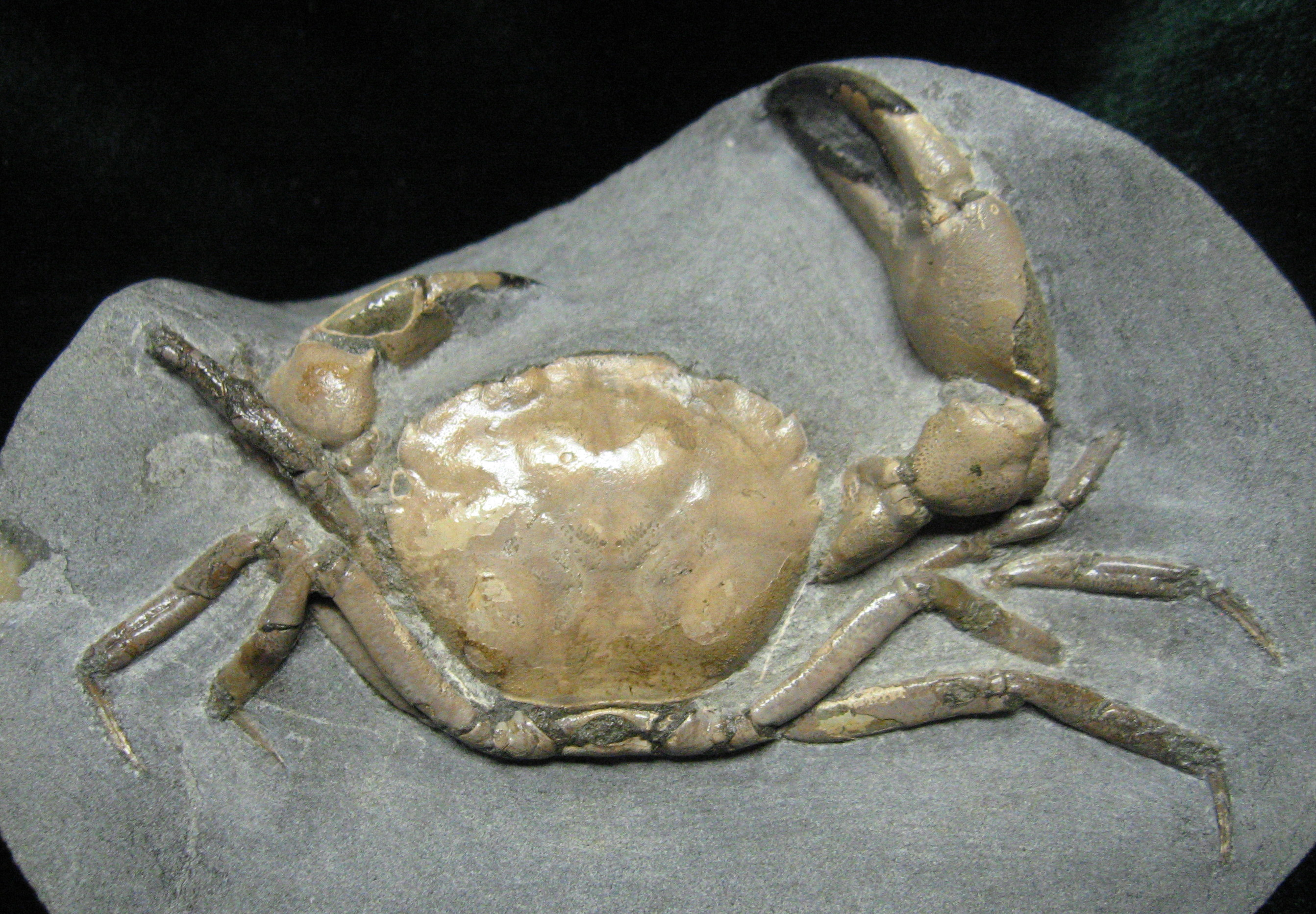
- †Branchioplax washingtoniana

Scientific classification
- Kingdom: Animalia
- Phylum: Arthropoda
- Class: Malacostraca
- Order: Decapoda
- Suborder: Pleocyemata
- Infraorder: Brachyura
- Section: Eubrachyura
- Subsection: Heterotremata
- Superfamily: Goneplacoidea
- Family: Mathildellidae; Karasawa & Kato, 2003

= Mathildellidae =

Family of crabs

Mathildellidae is family of crabs belonging to the superfamily Goneplacoidea, containing the following genera:

- Beuroisia Guinot & Richer de Forges, 1981
- †Branchioplax Rathbun, 1916
- †Coeloma A. Milne-Edwards, 1865
- Intesius Guinot & Richer de Forges, 1981
- Mathildella Guinot & Richer de Forges, 1981
- Neopilumnoplax Serène, 1969
- Platypilumnus Alcock, 1894
- †Tehuacana Stenzel, 1944
