= Ninjadelphis =

Ninjadelphis Temporal range: Miocene 17 Ma

Scientific classification
- Kingdom: Animalia
- Phylum: Chordata
- Class: Mammalia
- Order: Artiodactyla
- Infraorder: Cetacea
- Superfamily: Platanistoidea
- Family: †Allodelphinidae
- Genus: †Ninjadelphis; Kimura and Barnes, 2016
- Species: †N. ujiharai

Binomial name
- †Ninjadelphis ujiharai Kimura and Barnes, 2016

Extinct genus of mammals

Ninjadelphis is an extinct genus of river dolphin from the early Miocene (Burdigalian) of Japan.

The generic name refers to the fact that the type locality, Iga, was a training center in Japan for ninja warriors.

== Description ==
Ninjadelphis is distinguished from other allodelphinids by having a trapezoidal shaped exposure of frontals on cranial vertex, a nuchal crest partly overhanging posterior end of maxilla, a wider basioccipital, and basioccipital crests widely diverging posteriorly .
