= Zarhinocetus =

Zarhinocetus Temporal range: Early-Middle Miocene, 17–14.5 Ma

Scientific classification
- Domain: Eukaryota
- Kingdom: Animalia
- Phylum: Chordata
- Class: Mammalia
- Order: Artiodactyla
- Infraorder: Cetacea
- Family: †Allodelphinidae; Barnes, 2006
- Genus: †Zarhinocetus; Barnes and Reynolds, 2009

Species
- Z. donnamatsonae Kimura and Barnes, 2016; Z. errabundus (Kellogg, 1931) (type)

Extinct genus of mammals

Zarhinocetus is an extinct genus of whale from the Early to Middle Miocene of the eastern North Pacific.

== Description ==
Zarhinocetus is a member of Allodelphinidae, a family of primitive dolphins related to the South Asian river dolphin, measuring 3.5–5 metres (11–16 ft) in length. The rostrum is narrow and elongated, and the teeth are both polydont and heterodont. Zarhinocetus is distinguished from other allodelphinids in having a depressed medial part of dorsal surface of proximal part of rostrum, enlarged tubercle present on dorsolateral surface of maxilla anterior to antorbital notch, supraorbital process of frontal thicker dorsoventrally, anteroposteriorly-oriented crest present on dorsal surface of supraorbital process of maxilla, bony orbit of larger diameter, dorsal exposures of frontals on cranial vertex asymmetrical with midline suture located to left of cranial midline, zygomatic process of squamosal nearly rectangular in lateral view rather than arc shaped, nuchal crest curving anteriorly at apex posterior to cranial vertex, occipital shield larger and more vertically oriented, occipital condyles proportionally larger; petrosal more massive, with anterior process more robust, posterior process shorter, posterior articular facet for tympanic bulla smaller; tympanic bulla with outer lip more inflated.

== Taxonomy ==
The type species, Zarhinocetus errabundus, was originally described as a new species of Squalodon, S. errabundus. Later authors recognized it as generically distinct from Squalodon, and in 2009 the name Zarhinocetus was coined for S. errabundus.

== Biology ==
The nature of the sediments in which Zarhinocetus has been found denotes a neritic environment for the genus. The advanced degree of telescoping in the cranium shows that it could track prey using echolocation.
