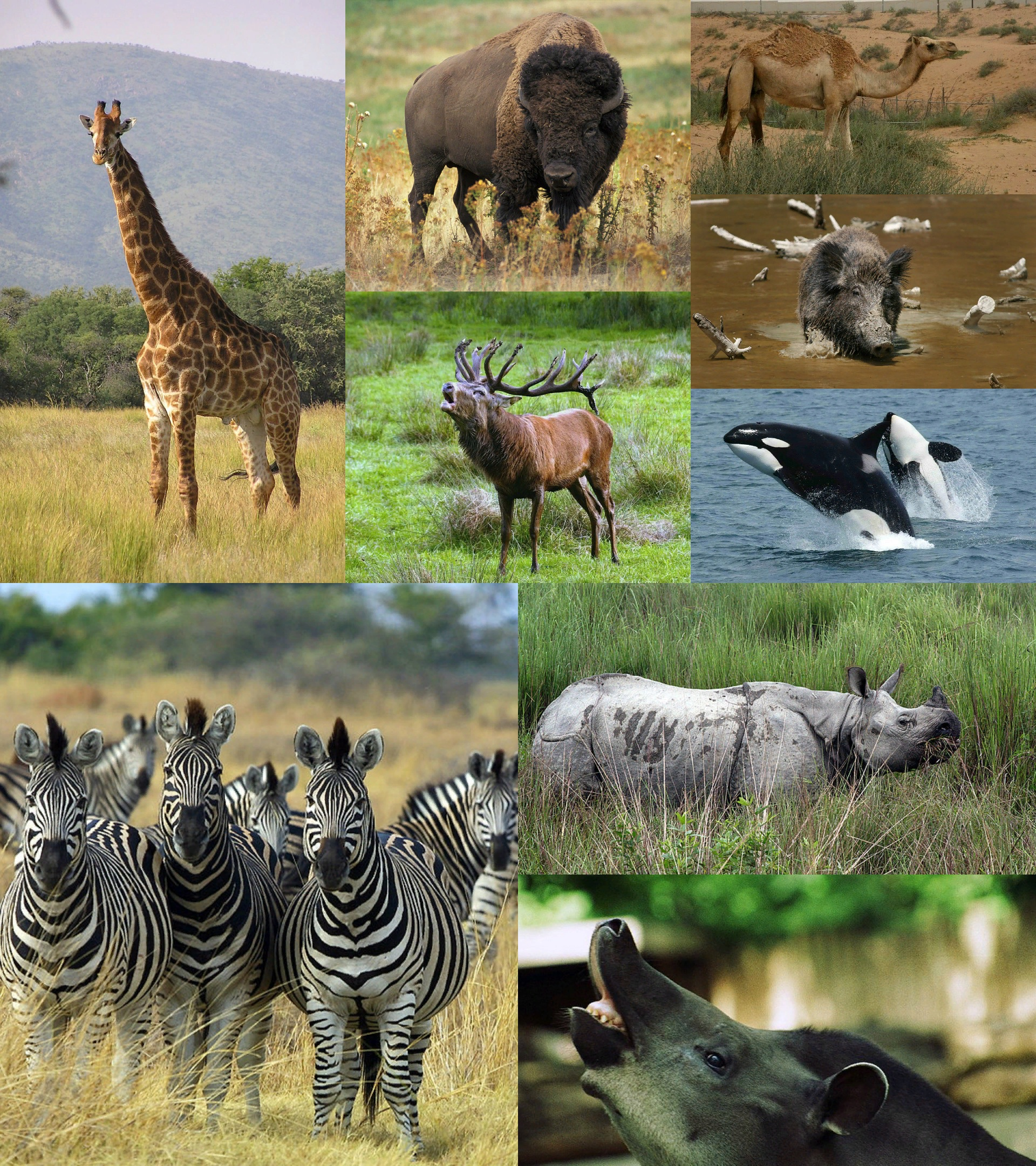
- Image from top to left with artiodactyls at the top and Perissodactyla at the bottom: South African giraffe, plains bison, dromedary, red deer, wild boar, orca (Cetacea), plains zebra, Indian rhinoceros, and Brazilian tapir.

Scientific classification
- Kingdom: Animalia
- Phylum: Chordata
- Class: Mammalia
- Clade: Pan-Euungulata
- Mirorder: Euungulata; Waddell et al., 2001

Orders and clades
- Clade: Panperissodactyla; Family: †Phenacodontidae?; Clade: †Anthracobunia; Order: †Desmostylia(?); Clade: †Litopterna; Clade: †Notoungulata; Order: Perissodactyla; Clade: Total group Artiodactyla; Order: †Arctocyonia?; Family: †Periptychidae?; Order: Artiodactyla

Synonyms
- Cetungulata Irwin & Wilson, 1993; Ungulata Linnaeus, 1766 sensu Archibald, 2020

= Ungulate =

Ungulate Temporal range: Paleocene–present

Group of mammals that walk on the tips of their toes or hooves

Ungulates (Note: /ˈʌŋɡjʊleɪts, -ɡjə-, -lɪts, -ləts/, UNG-gyuu-layts, -gyə-, -lits, -ləts) are members of the diverse clade Euungulata, (Note: /juːˌʌŋɡjʊˈleɪtə/, yoo-UNG-gyuu-LAY-tə; lit. 'true ungulates') which primarily consists of large mammals with hooves. Once part of the taxon "Ungulata" along with paenungulates and tubulidentates, as well as several extinct taxa, "Ungulata" has since been determined to be a polyphyletic grouping based on molecular data. As a result, true ungulates have since been reclassified to the newer clade Euungulata in 2001 within the clade Laurasiatheria, while Paenungulata and Tubulidentata have been reclassified to the distant clade Afrotheria. Alternatively, some authors use the name Ungulata to designate the same clade as Euungulata.

Living ungulates are divided into two orders:

- Odd-toed Perissodactyla including equines, rhinoceroses, and tapirs.
- Even-toed Artiodactyla including cattle, antelope, pigs, giraffes, camels, sheep, deer, and hippopotamuses, among others.

Cetaceans such as whales, dolphins, and porpoises are also classified as artiodactyls, although they do not have hooves.

Most terrestrial ungulates use the hoofed tips of their toes to support their body weight while standing or moving. Two other orders of ungulates, Notoungulata and Litopterna, both native to South America, became extinct at the end of the Pleistocene, around 12,000 years ago.

The term means, roughly, "being hoofed" or "hoofed animal". As a descriptive term, "ungulate" normally excludes cetaceans as they do not possess most of the typical morphological characteristics of other ungulates, but they were also descended from early artiodactyls. Ungulates are typically herbivorous and many employ specialized gut bacteria to enable them to digest cellulose, though some members may deviate from this: several species of pigs and the extinct entelodonts are omnivorous, while cetaceans are carnivorous.

== Etymology ==
Ungulate is from the Late Latin adjective ungulatus 'hoofed', from ungula 'hoof', a diminutive of unguis 'nail' (finger nail; toe nail).

== Classifications ==
=== History ===
Euungulata is a clade (or in some taxonomies, a grand order) of mammals. The two extant orders of ungulates are the Perissodactyla (odd-toed ungulates) and Artiodactyla (even-toed ungulates). Hyracoidea (hyraxes), Sirenia (sea cows, dugongs and manatees), Proboscidea (elephants) and Tubulidentata (aardvarks) were in the past grouped within the clade "Ungulata", later found to be a polyphyletic and invalid. The three orders of Paenungulata are considered a clade and grouped in the Afrotheria clade, along with Tubulidentata, while Euungulata is grouped under the Laurasiatheria clade.

In 2009, morphological and molecular work found that aardvarks, hyraxes, sea cows, and elephants were more closely related to each other and to sengis, tenrecs, and golden moles than to the perissodactyls and artiodactyls, and form the clade Afrotheria. Elephants, sea cows, and hyraxes were grouped together in the clade Paenungulata, while the aardvark has been considered as either a close relative to them or a close relative to sengis in the clade Afroinsectiphilia. This is a striking example of convergent evolution.

There is some dispute as to whether this smaller Euungulata is a cladistic (evolution-based) group, or merely a phenetic group (form taxon) or folk taxon (similar, but not necessarily related). Some studies have indeed found the mesaxonian ungulates and paraxonian ungulates to form a monophyletic lineage, closely related to either the Ferae (the carnivorans and the pangolins) in the clade Fereuungulata or to the bats. Other studies found the two orders not that closely related, as some place the perissodactyls as close relatives to bats and Ferae in Pegasoferae and others place the artiodactyls as close relatives to bats.

=== Taxonomy ===
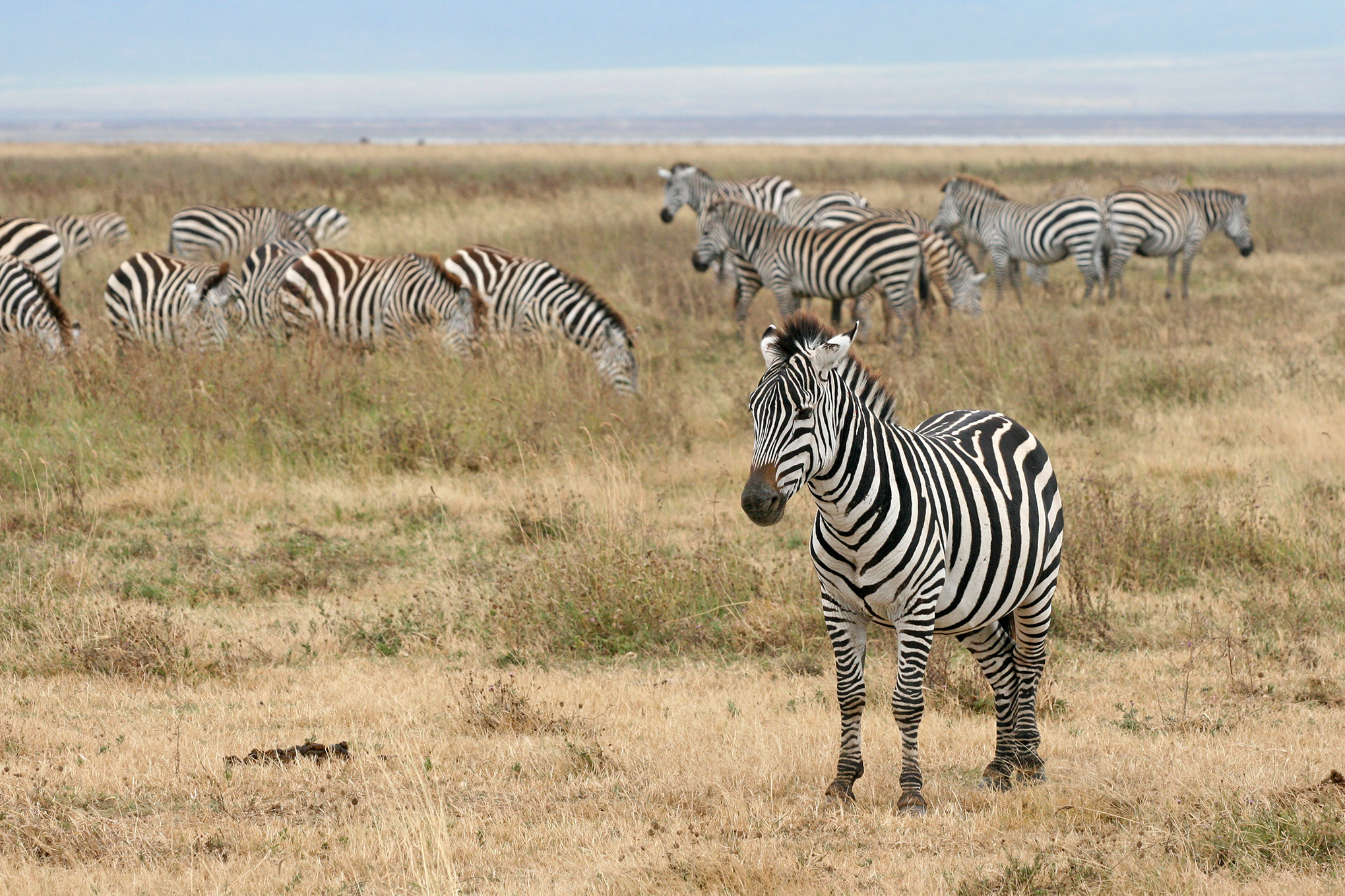
Plains zebra

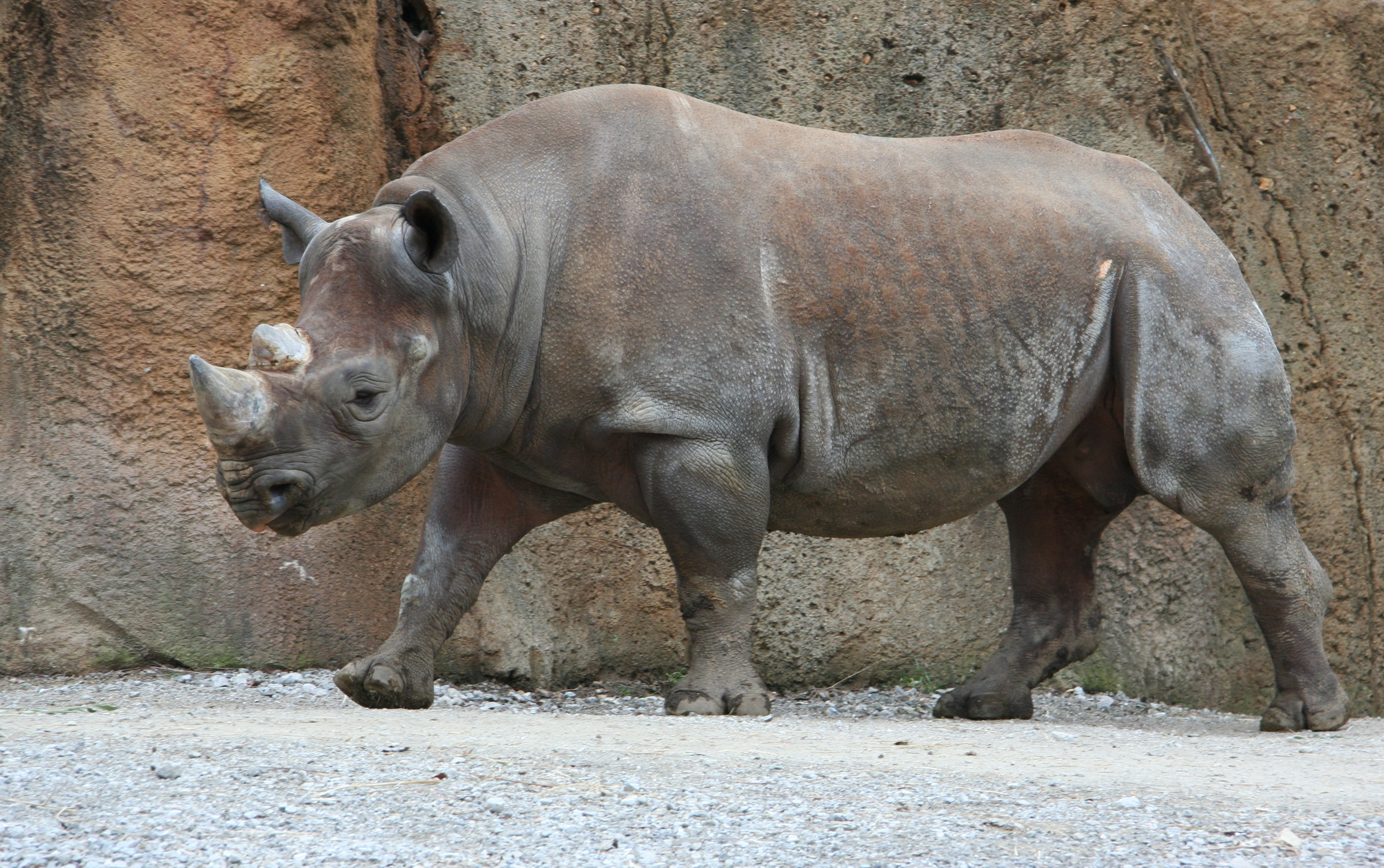
Black rhinoceros

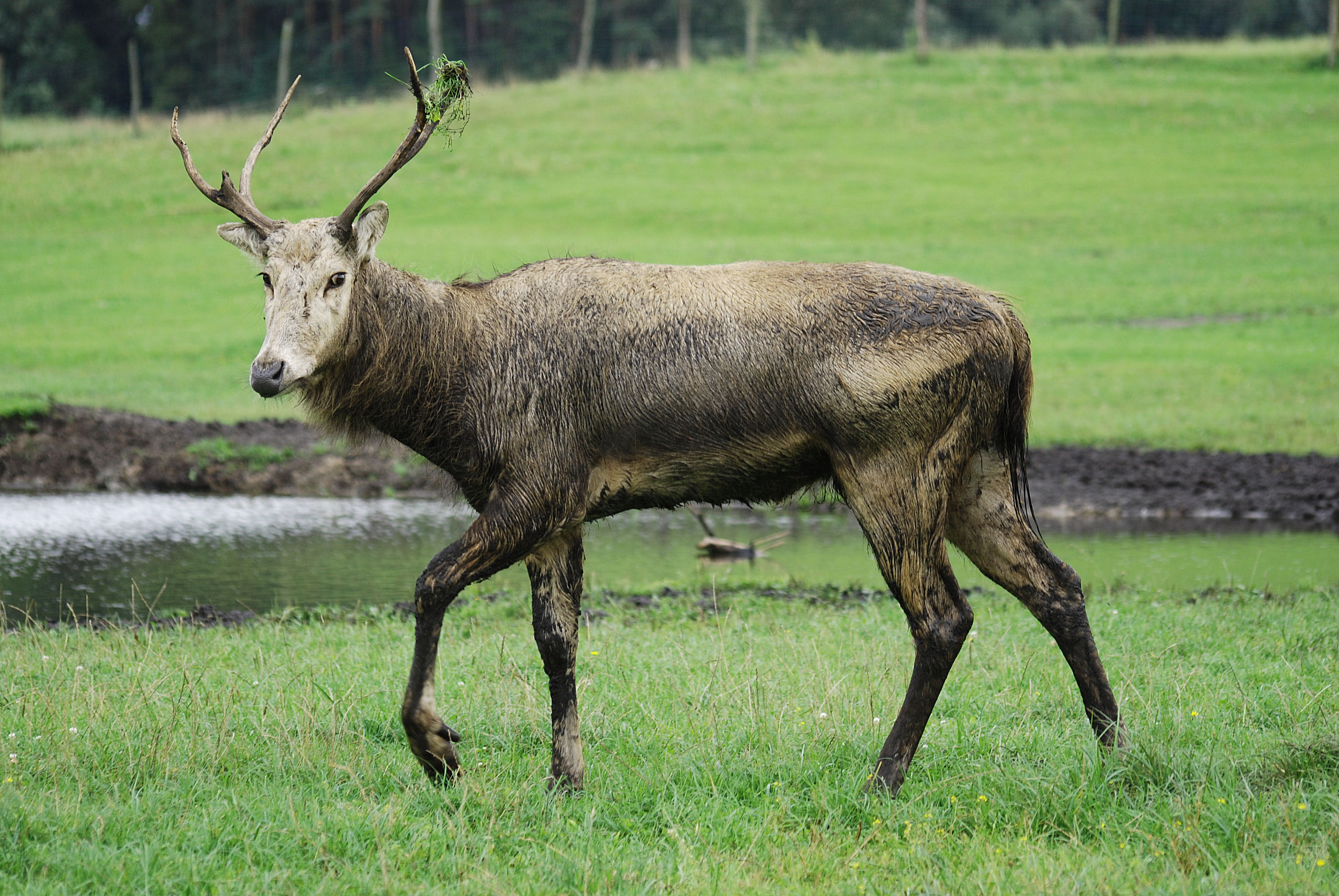
Père David's deer

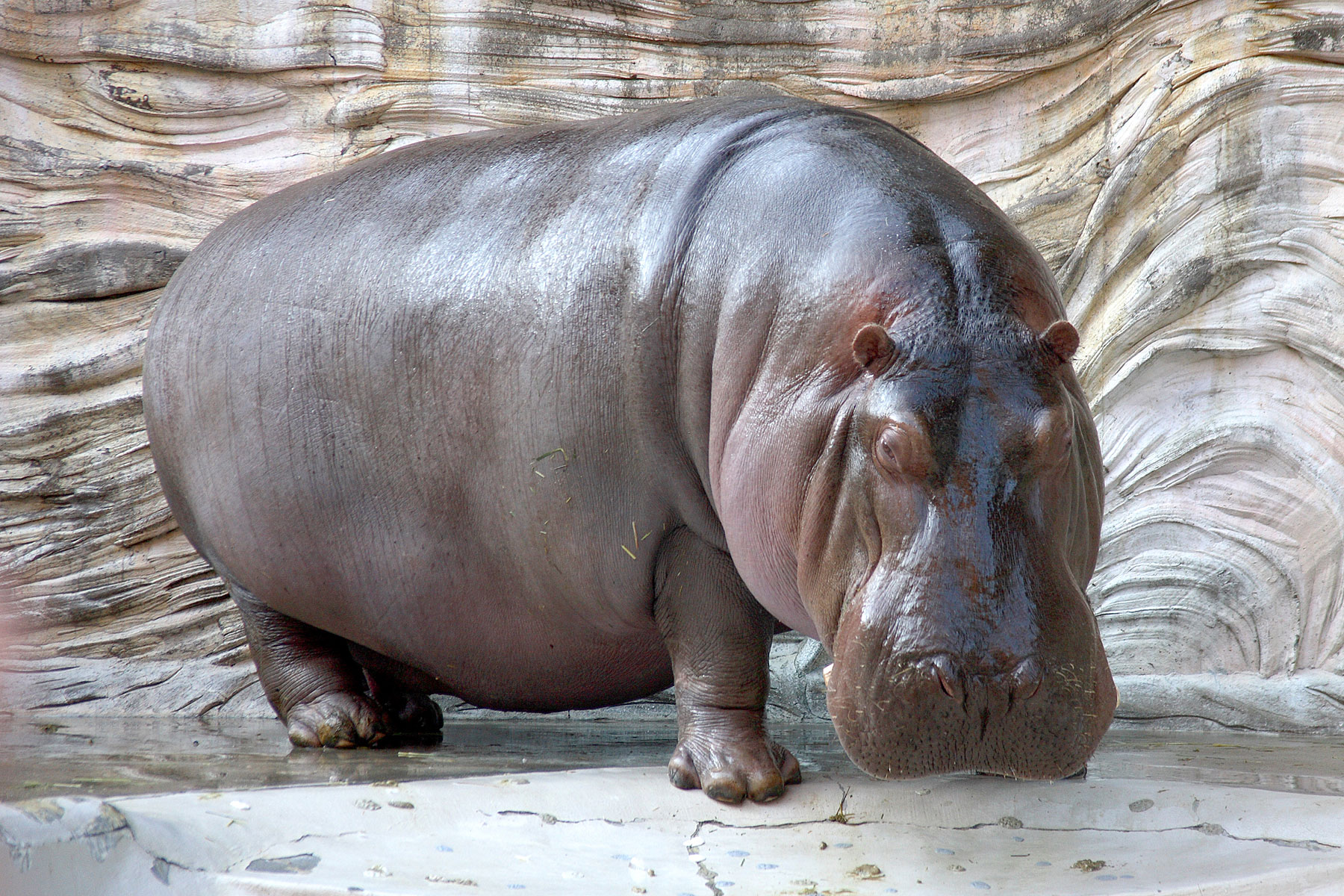
Hippopotamus

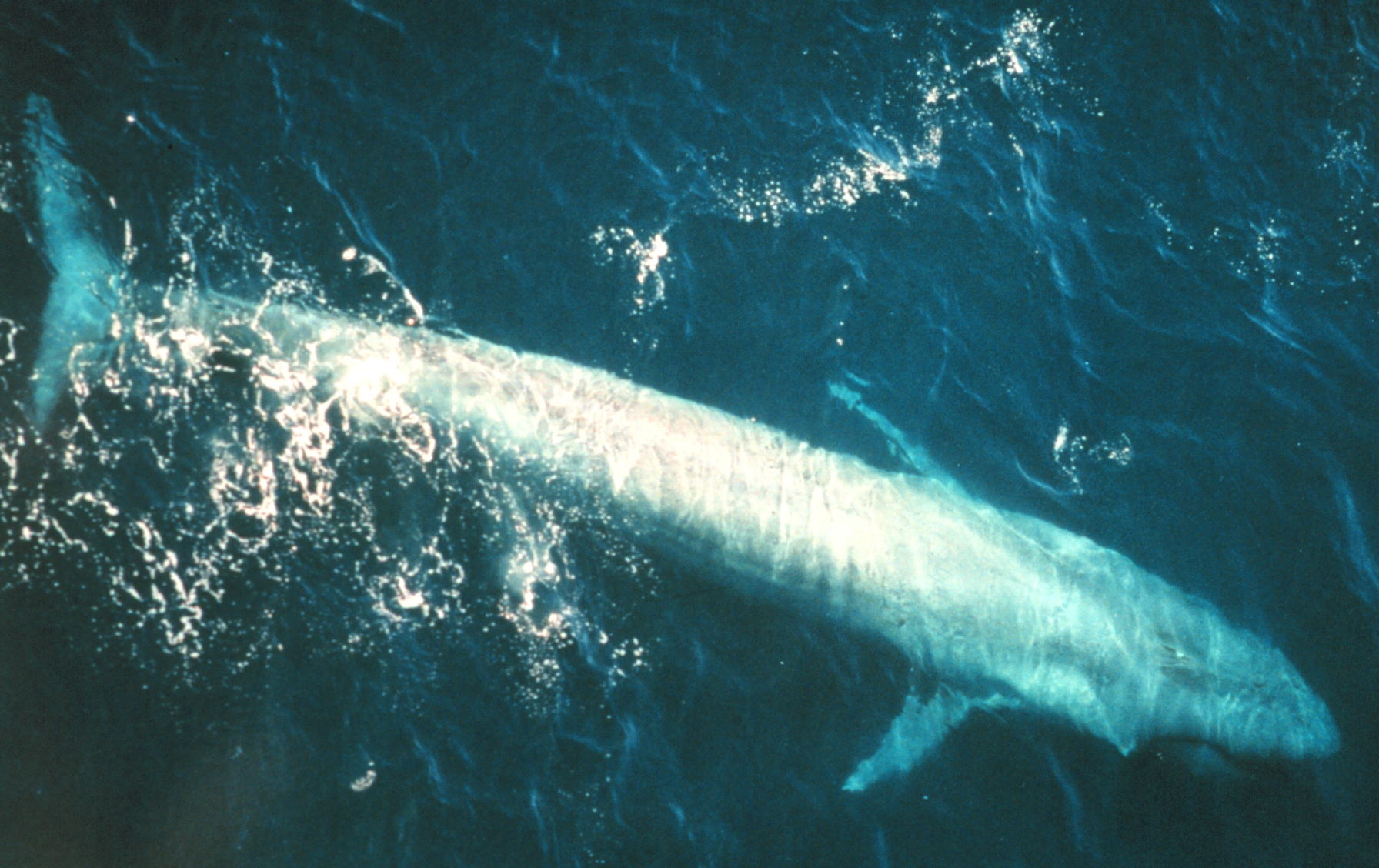
Blue whale

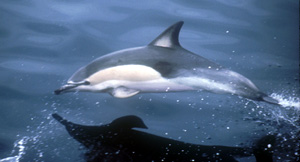
Common dolphin

Below is a simplified taxonomy (assuming that ungulates do indeed form a natural grouping) with the extant families, in order of the relationships. Keep in mind that there were still some grey areas of conflict, such as the case with the relationship between the pecoran families and the baleen whale families. See each family for the relationships of the species as well as the controversies in their respective articles.

- Euungulata
  - Perissodactyla (Mesaxonian ungulates)
    - Hippomorpha
      - Equidae: Horses, asses and zebras
    - Ceratomorpha
      - Tapiridae: Tapirs
      - Rhinocerotidae: Rhinoceroses
  - Artiodactyla (= Cetartiodactyla) (Paraxonian ungulates)
    - Tylopoda
      - Camelidae: Camels and llamas
    - Artiofabula
      - Suina
        - Tayassuidae: Peccaries
        - Suidae: Pigs
      - Cetruminantia
        - Ruminantia
          - Tragulidae: Chevrotains
          - Cervoidea
            - Antilocapridae: Pronghorn
            - Giraffidae: Giraffes and okapi
            - Cervidae: Deer
            - Moschidae: Musk deer
            - Bovidae: Cattle and antelopes
        - Whippomorpha
          - Hippopotamidae: Hippopotamuses
          - Cetacea
            - Mysticeti
              - Balaenidae: Bowhead and right whales
              - Cetotheriidae: Pygmy right whale
              - Balaenopteridae: Rorquals
            - Odontoceti
              - Physeteroidea
                - Physeteridae: Sperm whale
                - Kogiidae: Lesser sperm whales
              - Platanistoidea
                - Platanistidae: Indian river dolphins
              - Ziphioidea
                - Ziphiidae: Beaked whales
              - Lipotoidea
                - Lipotidae: Baiji (functionally extinct)
              - Inioidea
                - Iniidae: Amazonian river dolphins
                - Pontoporiidae: La Plata dolphin
              - Delphinoidea
                - Monodontidae: Beluga and narwhal
                - Phocoenidae: Porpoises
                - Delphinidae: Oceanic dolphins

=== Phylogeny ===
Below is the general consensus of the phylogeny of the ungulate families.

- Euungulata
  - Perissodactyla
    - Equidae
    - - Tapiridae
      - Rhinocerotidae
  - Artiodactyla
    - Tylopoda
      Camelidae
    - Artiofabula
      - Suina
        - Tayassuidae
        - Suidae
      - Cetruminantia
        - Ruminantia
          - Tragulidae
          - - Antilocapridae
            - - Giraffidae
              - - Cervidae
                - - Moschidae
                  - Bovidae
        - Whippomorpha
          - Hippopotamidae
          - - Cetacea
              - Mysticeti
                - Balaenidae
                - - Cetotheriidae
                  - Balaenopteridae
              - Odontoceti
                - - Physeteridae
                  - Kogiidae
                - - Platanistidae
                  - - Ziphiidae
                    - - †Lipotidae
                      - - - Pontoporiidae
                          - Iniidae
                        - - Delphinidae
                          - - Phocoenidae
                            - Monodontidae

== Evolutionary history ==
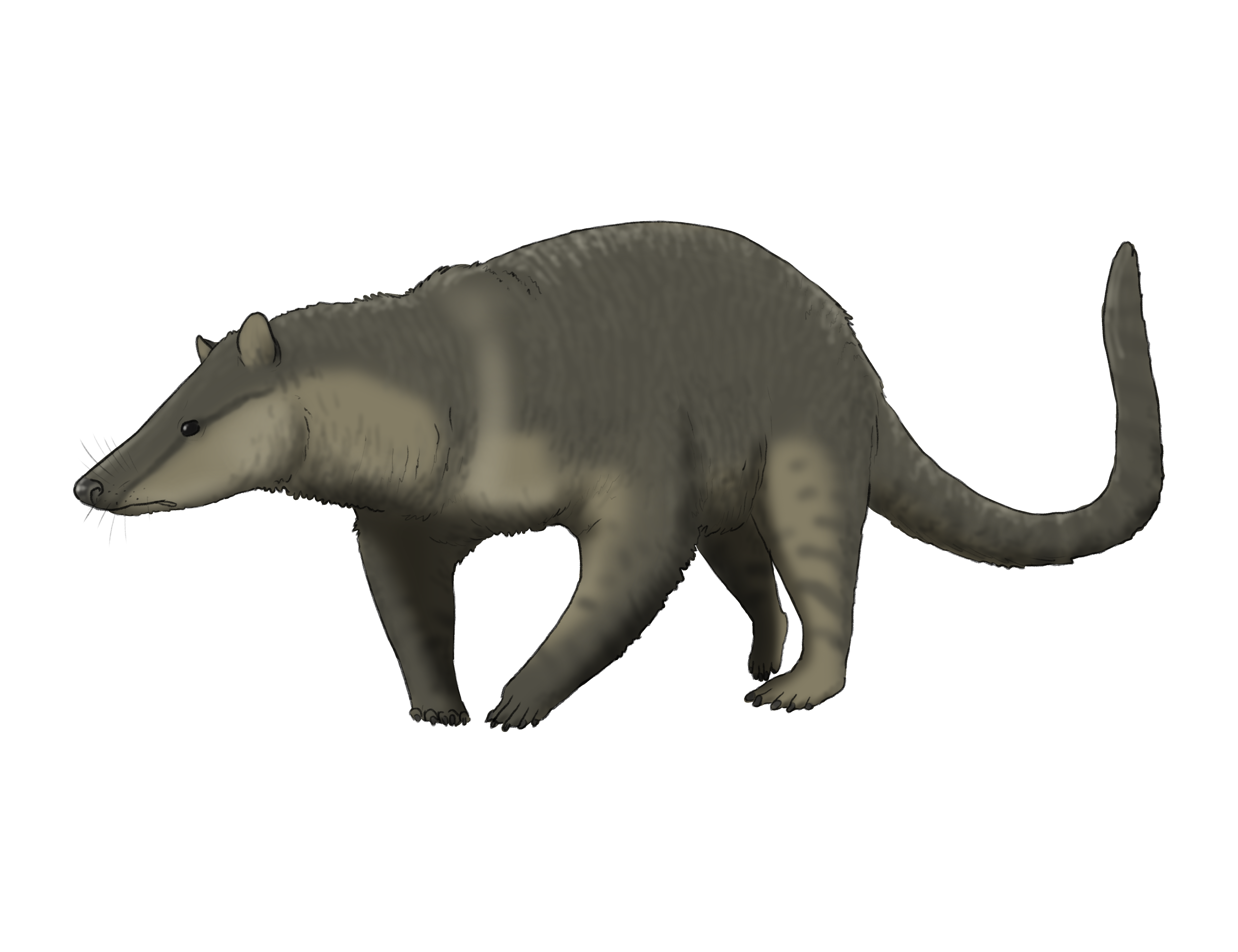
Speculative reconstruction of the controversial Protungulatum

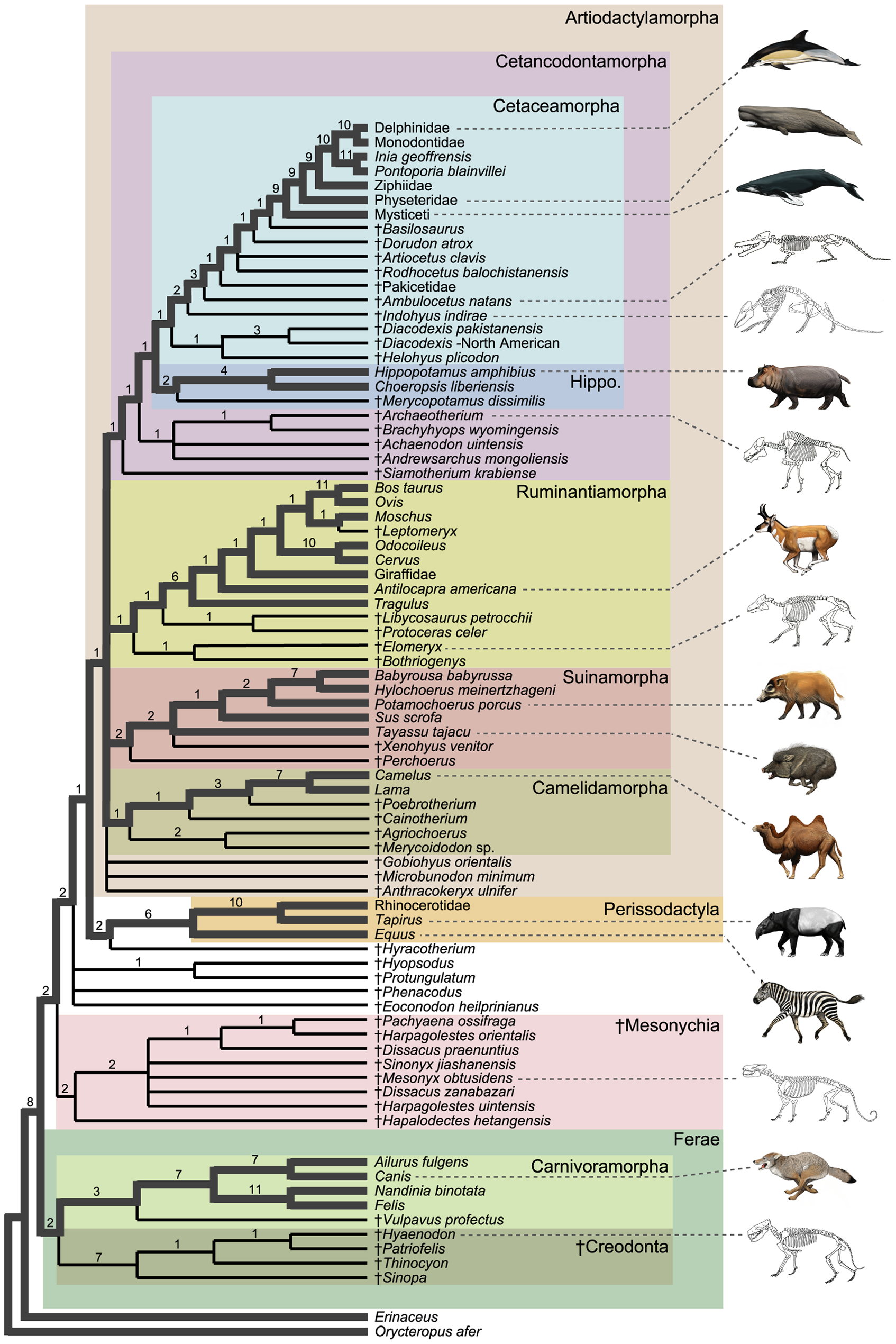
Cladogram showing relationships within Euungulata

Perissodactyla and Artiodactyla include the majority of large land mammals. These two groups first appeared during the late Paleocene, rapidly spreading to a wide variety of species on numerous continents, and have developed in parallel since that time. Some scientists believed that modern ungulates were descended from an evolutionary grade of mammals known as the condylarths. The earliest known member of this group may have been the tiny Protungulatum, a mammal that co-existed with the last of non-avian dinosaurs 66 million years ago. However, many authorities do not consider it a true placental, let alone an ungulate. The enigmatic dinoceratans were among the first large herbivorous mammals, although their exact relationship with other mammals is still debated with one of the theories being that they might just be distant relatives to living ungulates; the most recent study recovers them as within the true ungulate assemblage, closest to Carodnia.

In Australia, the recently extinct marsupial Chaeropus ("pig-footed bandicoot") also developed hooves similar to those of artiodactyls, an example of convergent evolution.

=== Perissodactyl evolution ===
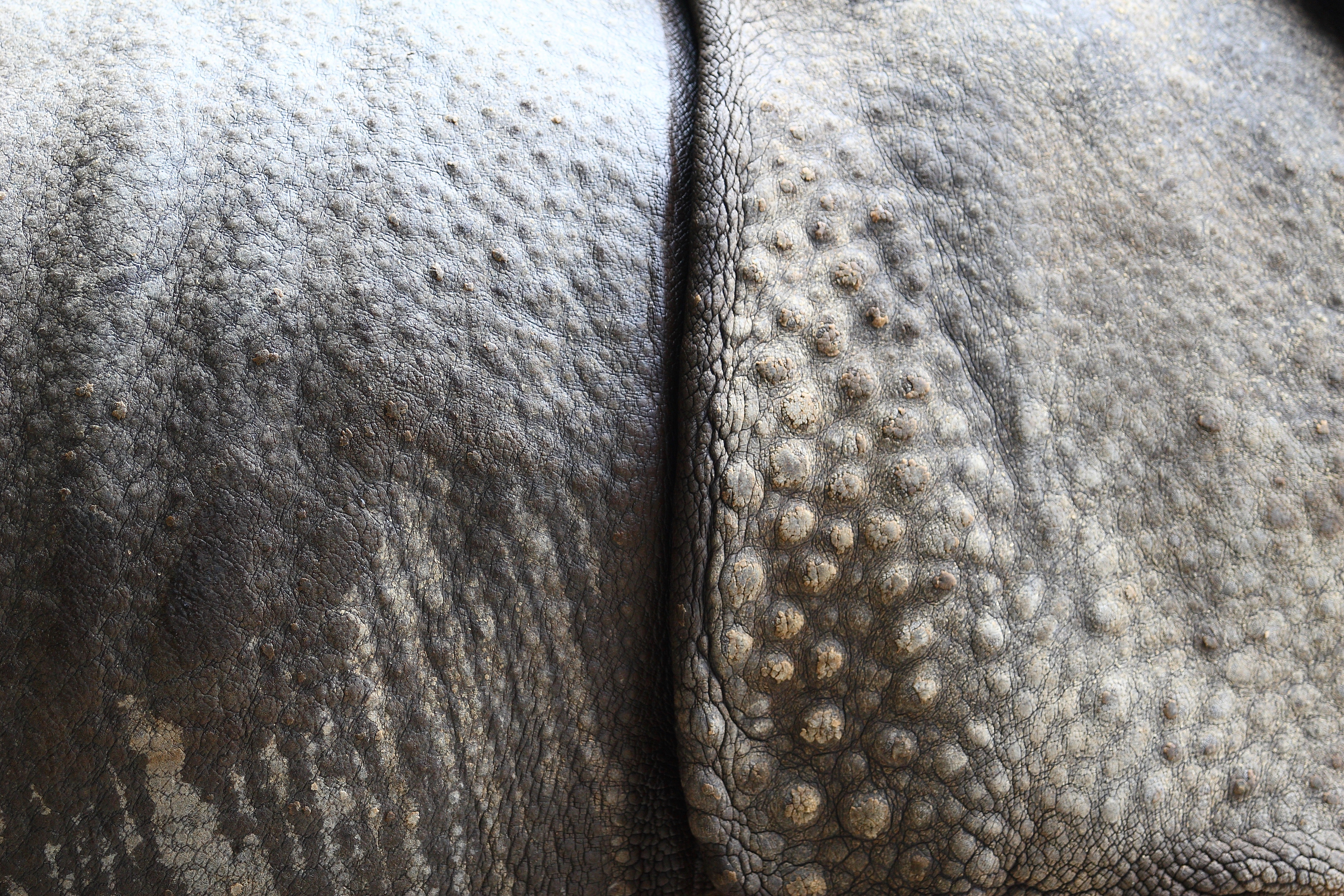
The thick dermal armour of the Rhinoceros evolved at the same time as shearing tusks.

Perissodactyls were thought to have evolved from the Phenacodontidae, small, sheep-sized animals that were already showing signs of anatomical features that their descendants would inherit (the reduction of digit I and V for example). By the start of the Eocene, 55 million years ago (Mya), they had diversified and spread out to occupy several continents. Horses and tapirs both evolved in North America; rhinoceroses appear to have developed in Asia from tapir-like animals and then colonised the Americas during the middle Eocene (about 45 Mya). Of the approximately 15 families, only three survive (McKenna and Bell, 1997; Hooker, 2005). These families were very diverse in form and size; they included the enormous brontotheres and the bizarre chalicotheres. The largest perissodactyl, an Asian rhinoceros called Paraceratherium, reached 15 tonnes (17 tons), more than twice the weight of an elephant.

It has been found in a cladistic study that the anthracobunids and the desmostylians – two lineages that have been previously classified as Afrotherians (more specifically closer to elephants) – have been classified as a clade that is closely related to the perissodactyls. The desmostylians were large amphibious quadrupeds with massive limbs and a short tail. They grew to 1.8 metres (6 ft) in length and were thought to have weighed more than 200 kilograms (440 lb). Their fossils were known from the northern Pacific Rim, from southern Japan through Russia, the Aleutian Islands and the Pacific coast of North America to the southern tip of Baja California. Their dental and skeletal form suggests desmostylians were aquatic herbivores dependent on littoral habitats. Their name refers to their highly distinctive molars, in which each cusp was modified into hollow columns, so that a typical molar would have resembled a cluster of pipes, or in the case of worn molars, volcanoes. They were the only marine mammals to have gone extinct.

The South American meridiungulates contain the somewhat tapir-like pyrotheres and astrapotheres, the mesaxonic litopterns and the diverse notoungulates. As a whole, meridiungulates were said to have evolved from animals like Hyopsodus. For a while their relationships with other ungulates were a mystery. Some paleontologists have even challenged the monophyly of Meridiungulata by suggesting that the pyrotheres may be more closely related to other mammals, such as Embrithopoda (an African order that were related to elephants) than to other South American ungulates. A recent study based on bone collagen has found that at least litopterns and the notoungulates were closely related to the perissodactyls.

The oldest known fossils assigned to Equidae date from the early Eocene, 54 million years ago. They had been assigned to the genus Hyracotherium, but the type species of that genus is now considered not a member of this family, but the other species have been split off into different genera. These early Equidae were fox-sized animals with three toes on the hind feet, and four on the front feet. They were herbivorous browsers on relatively soft plants, and were already adapted for running. The complexity of their brains suggest that they already were alert and intelligent animals. Later species reduced the number of toes, and developed teeth more suited for grinding up grass and other tough plant food.

Rhinocerotoids diverged from other perissodactyls by the early Eocene. Fossils of Hyrachyus eximus found in North America date to this period. This small hornless ancestor resembled a tapir or small horse more than a rhino. Three families, sometimes grouped together as the superfamily Rhinocerotoidea, evolved in the late Eocene: Hyracodontidae, Amynodontidae and Rhinocerotidae, thus creating an explosion of diversity unmatched for a while until environmental changes drastically eliminated several species.

The first tapirids, such as Heptodon, appeared in the early Eocene. They appeared very similar to modern forms, but were about half the size, and lacked the proboscis. The first true tapirs appeared in the Oligocene. By the Miocene, such genera as Miotapirus were almost indistinguishable from the extant species. Asian and American tapirs were believed to have diverged around 20 to 30 million years ago; and tapirs migrated from North America to South America around 3 million years ago, as part of the Great American Interchange.

Perissodactyls were the dominant group of large terrestrial browsers right through the Oligocene. However, the rise of grasses in the Miocene (about 20 Mya) saw a major change: the artiodactyl species with their more complex stomachs were better able to adapt to a coarse, low-nutrition diet, and soon rose to prominence. Nevertheless, many perissodactyl species survived and prospered until the late Pleistocene (about 10,000 years ago) when they faced the pressure of human hunting and habitat change.

=== Artiodactyl evolution ===
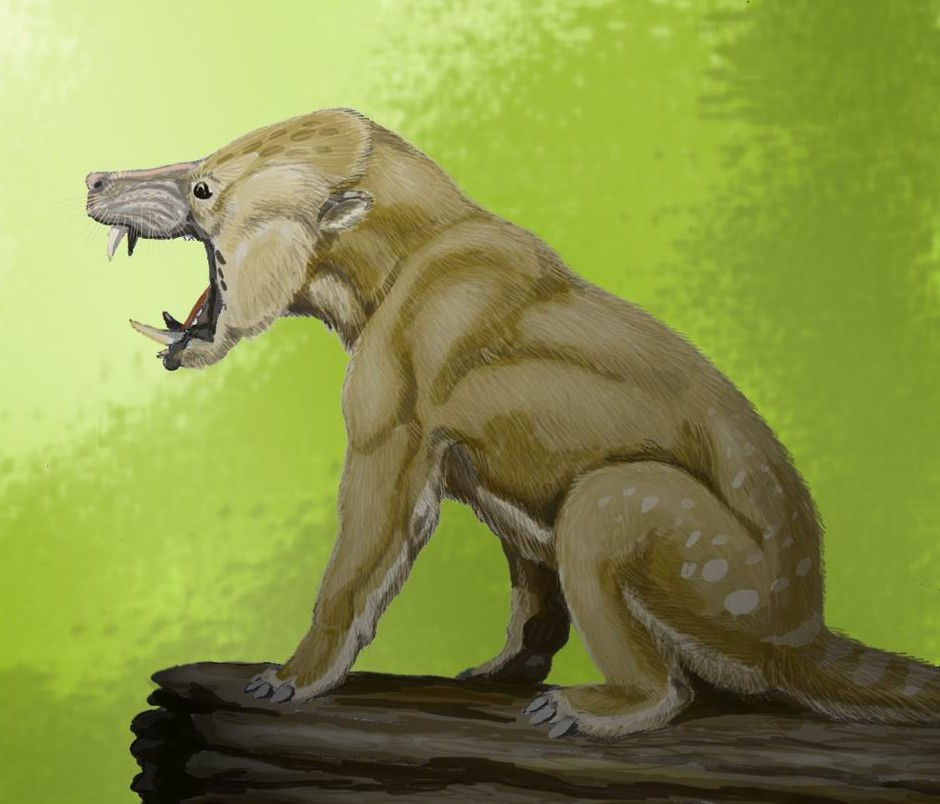
Arctocyon, an arctocyonid

The artiodactyls were thought to have evolved from a small group of condylarths, Arctocyonidae, which were unspecialized, superficially raccoon-like to bear-like omnivores from the Early Paleocene (about 65 to 60 million years ago). They had relatively short limbs lacking specializations associated with their relatives (e.g. reduced side digits, fused bones, and hooves), and long, heavy tails. Their primitive anatomy makes it unlikely that they were able to run down prey, but with their powerful proportions, claws, and long canines, they may have been able to overpower smaller animals in surprise attacks. Evidently these mammals soon evolved into two separate lineages: the mesonychians and the artiodactyls.

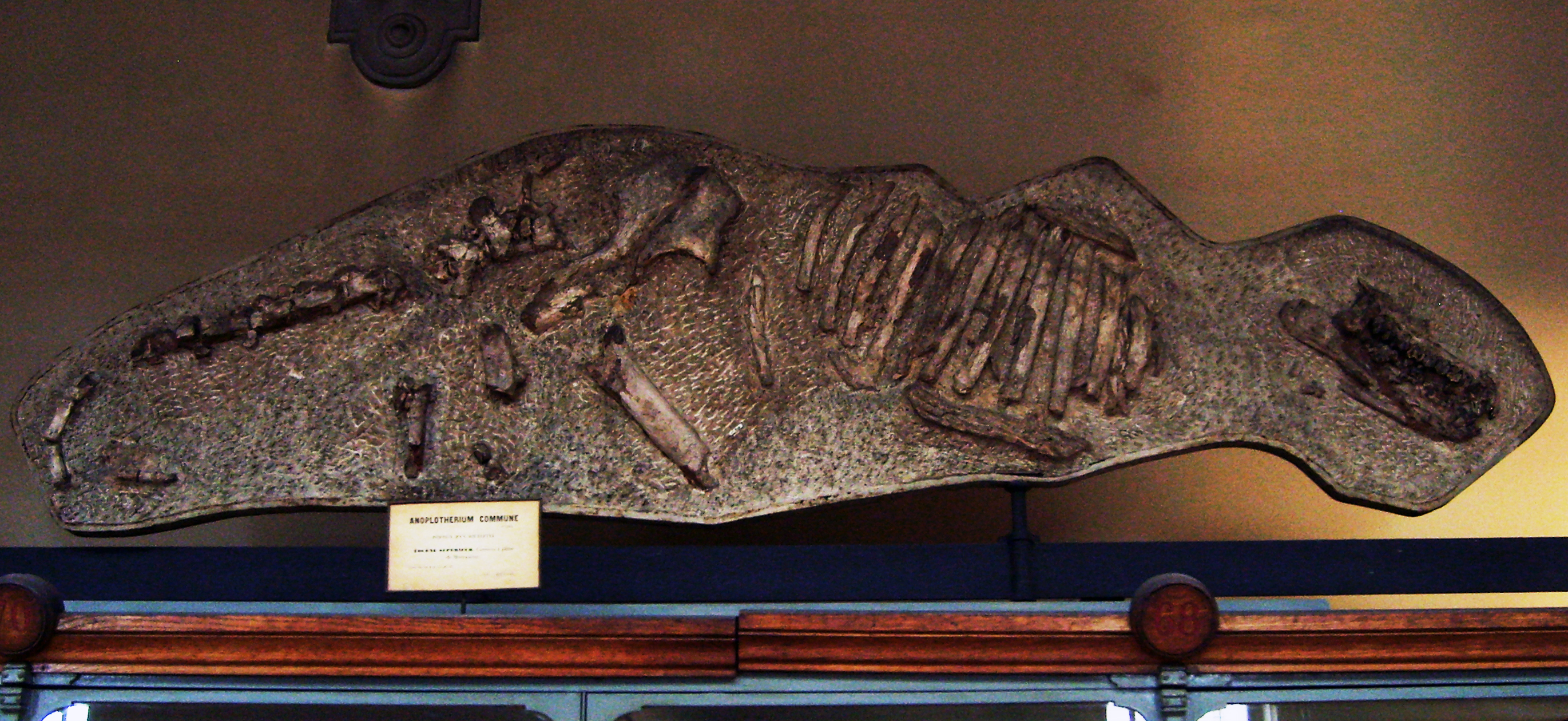
Skeleton of Anoplotherium commune, an early artiodactyl with unusual features such as a long tail

The first artiodactyls looked like today's chevrotains or pigs: small, short-legged creatures that ate leaves and the soft parts of plants. By the Late Eocene (46 million years ago), the three modern suborders had already developed: Suina (the pig group); Tylopoda (the camel group); and Ruminantia (the goat and cattle group). Nevertheless, artiodactyls were far from dominant at that time: the perissodactyls were much more successful and far more numerous. Artiodactyls survived in niche roles, usually occupying marginal habitats, and it is presumably at that time that they developed their complex digestive systems, which allowed them to survive on lower-grade food. While most artiodactyls were taking over the niches left behind by several extinct perissodactyls, one lineage of artiodactyls began to venture out into the seas.

==== Cetacean evolution ====
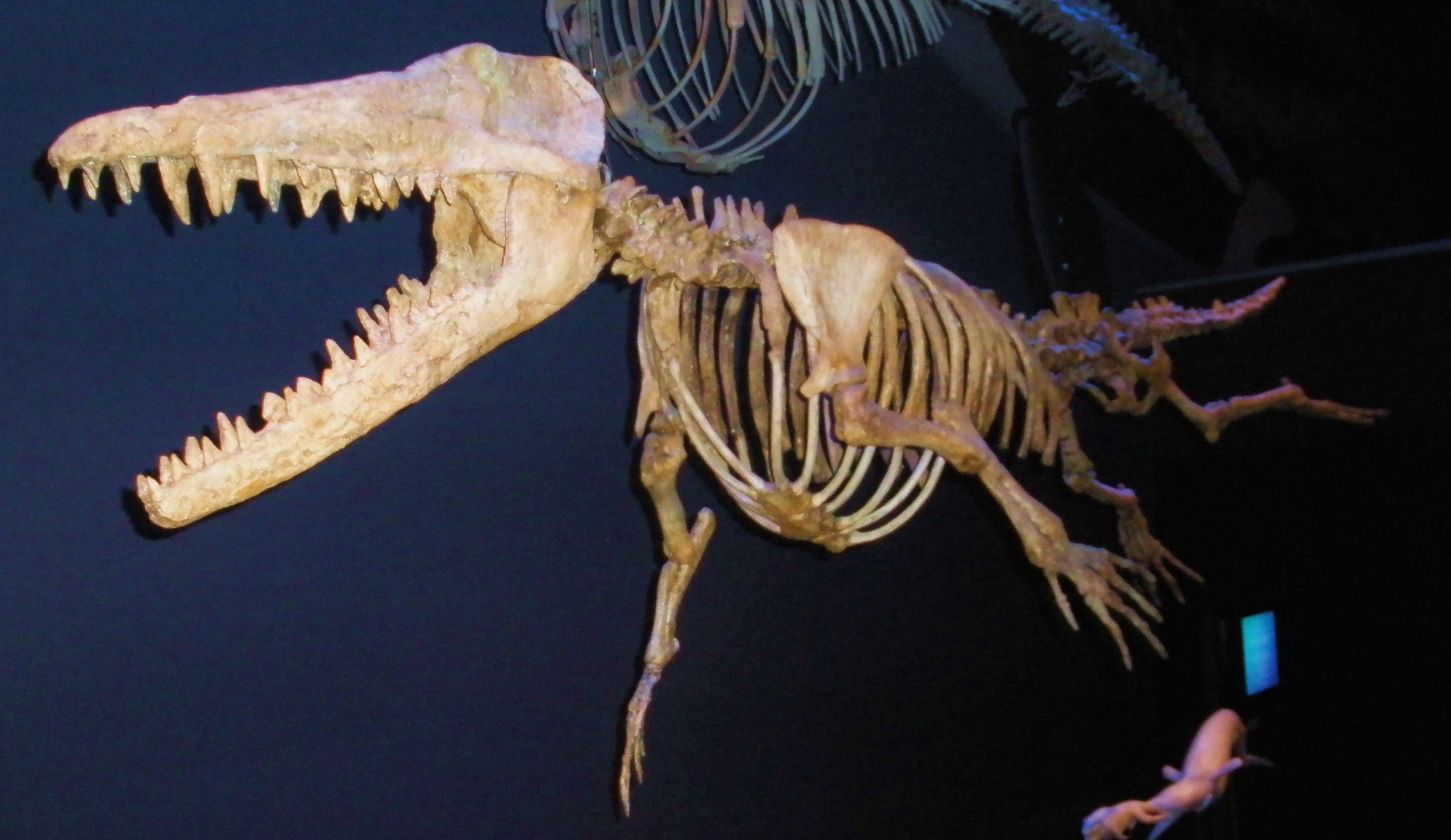
Skeleton of Ambulocetus natans, a stem whale

The traditional theory of cetacean evolution was that cetaceans were related to the mesonychian. These animals had unusual triangular teeth very similar to those of primitive cetaceans. This is why scientists long believed that cetaceans evolved from a form of mesonychian. Today, many scientists believe cetaceans evolved from the same stock that gave rise to hippopotamuses. This hypothesized ancestral group likely split into two branches around 54 million years ago. One branch would evolve into cetaceans, possibly beginning about 52 million years ago with the proto-whale Pakicetus and other early cetacean ancestors collectively known as Archaeoceti, which eventually underwent aquatic adaptation into the completely aquatic cetaceans. The other branch became the anthracotheres, a large family of four-legged beasts, the earliest of whom in the late Eocene would have resembled skinny hippopotamuses with comparatively small and narrow heads. All branches of the anthracotheres, except that which evolved into Hippopotamidae, became extinct during the Pliocene without leaving any descendants.

The family Raoellidae is said to be the closest artiodactyl family to the cetaceans. Consequentially, new theories in cetacean evolution hypothesize that whales and their ancestors escaped predation, not competition, by slowly adapting to the ocean.

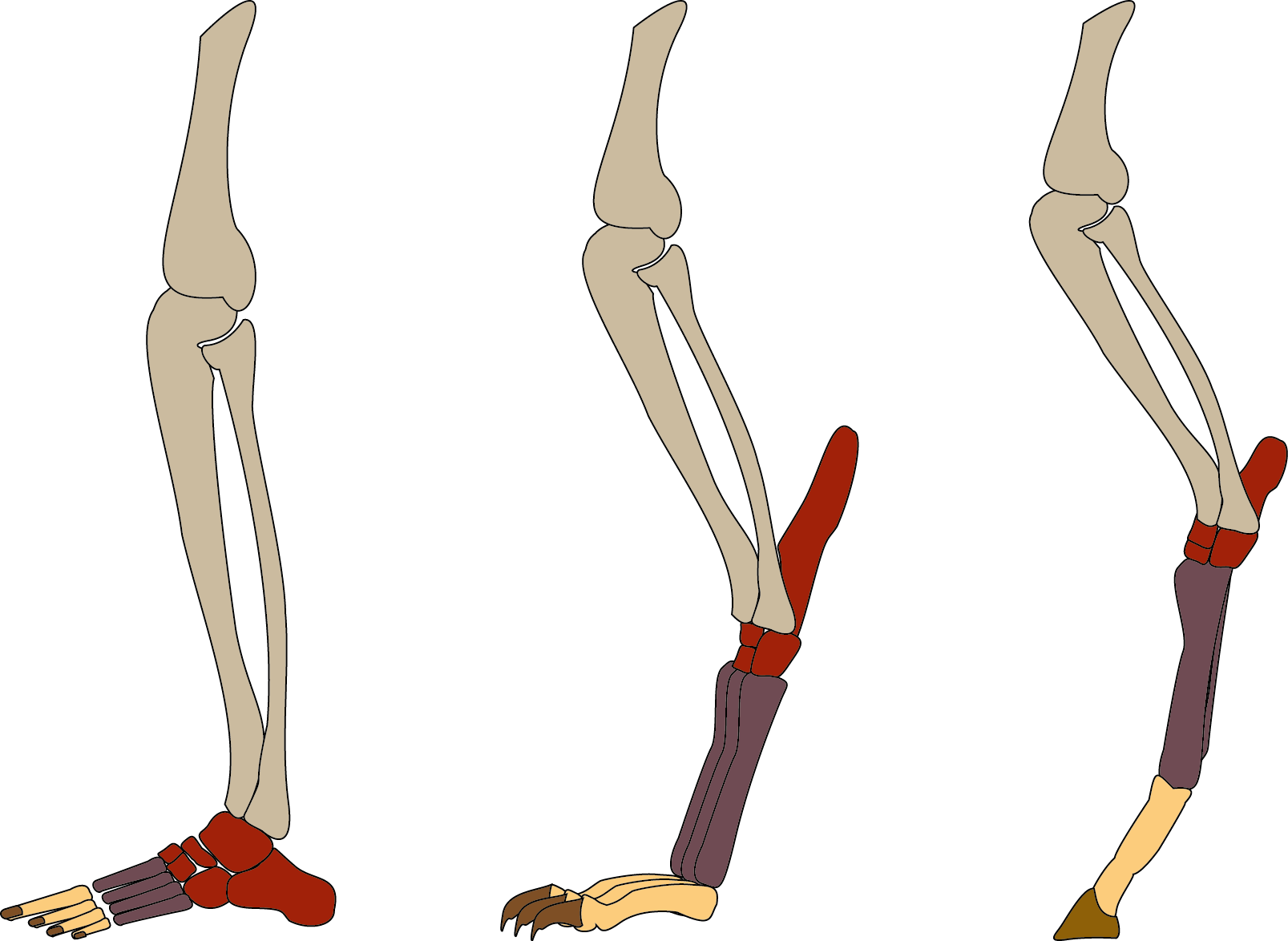
Comparison of lower limb structure. From left to right: plantigrade, digitigrade and unguligrade. In red the basipod, in violet the metapodia, in yellow the phalanges, in brown the keratin nails.

== Characteristics ==
Skeleton of a horse

Ungulates are in high diversity in response to sexual selection and ecological events; most ungulates lack a collar bone. Terrestrial ungulates are for the most part herbivores, with some of them being grazers. However, there are exceptions to this, as pigs, peccaries, hippos, and duikers are known to have an omnivorous diet. Cetaceans are the only modern ungulates that have a carnivorous diet; baleen whales consume significantly smaller animals in relation to their body size, such as small species of fish and krill; toothed whales, depending on the species, can consume a wide range of species: squid, fish, sharks, and other species of mammals such as seals and other whales. In terms of ecosystem, ungulates have colonized all corners of the planet, from mountains to the ocean depths; grasslands to deserts and some have been domesticated by humans.

=== Anatomy ===
Ungulates have developed specialized adaptations, especially in the areas of cranial appendages, dentition, and leg morphology, including the modification of the astragalus (one of the ankle bones at the end of the lower leg) with a short, robust head.

==== Hooves ====
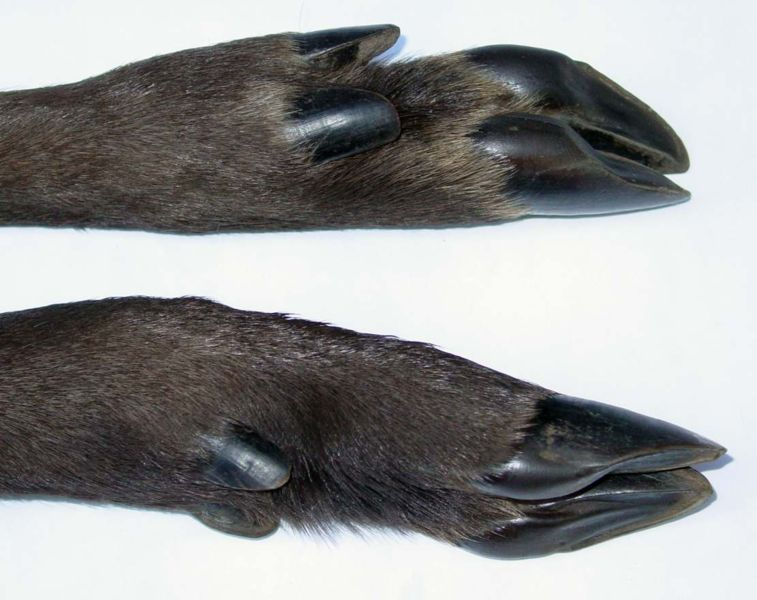
Cloven hooves of roe deer (Capreolus capreolus), with dewclaws

The hoof is the tip of the toe of an ungulate mammal, strengthened by a thick horny (keratin) covering. The hoof consists of a hard or rubbery sole, and a hard wall formed by a thick nail rolled around the tip of the toe. Both the sole and the edge of the hoof wall normally bear the weight of the animal. Hooves grow continuously, and are constantly worn down by use. In most modern ungulates, the radius and ulna are fused along the length of the forelimb; early ungulates, such as the arctocyonids, did not share this unique skeletal structure. The fusion of the radius and ulna prevents an ungulate from rotating its forelimb. Since this skeletal structure has no specific function in ungulates, it is considered a homologous characteristic that ungulates share with other mammals. This trait would have been passed down from a common ancestor. While the colloquial names for the two orders of ungulates were based on the number of toes of their members ("odd-toed" for the perissodactyls and "even-toed" for the terrestrial artiodactyls), it is not an accurate reason for grouping them. Tapirs have four toes in the front, yet they were members of the "odd-toed" order; peccaries and modern cetaceans were members of the "even-toed" order, yet peccaries have three toes in the front and whales were an extreme example as they have flippers instead of hooves. Scientists had classified them according to the distribution of their weight to their toes.

Perissodactyls have a mesaxonic foot, meaning that the weight is distributed on the third toe on all legs thanks to the plane symmetry of their feet. There has been a reduction of toes from the common ancestor, with the classic example being horses with their single hooves. This gave rise to an alternative name for the perissodactyls: the nearly obsolete label Mesaxonia. Perissodactyls were not the only lineage of mammals to have evolved this trait; the meridiungulates have evolved mesaxonic feet numerous times.

Terrestrial artiodactyls have a paraxonic foot, meaning that the weight is distributed on the third and the fourth toe on all legs. The majority of these mammals have cloven hooves, with two smaller ones known as the dewclaws that are located further up on the foot. The earliest cetaceans (the archaeocetes) also had this characteristic in the addition of also having both an astragalus and cuboid bone in the ankle, which were further diagnostic traits of artiodactyls.

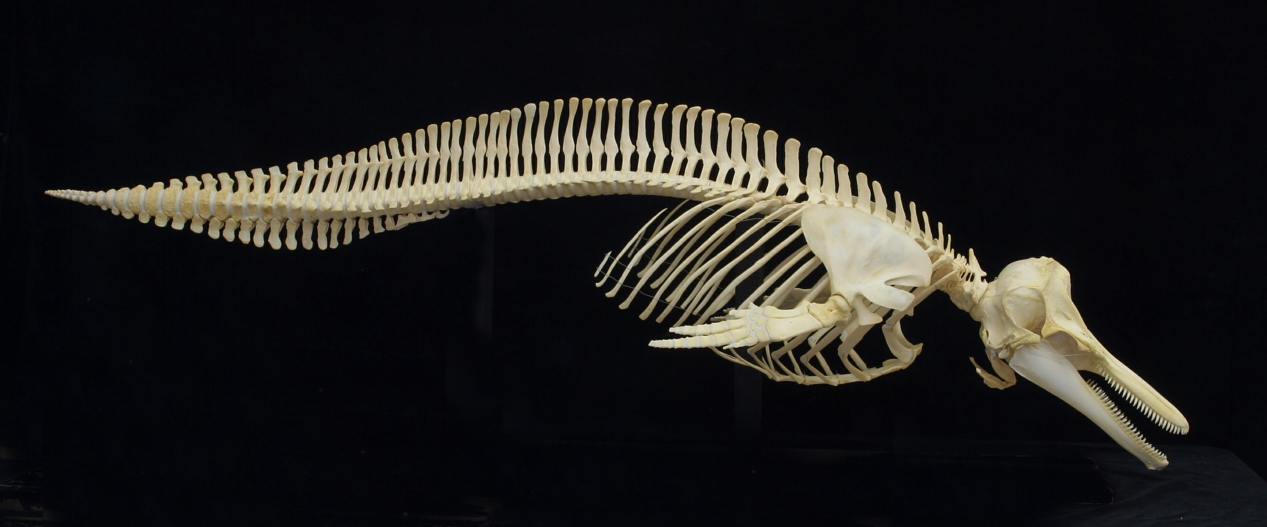
Pacific white-sided dolphin skeleton (missing pelvic bones), on exhibit at The Museum of Osteology, Oklahoma City, Oklahoma

In modern cetaceans, the front limbs had become pectoral fins and the hind parts were internal and reduced. Occasionally, the genes that code for longer extremities cause a modern cetacean to develop miniature legs (known as atavism). The main method of moving is an up-and-down motion with the tail fin, called the fluke, which is used for propulsion, while the pectoral fins together with the entire tail section provide directional control. All modern cetaceans still retain their digits despite the external appearance suggesting otherwise.

==== Teeth ====
Most ungulates have developed reduced canine teeth and specialized molars, including bunodont (low, rounded cusps) and hypsodont (high crowned) teeth. The development of hypsodonty has been of particular interest as this adaptation was strongly associated with the spread of grasslands during the Miocene about 25 million years ago. As forest biomes declined, grasslands spread, opening new niches for mammals. Many ungulates switched from browsing diets to grazing diets, and possibly driven by abrasive silica in grass, hypsodonty became common. However, recent evidence ties the evolution of hypsodonty to open, gritty habitats and not the grass itself. This is termed the "Grit, not grass hypothesis".

Some ungulates completely lack upper incisors and instead have a dental pad to assist in browsing. It can be found in camels, ruminants, and some toothed whales; modern baleen whales were remarkable in that they have baleen instead to filter out the krill from the water. On the other end of the spectrum, teeth have evolved as weapons or sexual display as seen in pigs and peccaries, some species of deer, musk deer, hippopotamuses, beaked whales, and the narwhal, with its long canine tooth.

==== Cranial appendages ====
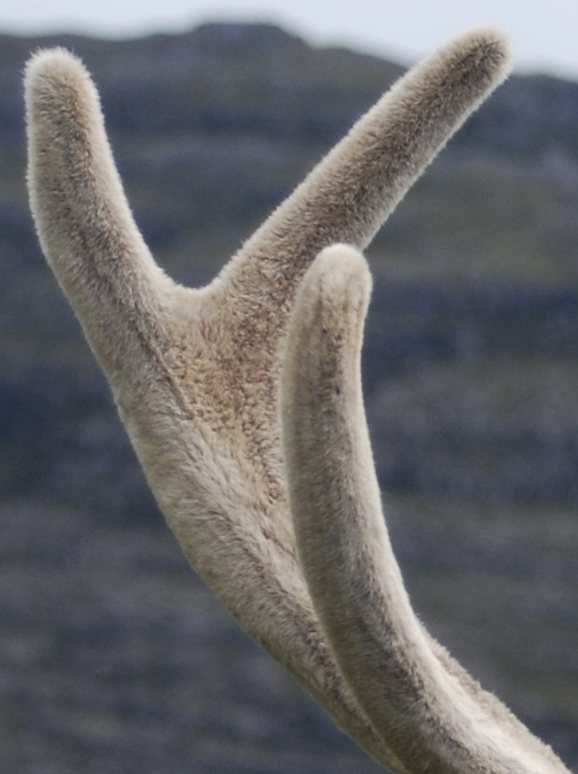
Velvet covers a growing antler and provides it with blood, supplying oxygen and nutrients.

Ungulates have evolved a variety of cranial appendages that can be found in cervoids (with the exception of musk deer). In oxen and antelope, the size and shape of the horns varies greatly, but the basic structure is always a pair of simple bony protrusions without branches, often having a spiral, twisted, or fluted form, each covered in a permanent sheath of keratin. The unique horn structure is the only unambiguous morphological feature of bovids that distinguishes them from other pecorans. Male horn development has been linked to sexual selection, while the presence of horns in females is likely due to natural selection. The horns of females are usually smaller than those of males and are sometimes of a different shape. The horns of female bovids are thought to have evolved for defense against predators or to express territoriality, as non-territorial females, which are able to use crypsis for predator defense, often lack horns.

Rhinoceros horns, unlike those of other horned mammals, consist only of keratin. These horns rest on the nasal ridge of the animal's skull.

Antlers are unique to cervids and found mostly on males: the only cervid females with antlers are caribou and reindeer, whose antlers are normally smaller than males'. Nevertheless, fertile does of other species of deer have the capacity to produce antlers on occasion, usually due to increased testosterone levels. Each antler grows from an attachment point on the skull called a pedicle. While an antler is growing it is covered with highly vascular skin called velvet, which supplies oxygen and nutrients to the growing bone. Antlers are considered one of the most exaggerated cases of male secondary sexual traits in the animal kingdom, and grow faster than any other mammal bone. Growth occurs at the tip, initially as cartilage that is then mineralized to become bone. Once the antler has achieved its full size, the velvet is lost and the antler's bone dies. This dead bone structure is the mature antler. In most cases, the bone at the base is destroyed by osteoclasts and the antlers eventually fall off. As a result of their fast growth rate, antlers place a substantial nutritional demand on deer, and they can thus constitute an honest signal of metabolic efficiency and food gathering capability.

Ossicones are horn-like (or antler-like) protuberances found on the heads of giraffes and male okapis. They are similar to the horns of antelopes and cattle, save that they are derived from ossified cartilage, and that the ossicones remain covered in skin and fur rather than horn.

Pronghorn cranial appendages are unique. Each "horn" of the pronghorn is composed of a slender, laterally flattened blade of bone that grows from the frontal bones of the skull, forming a permanent core. As in the Giraffidae, skin covers the bony cores, but in the pronghorn it develops into a keratinous sheath that is shed and regrown on an annual basis. Unlike the horns of the family Bovidae, the horn sheaths of the pronghorn are branched, each sheath possessing a forward-pointing tine (hence the name pronghorn). The horns of males are well developed.

== See also ==
- Altungulata
