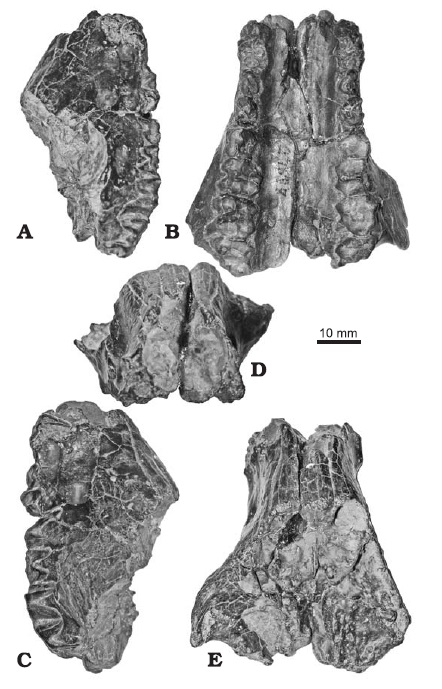
- Rostrum material of Diamantohyus africanus.

Scientific classification
- Domain: Eukaryota
- Kingdom: Animalia
- Phylum: Chordata
- Class: Mammalia
- Order: Artiodactyla
- Suborder: Suina
- Family: †Sanitheriidae; Simpson, 1945

Genera
- †Diamantohyus; †Sanitherium

= Sanitheriidae =

Sanitheriidae Temporal range: Early Miocene–Middle Miocene

Extinct family of mammals

Sanitheriidae is an extinct family of suoid artiodactyl ungulates that were once widely distributed in Africa, Europe, and South Asia, existing from the Early Miocene to the Middle Miocene. Unlike pigs and peccaries, the dentition and limb morphology suggests the sanitheres were more carnivorous and cursorial. The dentition in particular is similar to early ruminants. Only two genera are recognized: Sanitherium and Diamantohyus.
