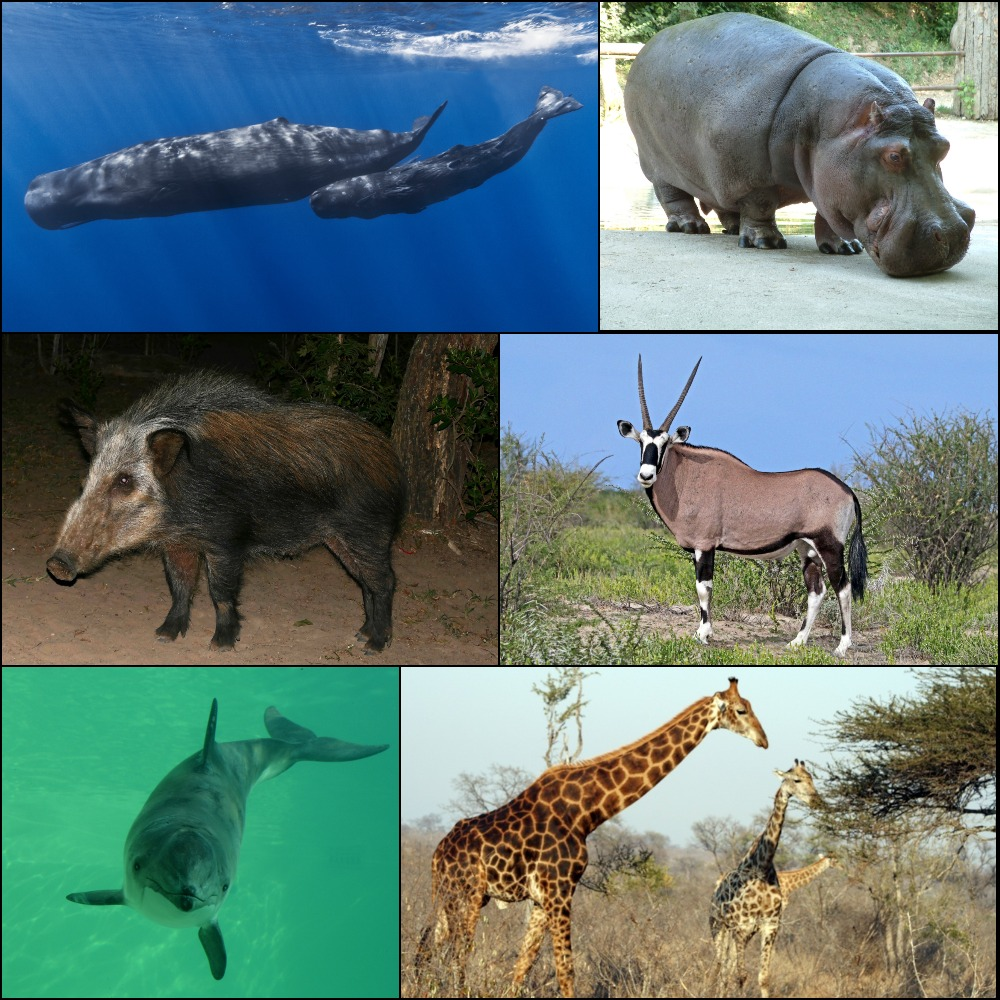
- Some examples of Artiofabula

Scientific classification
- Kingdom: Animalia
- Phylum: Chordata
- Class: Mammalia
- Order: Artiodactyla
- Clade: Artiofabula; Waddell et al. 1999

Subgroups
- Suina; Cetruminantia

Synonyms
- Cetartiofabula

= Artiofabula =

Artiofabula Temporal range: Early Eocene to present

Clade of mammals comprising pigs, cows, hippos, and whales, among others

Artiofabula is a clade made up of the Suina and the Cetruminantia. The clade was found in molecular phylogenetic analyses and contradicted traditional relationships based on morphological analyses.

== Etymology ==
The name Artiofabula was derived from Greek "artios" (meaning complete or perfect of its kind or, with respect to numbers, even), and Latin "fabula" (meaning fable). The latter referred to the clade breaking up traditional views on artiodactyl taxonomy based on morphological analyses, where camels grouped with ruminants, hippos with pigs, and whales were unrelated.

== Phylogeny ==
Phylogenetic analyses of artiodactyls revealed the following relationships:

- Artiodactyla
  - Tylopoda (camels)
  - Artiofabula
    - Suina (pigs)
    - Cetruminantia
      - Ruminantia (ruminants)
      - Whippomorpha (Cetancodonta)
        - Hippopotamidae (hippopotamuses)
        - Cetacea (whales)

== Classification ==
- Order Artiodactyla (even-toed ungulates)
  - Suborder Tylopoda (camelids)
  - Artiofabula (ruminants, pigs, peccaries, whales, and dolphins)
    - Suborder Suina (pigs and peccaries)
      - Family Suidae 19 species (pigs)
      - Family Tayassuidae 4 species (peccaries)
    - Cetruminantia (ruminants, whales, and dolphins)
      - Suborder Ruminantia (antelope, buffalo, cattle, goats, sheep, deer, giraffes, and chevrotains)
        - Family Antilocapridae, 1 species (pronghorn)
        - Family Bovidae, 135 species (antelope, bison, buffalo, cattle, goats, and sheep)
        - Family Cervidae, 55 - 94 species (deer, elk, and moose)
        - Family Giraffidae, 2 species (giraffes, okapis)
        - Family Moschidae, 4 - 7 species (musk deer)
        - Family Tragulidae, 6 - 10 species (chevrotains, or mouse deer)
      - Suborder Whippomorpha (aquatic or semi-aquatic even-toed ungulates)
        - Infraorder Ancodonta
          - Family Hippopotamidae, 2 species (hippopotamuses)
        - Infraorder Cetacea (whales, dolphins, and porpoises)
          - Parvorder Mysticeti (baleen whales)
            - Family Balaenidae, 2 - 4 species (right whales and bowhead whales)
            - Family Balaenopteridae, 6 - 9 species (rorquals)
            - Family Eschrichtiidae, 1 species (gray whale)
            - Family Neobalaenidae, 1 species (pygmy right whale)
          - Parvorder Odontoceti (toothed whales, dolphins, and porpoises)
            - Superfamily Delphinoidea (dolphins, arctic whales, porpoises, and relatives)
              - Family Delphinidae, 38 species (dolphins, killer whales, and relatives)
              - Family Monodontidae, 2 species (beluga and narwhal)
              - Family Phocoenidae, 6 species (porpoises)
            - Superfamily Physeteroidea (sperm whales)
              - Family Kogiidae, 2 species (pygmy and dwarf sperm whales)
              - Family Physeteridae, 1 species (common sperm whale)
            - Superfamily Ziphoidea (beaked whales)
              - Family Ziphidae, 22 species (modern beaked whales)
            - Superfamily Platanistoidea (river dolphins)
              - Family Platanistidae, 1 - 2 species (Asian river dolphin(s))
            - Superfamily Inioidea
              - Family Iniidae, 1 - 3 species (South American river dolphin(s))
              - Family Pontoporiidae, 1 species (La Plata dolphin)
            - Superfamily Lipotoidea
              - Family Lipotidae, 1 species (baiji or Chinese river dolphin)
