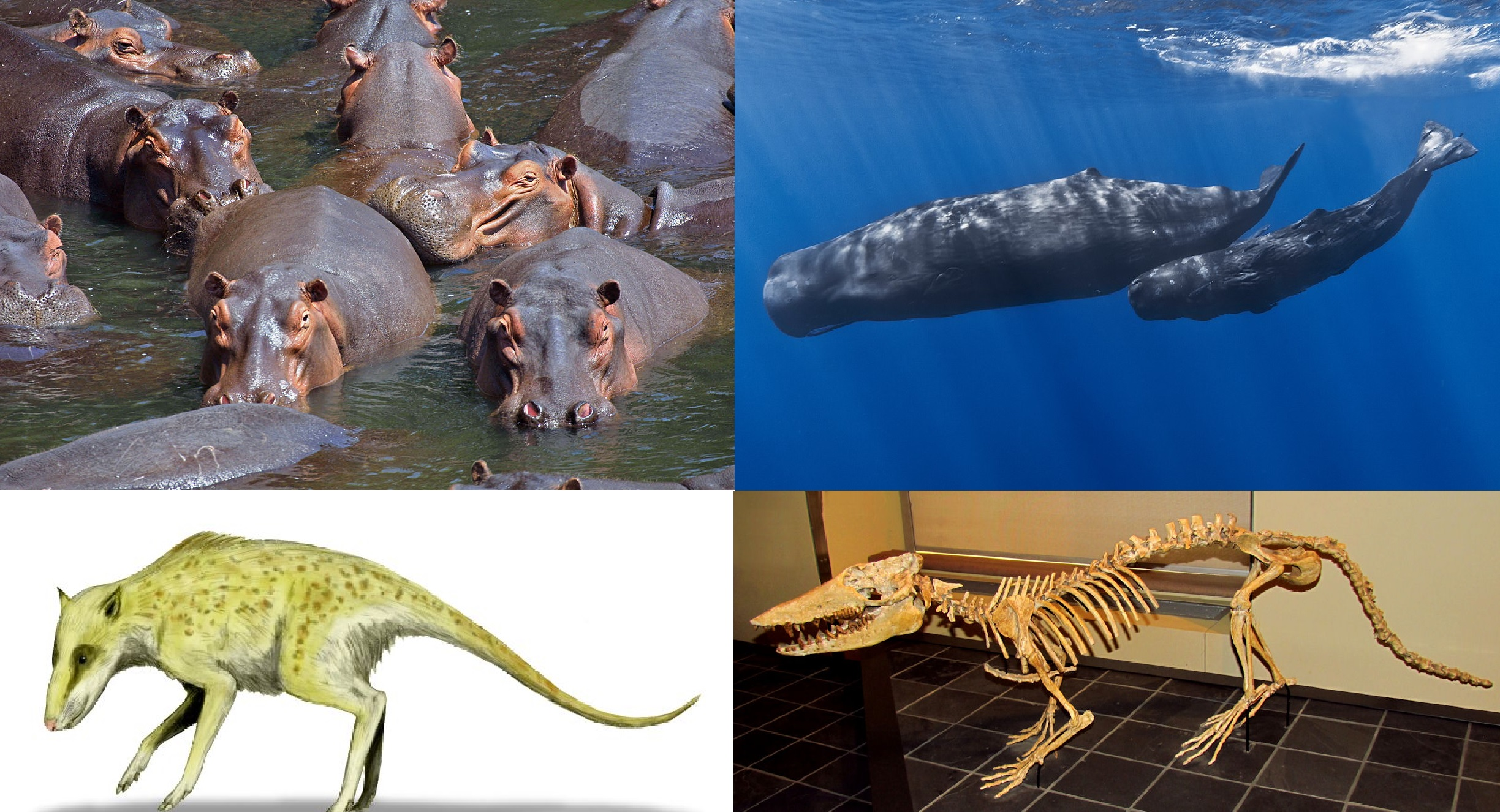

Scientific classification
- Kingdom: Animalia
- Phylum: Chordata
- Class: Mammalia
- Order: Artiodactyla
- Clade: Cetancodontamorpha
- Suborder: Whippomorpha; Waddell et al. 1999

Subgroups
- Ancodonta; Cetaceamorpha

= Whippomorpha =

Whippomorphs Temporal range: Early Eocene–present

Suborder of mammals

Whippomorpha is a clade of Artiodactyla that contains all living cetaceans (whales) and Hippopotamidae. This makes it a crown group. Whippomorpha is a suborder within the order Artiodactyla (even-toed ungulates). The placement of Whippomorpha within Artiodactyla is a matter of some contention, as hippopotamuses were previously considered to be more closely related to Suidae (pigs) and Tayassuidae (peccaries). Most contemporary scientific phylogenetic and morphological research studies link hippopotamuses with whales, and genetic evidence has overwhelmingly supported an evolutionary relationship between Hippopotamidae and Cetacea. Modern whippomorphs all share a number of behavioural and physiological traits, such as a dense layer of subcutaneous fat and largely hairless bodies. They exhibit amphibious and aquatic behaviors and possess similar auditory structures.

Whippomorpha is a subgroup of Cetancodontamorpha. Cetanconodontomorpha also includes the more basal extinct helohyids, entelodonts and Andrewsarchus.

== Etymology ==
The name Whippomorpha comes from whippo, a colloquial term coined in reference to the notion that whales and hippos are each other's closest relatives, and the suffix -morpha (from Greek morphē (μορφή, "form")). Attempts have been made to rename the clade Cetancodonta, due to the misleading use of "-morpha" for a crown group as well as the risk of confusion with the clade Hippomorpha (which consists of equid perissodactyls). However, Whippomorpha maintains precedence.

== Ecology ==
=== Distribution ===
Modern whippomorphs are widely distributed. Cetaceans are found in almost all marine habitats; some species, like the blue whale and humpback whale, have migratory ranges that comprise nearly the entire ocean. These whales typically migrate seasonally, moving to warmer waters to give birth and raise young before travelling to cooler waters with better feeding grounds. Other cetacean species have smaller ranges that are concentrated around either tropical or subtropical waters. Some cetaceans live exclusively within a single marine body, such as the narwhal, whose range is limited to the Arctic Ocean.

By contrast, aside their introduced range, particularly in South America, modern hippopotamuses are confined entirely to Africa. Despite once being widespread across Europe, Africa and Asia, hippos are now considered vulnerable and are limited to the lakes, rivers and wetlands of southern Africa.

=== Behaviour ===
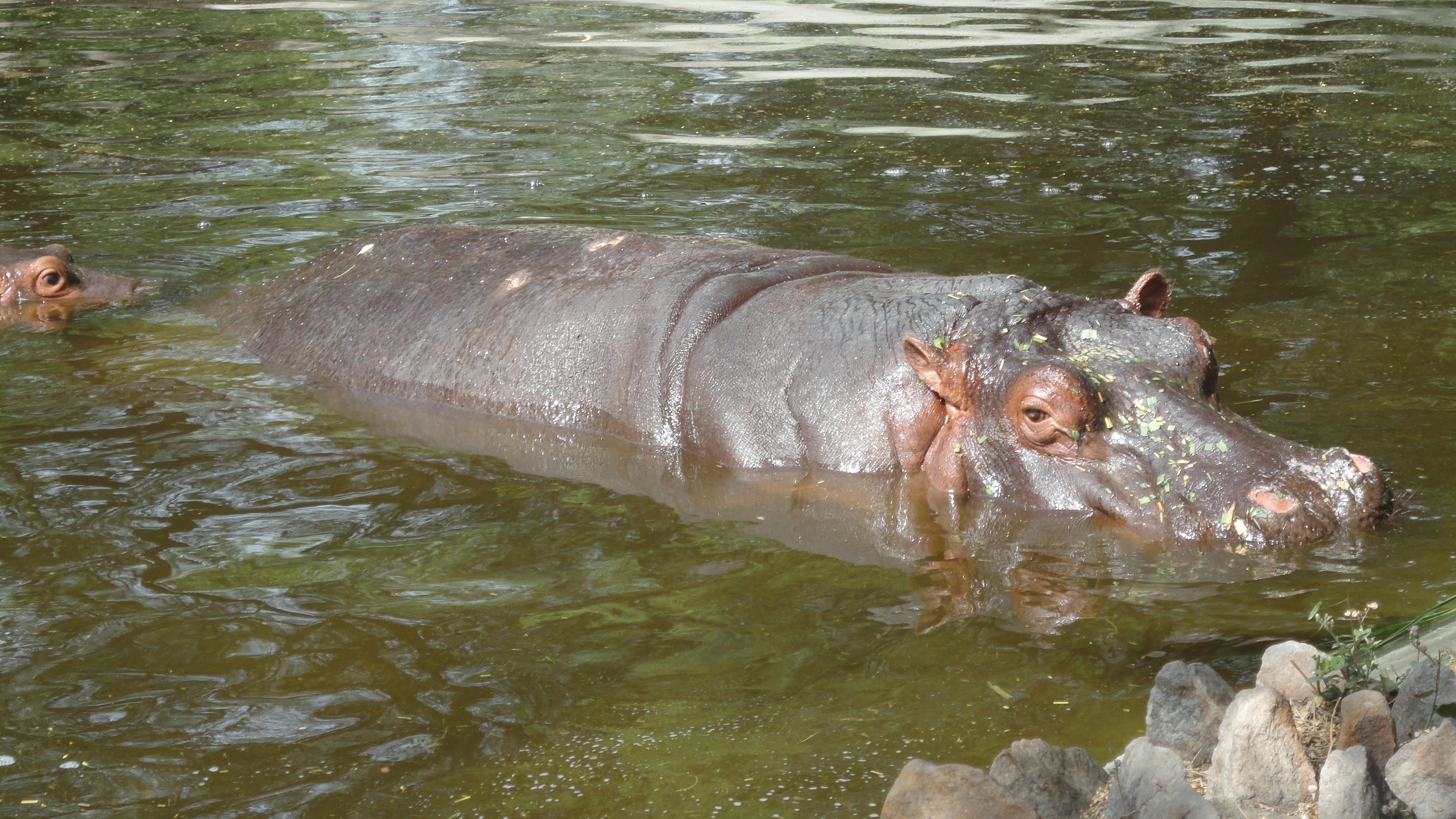
A hippopotamus surfacing to breathe

Both whales and hippos must surface to breathe. This can pose problems for sleeping whippomorphs. Cetaceans overcome this problem by unihemispheric sleep, meaning they rest one side of their brain at a time, allowing them to swim and surface during rest periods. Hippopotamuses surface to breathe every three to five minutes, a process that is partially subconscious, allowing them to do it while sleeping. Both whales and hippos exhibit symbiotic relationships with smaller fish, which they use as cleaning stations, allowing the smaller organisms to feed on parasites that enter the creature's mouth.

Hippos are herbivores; normally their diet consists entirely of short grasses that they graze on. Some hippos have been observed consuming animals such as zebra and even other hippo carcasses. A hippo normally spends up to five hours a day grazing. They normally feed only on land, though occasional consumption of aquatic vegetation has been observed. By contrast, all cetaceans are carnivores, feeding on fish and marine invertebrates; some species feed on mammals and birds (such as seals and penguins).

=== Reproduction ===
All whippomorphs are placental mammals, meaning that embryos are fed by the placenta, which draws nutrients from the mother's body. They are k-select organisms, producing a small number of offspring, but with a high rate of survival.

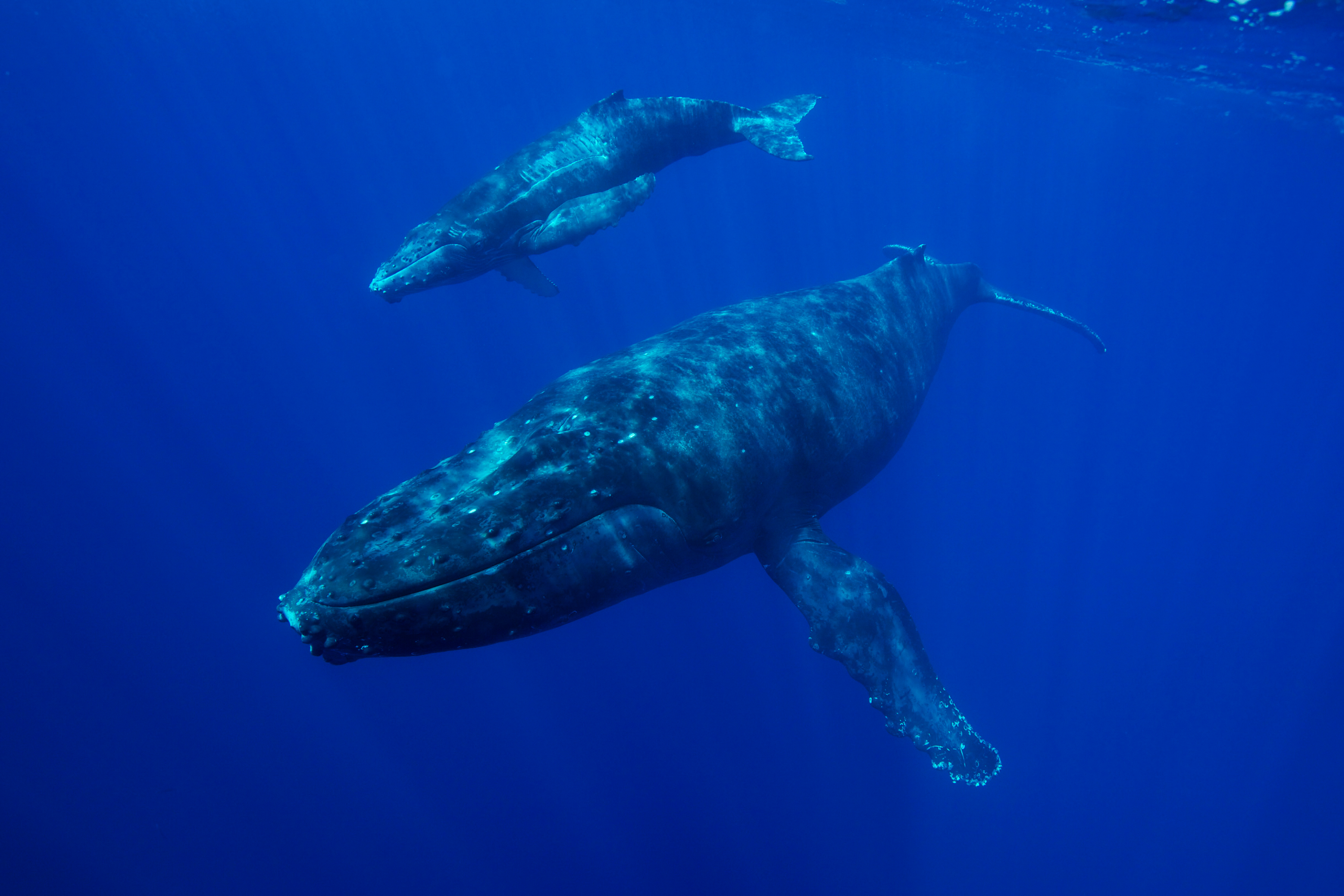
A humpback whale (Megaptera novaeangliae) with her calf

Hippos reach sexual maturity when they are six years old and have a gestation of about eight months. Mating typically occurs in the water. Mother hippos isolate themselves for two weeks before giving birth. The birthing process also takes place underwater, meaning calves must swim to the surface in order to breathe for the first time. Hippopotamus calves suckle on land.

Cetaceans generally reach sexual maturity around 10 years of age, and have a gestation period of ~12 months. Cetaceans give birth to well-developed calves, like hippopotamuses. When suckling, the mother splashes milk into the calf's mouth, as they have no lips.

== Taxonomy and phylogeny ==
Whippomorpha is a clade within the order Artiodactyla, and the clade Cetancodontamorpha. It contains the clades Hippopotamoidea (ancestors of hippopotamuses) and Cetaceamorpha (ancestors of whales). Whippomorpha is considered a sister clade to Ruminantia (which contains cattle, sheep and deer). Hippopotamoidea was formerly included in Suiformes with Suidae (pigs) and Tayassuidae (peccaries).

Most of the evidence supporting the Whippomorpha clade is based on molecular or genetic analysis. Early support for the existence of a Cetacea/Hippopotamidae clade came from analysis of the molecular composition of a blood-clotting protein γ-fibrinogen taken from whales and hippos. Later studies obtained findings that indicated almost 11,000 orthologous genes between cetaceans and hippos, in addition to many positive indicators of a shared evolutionary history between whales and hippopotamuses. Also, some genetic sequences have been found in both whales and hippopotamuses that are not present in the genomes of other mammals. This would indicate that these groups share ancestry.

Whippomorpha's placement within Artiodactyla can be represented in the following cladogram:

- Artiodactyla
  - Tylopoda (camels)
  - Artiofabula
    - Suina (pigs)
    - Cetruminantia
      - Ruminantia (ruminants)
      - Cetancodonta/Whippomorpha
        - Hippopotamidae (hippopotamuses)
        - Cetacea (whales)

== Evolution ==
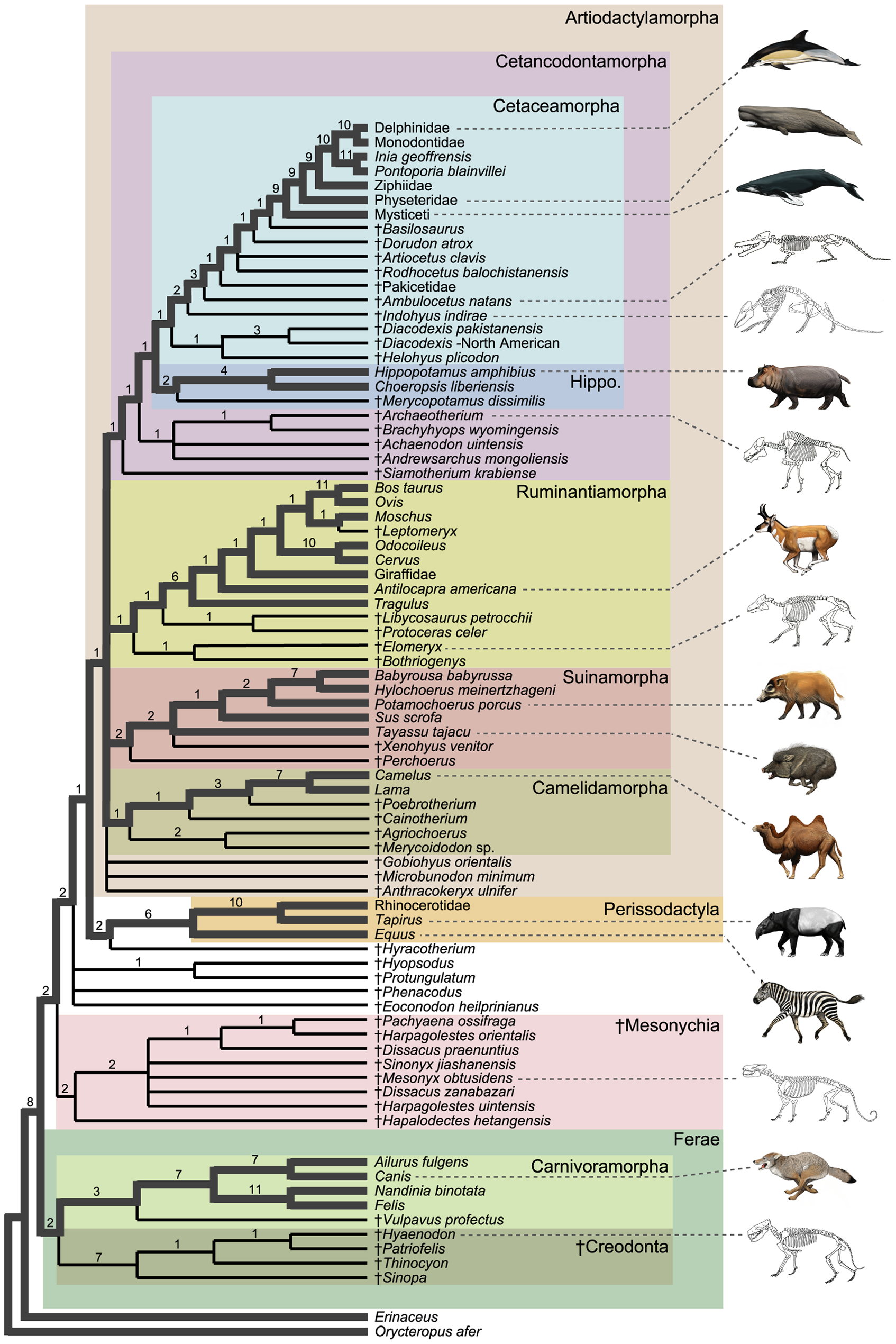
Cladogram showing Whippomorpha within Artiodactylamorpha: Whippomorpha consists of the clades labeled Hippopotamoidea and Cetaceamorpha.

It is unknown whether the last common ancestor of whales and hippos led an aquatic, semiaquatic/amphibious, or terrestrial lifestyle. Therefore, it is a matter of contention whether the aquatic traits of both hippos and whales are linked or from convergent evolution. Recent findings seem to indicate that the latter is more likely.

Whippomorpha diverged from other artiodactyls ~59 Mya; whales diverged from hippos ~55 Mya. The first branch contained ancestors of Cetacea; semi-aquatic protowhales such as Pakicetus in the group Archaeoceti, which developed into the exclusively aquatic ancestors of modern cetaceans.

One evolutionarily significant whale ancestor was the raoellid Indohyus, which was a Himalayas-dwelling, digitgrade omnivore roughly the size of a raccoon. It was not an adept swimmer, though it was thought to have spent considerable amounts of time wading in shallow water. This would have been helped by its heavy bones, giving stability. Indohyus likely had a diet at least partly based on aquatic foraging. Evidence for this includes the fact that the tooth enamel of Indohyus was considerably less worn than would be expected for an animal with an exclusively terrestrial diet. One of the most crucial facets of the discovery of Indohyus was the presence of a thickened auditory bulla, also known as an involucrum. This discovery was significant as the involucrum was a morphology thought previously to be exclusive to cetaceans, a synapomorphy. This feature irrefutably linked whales to raoellids.

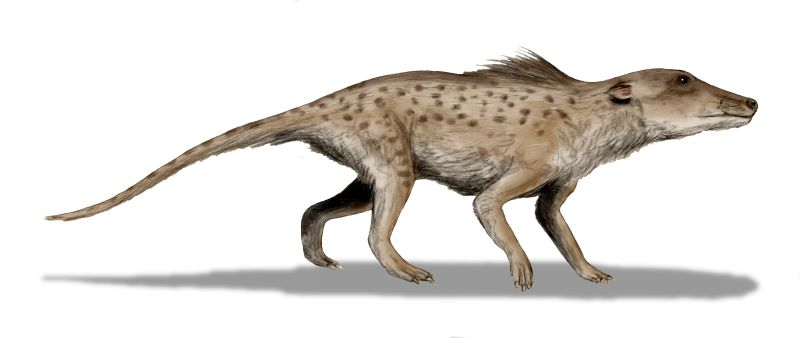
An interpretation of Pakicetus

It is thought that early whales such as Nalacetus and Pakicetus were restricted to freshwater, as modern hippos are. The later Ambulocetus likely had a much more aquatic lifestyle, with shorter legs and paddle-like hands and feet. It also likely represented a transitional organism from freshwater to seawater, as isotopic analysis of the bones and teeth of Ambulocetus indicate that it inhabited estuaries.

The second branch of Whippomorpha is thought to have developed into the family Anthracotheriidae, who were the putative ancestors of modern hippopotamuses. The sediments in which Anthracotheriid fossils have been fossilized indicate that they were at least partly amphibious, while the jaw structure of fossils of select species, particularly Anthracotherium, seem to indicate that it was an ancestral form of hippo.

These findings somewhat explain the once confusing paleontological age gap that existed as a major piece of evidence against an evolutionary link between hippos and whales. Previously, the oldest known cetacean fossils were ~50 Myr, while the earliest known hippo fossils were ~15 Myr. The sum of the fossil knowledge indicates that whales and hippopotamuses developed amphibious/aquatic traits independently, but that the features developed by their shared ancestors created pathways to the development of said adaptations. Thus the large difference in time between the discovery of whale and hippopotamid fossils is explained by the fact that hippos simply developed their semi-aquatic adaptations much later than whales did.

== Anatomy ==
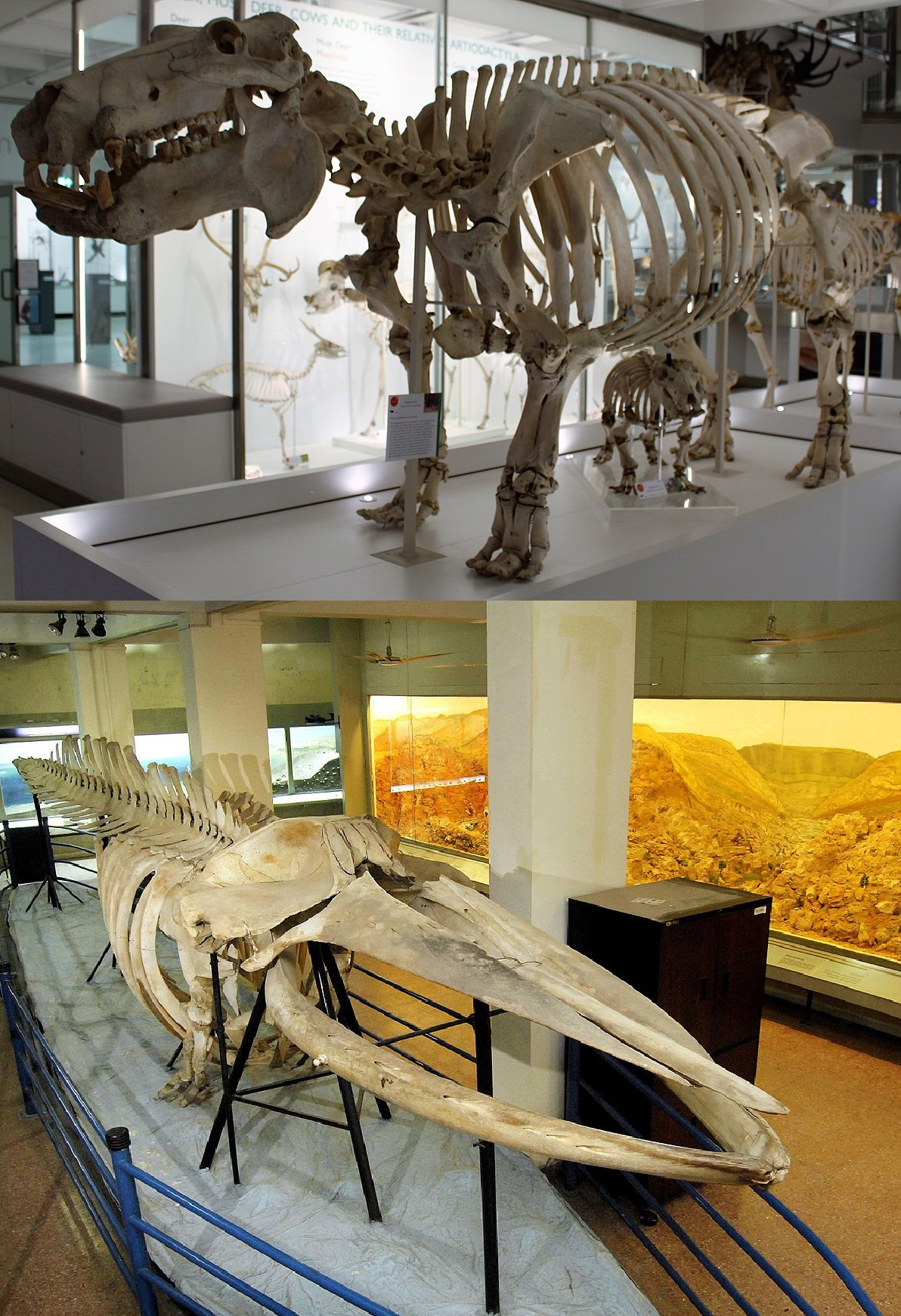
Top: Skeleton of an adult and calf hippopotamus (Hippopotamus amphibius), Bottom: A blue whale calf (Balaenoptera musculus)

All Whippomorphans share some anatomic similarities. Hippopotamus stomachs are multi-chambered as with all ruminants; however, they do not regurgitate food. Instead, said stomach has two preliminary chambers, which acts similar to a compost bin, allowing food to ferment before entering the main stomach. All whales have similar stomach structures. Also, both animals bear single-lobed lungs (similar to other aquatic mammals), which can be filled with air more rapidly. This is a critical adaptation for both amphibious and aquatic organisms, as it reduces the frequency of dangerous trips to the water surface, where such organisms are more vulnerable to predation.

Hippos' bodies contain a layer of dense fat, reminiscent of a whales' blubber, and situated between skin and muscle. Hippos and whales both have thick bones, which aid in rapid descent into water, have minimal hair (to aid in hydrodynamics) and a lack of sweat glands. Webbing is also found between the toes of hippopotamuses; a more land-suitable version of a whale's flippers. Hippos have unique hind-limb musculature that gives them powerful propulsion capabilities, rather than fine-tuned control. These features are characteristic of other ungulates.

There is strong resemblance between the dentition of primitive cetaceans and primitive ungulates, which seemingly cements the position of Cetacea within Artiodactyla. Also, both cetaceans and artiodactyls have two distinct components in their ear, the involucrum and sigmoid process. Similar features are considered responsible for the ability of cetaceans to hear underwater. The skeletons of prehistoric whales also contain uniquely shaped ankle bones, including a double-pulley system found only in even-toed ungulates and crucially not present in odd-toed ungulates.

Both hippos and whales have a large and uniquely shaped larynx, which enables the booming calls of whales underwater and the noises produced by hippos to communicate while submerged.

== Relationship with humans ==
Whippomorphs have always had complex cultural and social relationships with humans. Hippopotamuses have a reputation for extreme aggression towards humans. Hippos are incredibly territorial and protective of their young, and are the deadliest mammal in Africa, killing between two and three thousand people a year. Despite this, hippos remain popular zoo animals and a recognizable species in popular culture. Hippos were hunted by ancient humans for food and sport. In Ancient Egypt, hippos were recognized as dangerous inhabitants of the Nile, and a red hippo was the symbol of the god Set. The biblical Behemoth is thought to be based on or inspired by the hippo.

Hippos face a number of threats from humans. Common hippopotamuses are classified as vulnerable, and are subject to habitat destruction due to agriculture, water management, climate change and development of housing and urban areas. Pygmy hippopotamuses are considered endangered, with less than 3,000 of them in the wild. The surviving pygmy hippos occupy a much smaller habitat area in Liberia, Sierra Leone, and the Ivory Coast. They face threats from mining and quarrying, hunting, poaching, and logging.

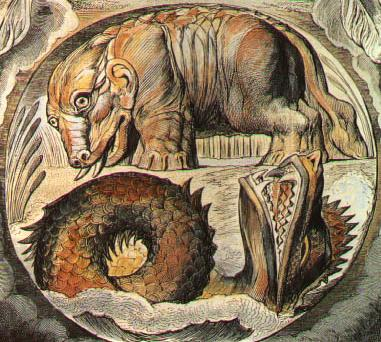
Two monsters of biblical legend: Behemoth (top); thought to be inspired by the hippopotamus, and Leviathan (bottom); thought to be inspired by whales

Cetaceans also have an extensive history with humans. The main threats to cetaceans are direct danger (whaling), and indirect damage to habitat (through pollution and overfishing). Commercial shipping, oil drilling and coastal development can disrupt cetacean habitats. Thousands of cetaceans are affected by bycatching every year. Some evidence also exists that human-generated sound may account for increases in the rate of whale stranding.

Whales were inspirations for many mythical creatures, including the Leviathan, which was associated with the Behemoth. Dolphins are mentioned in historical literature far more often than whales. Stories of dolphins typically include them playing a role in helping shipwrecked sailors or guiding lost ships. In the 20th century, perceptions of whales changed, and now tourism for the purposes of whale watching has become very popular. Cetaceans are revered for their immense size, intelligent and playful dispositions, displays of speed in water, and contributions to scientific research.

Whales have been kept in captivity by humans for research and entertainment for centuries. Particularly popular are killer whales. Conservation and animal rights organizations have been vehemently opposed to the captivity of these cetaceans. It is common for captive killer whales to display aggression toward other whales and their trainers. Bottlenose dolphins are also popular, due to their friendly behavior. They also fare better in captivity than other cetaceans.
