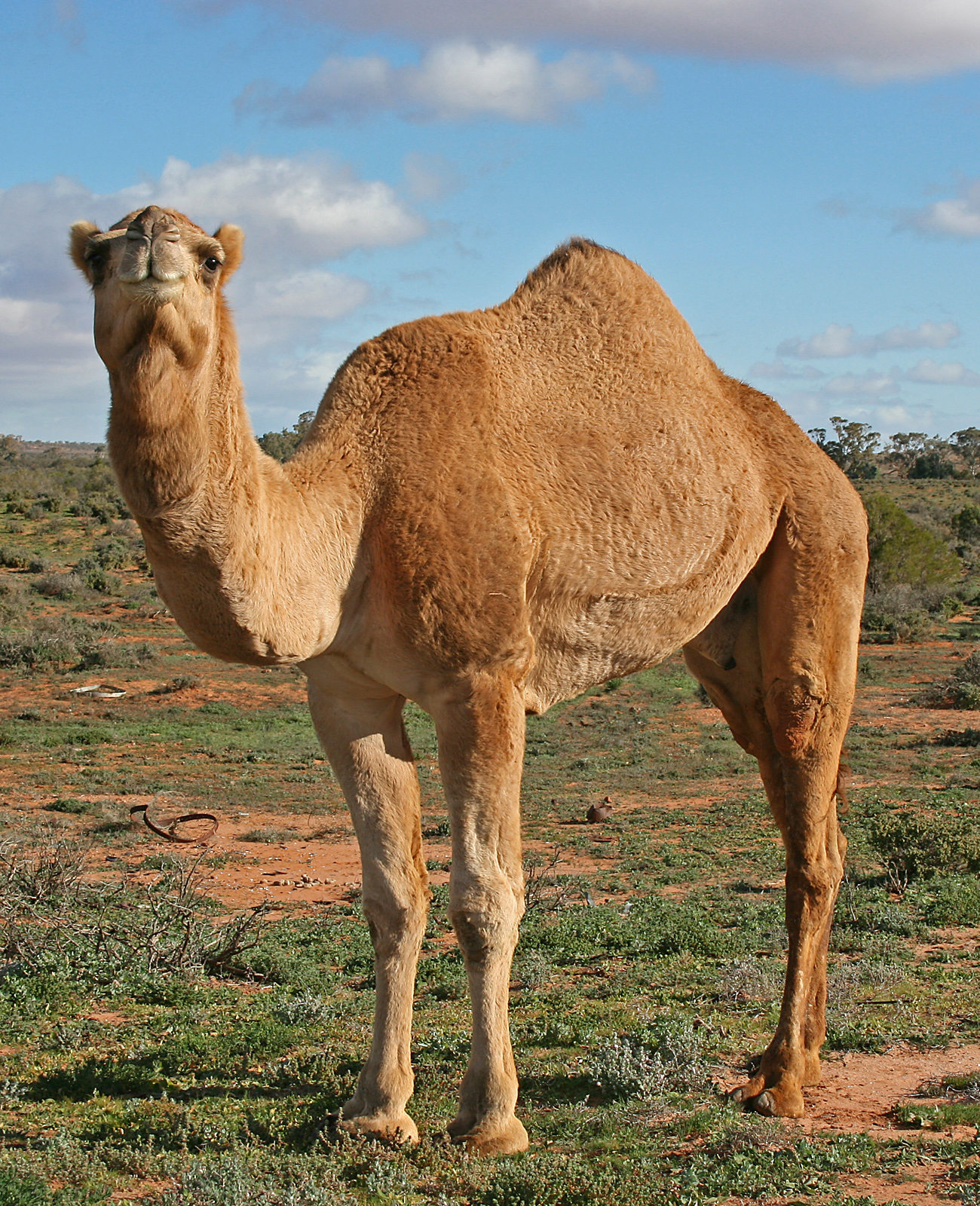
- A dromedary camel

Scientific classification
- Kingdom: Animalia
- Phylum: Chordata
- Class: Mammalia
- Order: Artiodactyla
- Suborder: Tylopoda; Illiger, 1811

Families
- Camelidae and numerous prehistoric families (see text)

= Tylopoda =

Tylopoda Temporal range: Early Eocene–Holocene

Suborder of mammals

Tylopoda (meaning "calloused foot") is a suborder of terrestrial herbivorous even-toed ungulates belonging to the order Artiodactyla. They are found in the wild in their native ranges of South America, Africa, and Asia, while Australian feral camels are introduced. The group has a long fossil history in North America and Eurasia. Tylopoda appeared during the Eocene around 50 million years ago.

Tylopoda has only one extant family, Camelidae, which includes camels, llamas, guanacos, alpacas and vicuñas. This group was much more diverse in the past, containing a number of extinct families in addition to the ancestors of living camelids (see below).

Tylopods are not ruminants.

== Taxonomy and systematics ==
Tylopoda was named by Illiger (1811) and considered monophyletic by Matthew (1908). It was treated as an unranked clade by Matthew (1908) and as a suborder by Carroll (1988), Ursing et al. (2000) and Whistler and Webb (2005). It was assigned to Ruminantia by Matthew (1908); to Artiodactyla by Flower (1883) and Carroll (1988); to Neoselenodontia by Whistler and Webb (2005); and to Cetartiodactyla by Ursing et al. (2000) and by Agnarsson and May-Collado (2008).

The main problem with circumscription of Tylopoda is that the extensive fossil record of camel-like mammals has not yet been thoroughly examined from a cladistic standpoint. Tylopoda is a distinctive lineage among the artiodactyls, but its relationships are elusive because the six living species are closely related and can be considered "living fossils", the sole surviving lineage of a large prehistoric evolutionary radiation. 21st century studies suggest that tylopods are not as closely related to ruminants as traditionally believed, expressed in cladogram form as:

- Artiodactyla
  - Tylopoda (camels)
  - Artiofabula
    - Suina (pigs)
    - Cetruminantia
      - Ruminantia (ruminants)
      - Cetancodonta/ Whippomorpha
        - Hippopotamidae (hippopotamuses)
        - Cetacea (whales)

Tylopoda are extremely conservative in their lifestyle and (like ruminants) seem to have occupied the same ecological niche since their origin over 40 million years ago. Thus, it seems that the previous assumption of a close relationship between Tylopoda and ruminants is simply because all other close relatives (whales, pigs etc.) are so divergent in their adaptations as to have obscured most indications of relationship, or at least those visible to phenetic analyses. However, the rather basal position that Tylopoda appears to have among the even-toed ungulates and relatives means that the oldest members of this lineage are still morphologically very primitive and hard to distinguish from the ancestors of related lineages. The first major modern and comprehensive analysis of the problem (in 2009) supported this; while some taxa traditionally considered Tylopoda could be confirmed to belong to this suborder (and a few refuted), the delimitation of this group is still very much disputed despite (or because of) an extensive fossil record.

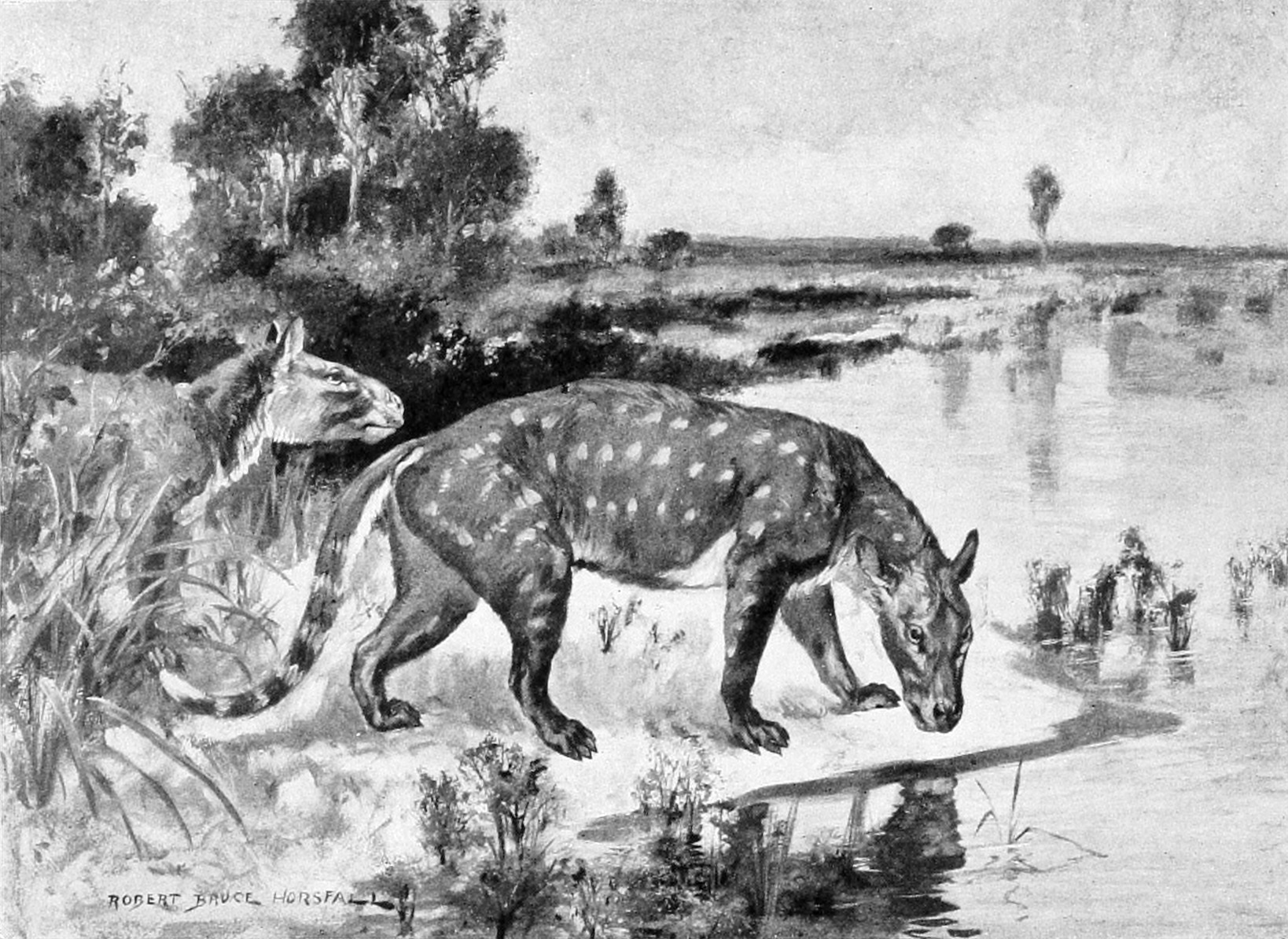
Life restoration of Agriochoerus antiquus

The taxa currently assigned (with some reliability) to Tylopoda are:

Basal and incertae sedis

- Genus †Gobiohyus?
- Family †Homacodontidae

Superfamily Cameloidea

- Family †Oromerycidae
- Family Camelidae

Superfamily †Merycoidodontoidea (=Oreodontoidea)

- Family †"Agriochoeridae" (paraphyletic)
- Family †Merycoidodontidae

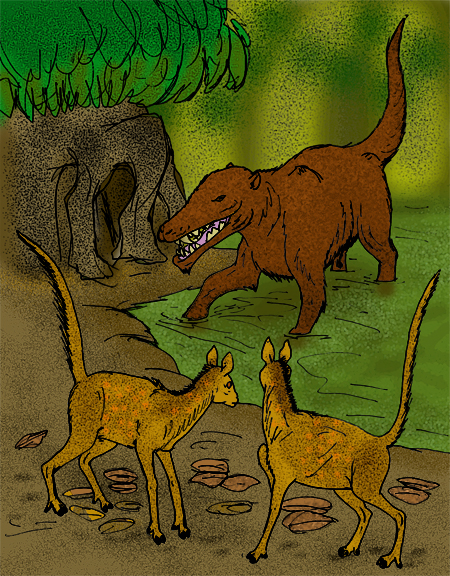
Life restoration of the primitive artiodactyl Gujaratia pakistanensis (foreground) being stalked by Pakicetus

=== Disputed Tylopoda ===
Several additional prehistoric (cet)artiodactyl taxa are sometimes assigned to the Tylopoda, but other authors consider them incertae sedis or basal lineages among the (Cet)artiodactyla or as more closely related to other artiodactyl groups like ruminants:

- Family †Antiacodontidae
- Family †Choeropotamidae (= Haplobunodontidae)
- Family †"Diacodexeidae" (paraphyletic)
- Family †Leptochoeridae
- Family †Anoplotheriidae
- Family †Cainotheriidae
- Family †Xiphodontidae

Some studies have considered Protoceratidae closely related to Tylopoda, but others have considered them more closely related to the ruminants.
