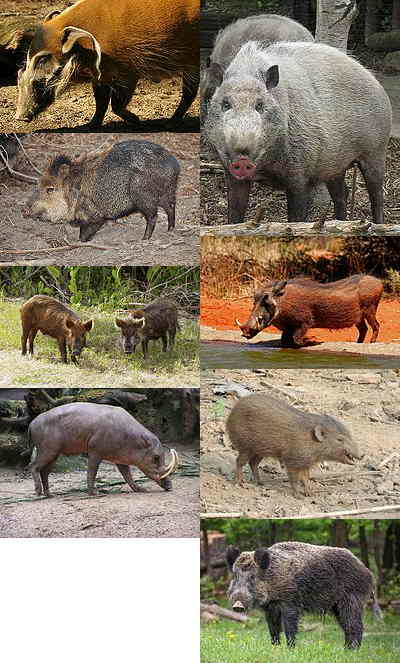
- Eight suine species (counter-clockwise from top left): red river hog (Potamochoerus porcus), collared peccary (Dicotyles tajacu), pigs (Sus scrofa domesticus), north Sulawesi babirusa (Babyrousa celebensis), wild boar (Sus scrofa), pygmy hog (Porcula salvanius), common warthog (Phacochoerus africanus), and Bornean bearded pig (Sus barbatus)

Scientific classification
- Kingdom: Animalia
- Phylum: Chordata
- Class: Mammalia
- Order: Artiodactyla
- Clade: Artiofabula
- Suborder: Suina; Gray, 1868

Genera and families
- †Egatochoerus; †Odoichoerus; †Siamochoerus; Tayassuoidea; †Doliochoeridae; Tayassuidae; Suoidea J.E. Gray, 1868; †Sanitheriidae; Suidae

= Suina =

Suina Temporal range: Late Eocene to Holocene, 33.9–0 Ma

Suborder of mammals

Suina (also known as Suiformes) is a suborder of omnivorous, non-ruminant artiodactyl mammals that includes the domestic pig and peccaries. A member of this clade is known as a suine. Suina includes the family Suidae, termed suids, known in English as pigs or swine, as well as the family Tayassuidae, termed tayassuids or peccaries. Suines are largely native to Africa, South America, and Southeast Asia, with the exception of the wild boar, which is additionally native to Europe and Asia and introduced to North America and Australasia, including widespread use in farming of the domestic pig subspecies. Suines range in size from the 55 cm (22 in) long pygmy hog to the 210 cm (83 in) long giant forest hog, and are primarily found in forest, shrubland, and grassland biomes, though some can be found in deserts, wetlands, or coastal regions. Most species do not have population estimates, though approximately two billion domestic pigs are used in farming, while several species are considered endangered or critically endangered with populations as low as 100. One disputed species, Heude's pig, is considered by the International Union for Conservation of Nature to have gone extinct in the 20th century.

== Classification ==
Suina's placement within Artiodactyla can be represented in the following cladogram:

- Artiodactyla
  - Tylopoda (camels)
  - Artiofabula
    - Suina (pigs)
    - Cetruminantia
      - Ruminantia (ruminants)
      - Cetancodonta/Whippomorpha
        - Hippopotamidae (hippopotamuses)
        - Cetacea (whales)

The suborder Suina consists of 21 extant species in nine genera. These are split between the Suidae family, containing 18 species belonging to 6 genera, and the Tayassuidae family, containing 3 species in 3 genera. This does not include hybrid species such as boar–pig hybrids or extinct prehistoric species. Additionally, one species, Heude's pig, went extinct in the 20th century.

- Family Suidae (Pigs)
  - Genus Babyrousa: four species
  - Genus Hylochoerus: one species
  - Genus Phacochoerus: two species
  - Genus Porcula: one species
  - Genus Potamochoerus: two species
  - Genus Sus: nine species
- Family Tayassuidae (Peccaries)
  - Genus Catagonus: one species
  - Genus Dicotyles: one species
  - Genus Tayassu: one species

- Suina
  - Suidae
    - - - Sus
        - Porcula
      - - Potamochoerus
        - - Hylochoerus
          - Phacochoerus
    - Babyrousa
  - Tayassuidae
    - Dicotyles
    - - Tayassu
      - Catagonus
