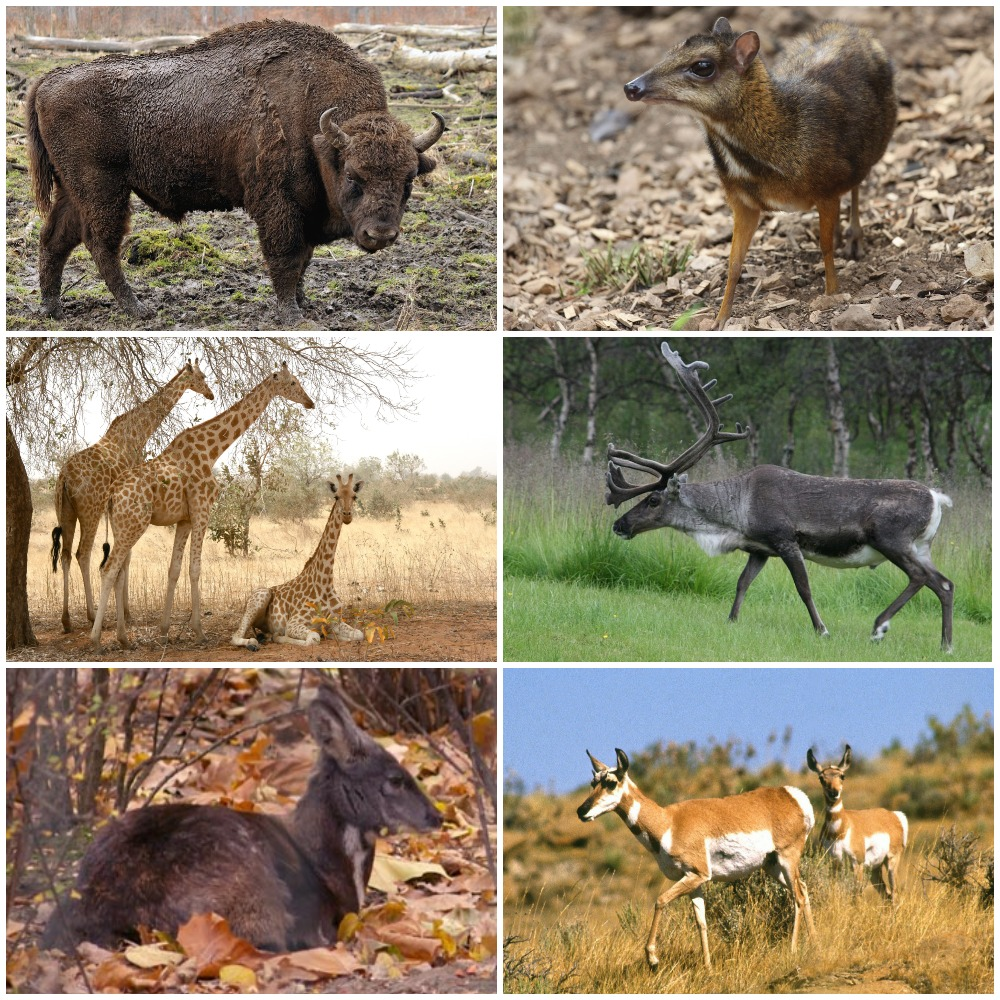

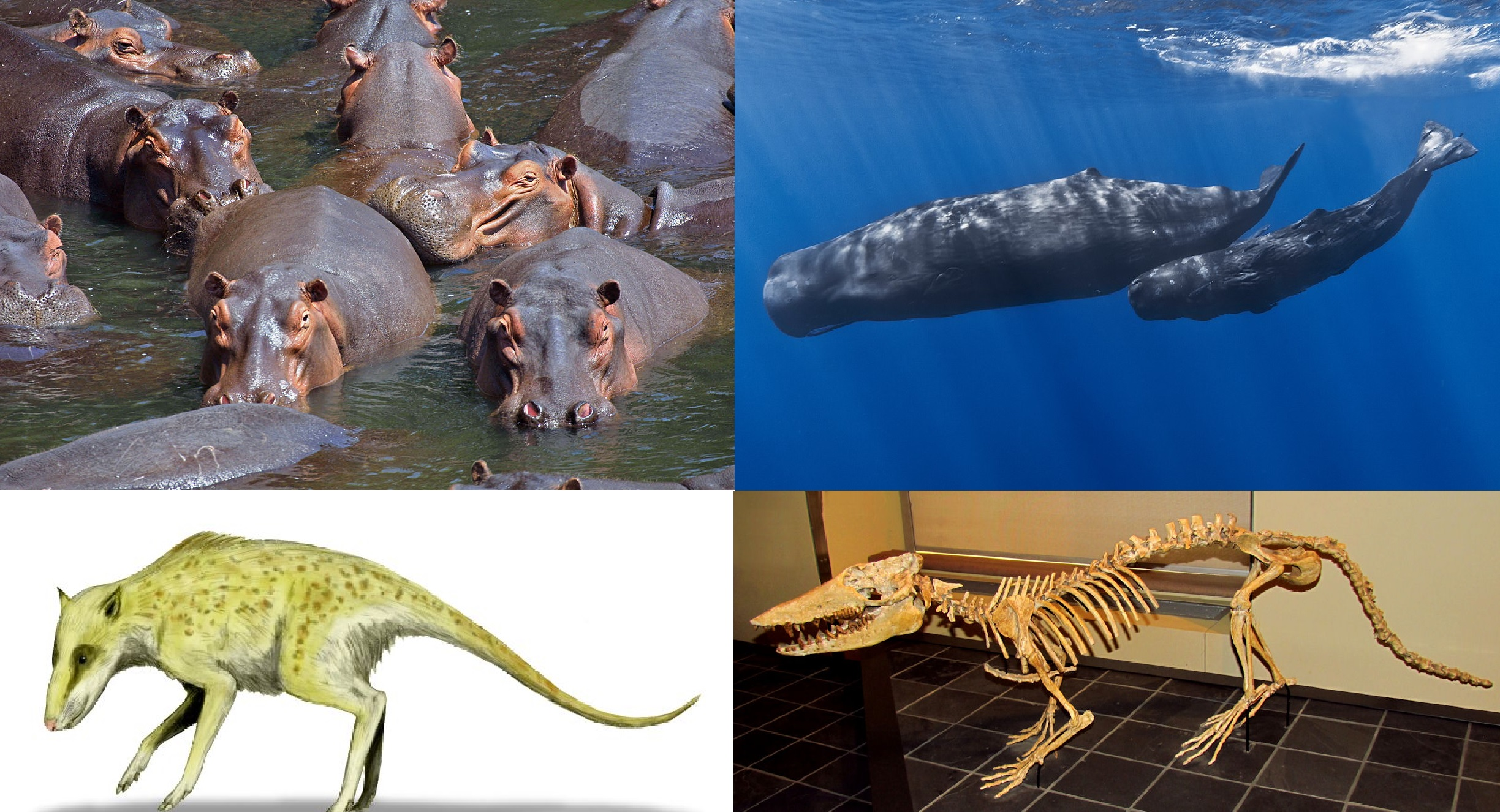

Scientific classification
- Kingdom: Animalia
- Phylum: Chordata
- Class: Mammalia
- Order: Artiodactyla
- Clade: Artiofabula
- Clade: Cetruminantia; Waddell et al. 1999

Subgroups
- Cetancodontamorpha; Ruminantiamorpha

= Cetruminantia =

Cetruminantia Temporal range: Early Eocene–Present

Taxonomic clade

The Cetruminantia are a clade made up of the Cetancodontamorpha (or Whippomorpha) and their closest living relatives, the Ruminantia.

Chital are a member of Ruminantiamorpha

Orcas are a member of Cetancodontamorpha

Cetruminantia's placement within Artiodactyla can be represented in the following cladogram:

- Artiodactyla
  - Tylopoda (camels)
  - Artiofabula
    - Suina (pigs)
    - Cetruminantia
      - Ruminantia (ruminants)
      - Whippomorpha (or Cetancodonta)
        - Hippopotamidae (hippopotamuses)
        - Cetacea (whales)

== Classification ==
- Order Artiodactyla (even-toed ungulates)
  - Tylopoda (camelids)
  - Artiofabula (ruminants, pigs, peccaries, whales, and dolphins)
    - Suina (pigs and peccaries)
    - Cetruminantia (ruminants, whales, and dolphins)
      - Suborder Ruminantia (antelope, buffalo, cattle, goats, sheep, deer, giraffes, and chevrotains)
        - Family Antilocapridae (pronghorn)
        - Family Bovidae, 135 species (antelope, bison, buffalo, cattle, goats, and sheep)
        - Family Cervidae, 55~94 species (deer, elk, and moose)
        - Family Giraffidae, 2 species (giraffes, okapis)
        - Family Moschidae, 4~7 species (musk deer)
        - Family Tragulidae, 6~10 species (chevrotains, or mouse deer)
      - Suborder Whippomorpha (aquatic or semi-aquatic even-toed ungulates)
        - Infraorder Ancodonta
          - Family Hippopotamidae, 2 species (hippopotamuses)
        - Infraorder Cetacea (whales, dolphins, and porpoises)
          - Mysticeti (baleen whales)
            - Family Balaenidae, 2~4 species (right whales and bowhead whales)
            - Family Balaenopteridae, 6~9 species (rorquals)
            - Family Eschrichtiidae, 1 species (gray whale)
            - Family Neobalaenidae, 1 species (pygmy right whale)
          - Odontoceti (toothed whales, dolphins, and porpoises)
            - Superfamily Delphinoidea (dolphins, arctic whales, porpoises, and relatives)
              - Family Delphinidae, 38 species (dolphins, killer whales, and relatives)
              - Family Monodontidae, 2 species (beluga and narwhal)
              - Family Phocoenidae, 6 species (porpoises)
            - Superfamily Physeteroidea (sperm whales)
              - Family Kogiidae, 2 species (pygmy and dwarf sperm whales)
              - Family Physeteridae, 1 species (common sperm whale)
            - Superfamily Ziphoidea (beaked whales)
              - Family Ziphidae, 22 species (modern beaked whales)
            - Superfamily Platanistoidea (river dolphins)
              - Family Iniidae, 1~3 species (South American river dolphin(s))
              - Family Lipotidae, 1 species (baiji or Chinese river dolphin)
              - Family Platanistidae, 1~2 species (Asian river dolphin(s))
              - Family Pontoporiidae, 1 species (La Plata dolphin)
