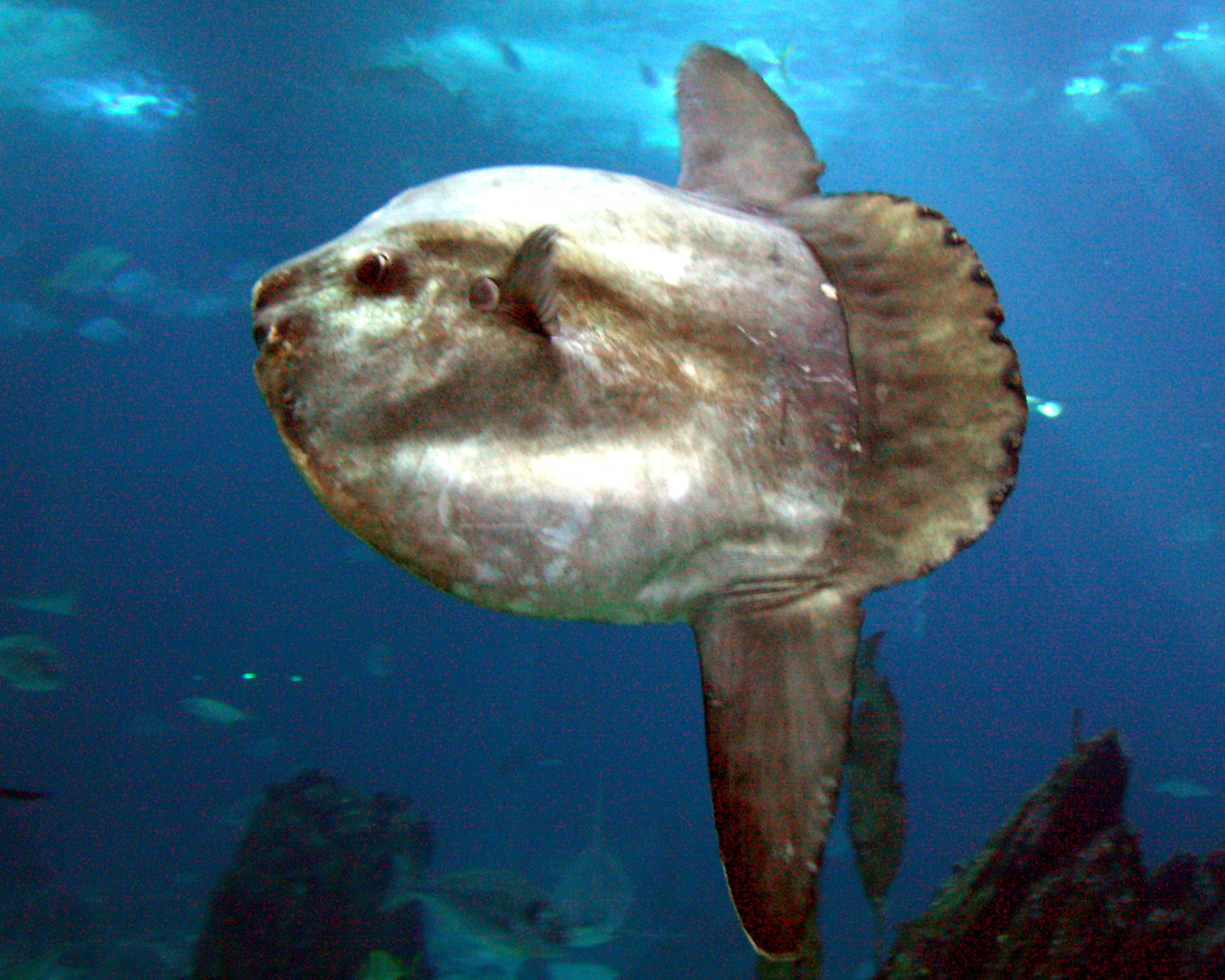
- Mola mola

Scientific classification
- Kingdom: Animalia
- Phylum: Chordata
- Class: Actinopterygii
- Division: Teleostei
- Order: Tetraodontiformes
- Family: Molidae
- Genus: Mola; Linck, 1790

= Mola (fish) =

Mola Temporal range: Late Miocene to Recent

Genus of fishes

Mola is the type genus of the family Molidae, including marine fish commonly known as ocean sunfish. Mola includes three of the five species within Molidae, as well as one extinct species. Species within Mola are differentiated from the other species within Molidae by their larger size in comparison to the other two members of the family. In Latin, the name "Mola" means "millstone", referencing the round, flat shape of ocean sunfish. This genus includes the heaviest of all living bony fishes, Mola alexandrini.

== Taxonomy ==
In 1766, Joseph Kölreuter published a fish name Mola but did not treat it as a Linnaean genus (i.e. not binomial), so the name is invalid under the rules of the ICZN. The first author who used the name Mola as a valid genus was Johann Heinrich Linck the Younger in 1790. Mola is therefore the oldest available name, with the basionym Tetraodon mola Linnaeus, 1758 as its type species.

=== Species ===
The genus was considered monotypic for several decades, but modern taxonomic work revalidated one species and described another; the following species are currently recognized within this genus:

- Mola mola (Linnaeus, 1758) (Ocean sunfish)
- Mola alexandrini (Giglioli, 1883) (Southern sunfish)
- Mola tecta Nyegaard et al., 2017 (Hoodwinker sunfish)
- †Mola pileata (extinct), Upper Miocene to Middle Miocene

The following cladogram is based on a 2017 study of mitochondrial D-loop sequences and its maximum likelihood phylogenetic tree:

- Mola
  - - Mola tecta (sp. C)
    - Mola cf. ramsayi (sp. A)
  - Mola mola (sp. B)
    - Atlantic clade
    - Pacific clade
- Masturus lanceolatus

== Description ==
Molas develop their truncated, bullet-like shape because of their tail fin. The tail fin never grows but folds into itself as the fish matures, which creates a rounded rudder called a clavus. Mola in Latin means "millstone" and describes the ocean sunfish's somewhat circular, flattened shape. They are a silvery colour and have a rough skin texture.

Molas are the heaviest of all the extant bony fishes: large specimens reach 4.3 m (14 ft) vertically and 3 m (10 ft) horizontally, and can weigh over 2,700 kg (6,000 lbs).

Molas inhabit temperate and tropical oceans around the world. They are frequently seen basking in the sun near the surface and are often mistaken for sharks when their huge dorsal fins emerge above the water. Their teeth are fused into a beak-like structure, and they are unable to fully close their relatively small mouths.

Molas can become infested with skin parasites, so they often invite small fish or even birds to feed on them. Sunfish sometimes breach the surface up to 3 m (10 ft) in the air in an attempt to shake off parasites.

Their food of choice is jellyfish, though they will eat small fish and large amounts of gelatinous zooplankton as well as algae. They are harmless to people, but can be very curious and will often approach divers.

Their population is considered vulnerable, as they are frequently snagged in drift gillnets and can suffocate on plastic bags, which resemble jellyfish, their main food source.

They breed by producing around 300 million eggs directly into the ocean (spawning), which are externally fertilized by sperm in the water column.
