= Accacoelium contortum =

Scientific classification
- Kingdom: Animalia
- Phylum: Platyhelminthes
- Class: Trematoda
- Order: Plagiorchiida
- Family: Accacoeliidae
- Genus: Accacoelium
- Species: A. contortum

Binomial name
- Accacoelium contortum (Rudolphi, 1819)

Species of fluke

Accacoelium contortum is a parasitic flatworm of the class Trematoda. It lives in the gills and oral cavity of the ocean sunfish, Mola mola, and was first described by Swedish-born naturalist Karl Rudolphi in 1819. Accacoelium contortum is the type-species of the family Accacoeliidae and the only known species of the genus Accacoelium.

Accacoelium contortum is one of the most common sunfish parasites and has been reported in the Mediterranean Sea, the Northeast Atlantic Ocean and the South Pacific. In a study in Spain, 47.2% of 106 sunfish examined were found to host Accacoelium contortum.

Most trematodes are internal parasites (endoparasites), but Accacoelium contortum is also found on the outside of its host. It has an elongated body with oral and ventral suckers and papillate anterior. It lacks the hooks and clamps found on most other external parasites, and instead attaches using the ventral sucker. The parasite also developed a strong ventral musculature in the hindbody which it uses like a prehensile tail to grasp onto other parasites, aiding in the formation of larger clusters of the parasite. It is found in clusters in the mouth, gills, pharynx, and pharyngeal teeth, but can also survive in the gastrointestinal tract.

Accacoelium contortum induces a strong immune response in its host when infecting the oropharyngeal chamber, leading to inflammation, hyperplasia and necrosis at the site of attachment. In some cases, the parasites can end up encased in host tissue. This might actually work to the parasite's advantage because now it is enclosed in a small flesh bag that is tightly secured to the host body. In high infections with large numbers of the parasite, if a wide gill area is damaged it can prevent normal gas exchange, which can compromise the survival of the ocean sunfish. Strangely, when infecting areas in the stomach and esophagus the parasite are scattered rather than clustered and are not correlated to changes are damage in the epithelium near the site of infection.

Accacoelium contortum also infects the right gill at significantly higher rates than the left gill. This is believed to be caused by the host's tendency to swim in the water column and rest at the surface with its left side up, which exposes it to more sunlight, UV radiation, and air.
