= Aqua World =

- Aquarium logo

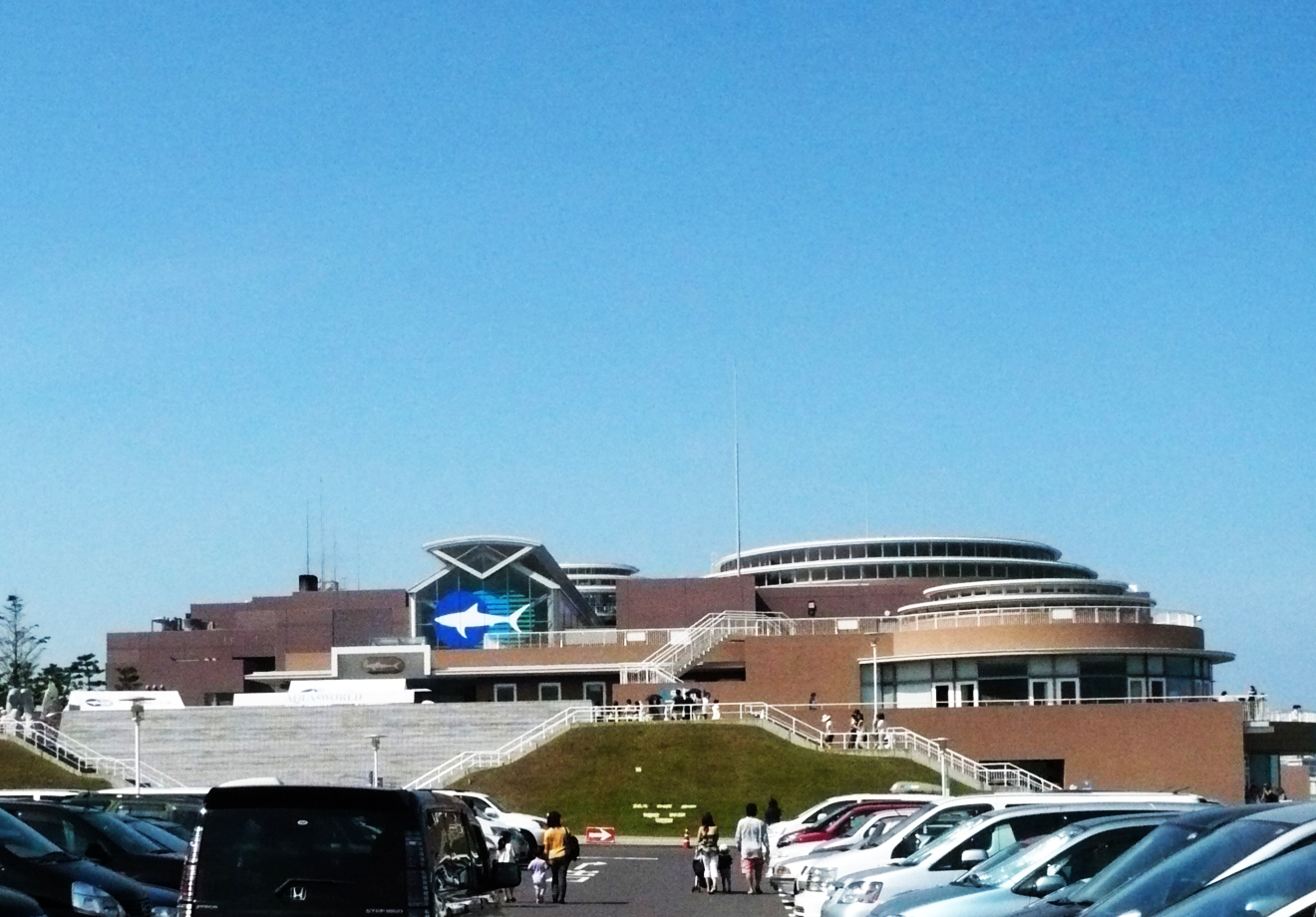
- Aqua World
- Interactive map of Aqua World
- 36°20′00″N 140°35′38″E
- Date opened: April 2002 (as Aqua World)
- Location: Oarai, Ibaraki, Japan
- Land area: 19,800 m^{2} (213,000 sq ft)
- No. of animals: 68,000
- No. of species: 580
- Total volume of tanks: 5,100,000 litres (1,347,000 US gal)
- Annual visitors: 1,100,000 (2008)
- Website: https://www.aquaworld-oarai.com/en/

Aqua World (アクアワールド・大洗, Akua Wārudo Oarai), formerly the Ibaraki Prefectural Oarai Aquarium (茨城県大洗水族館, Ibaraki-ken Oarai suizokukan), is a 19,800 square metres (213,000 sq ft) aquarium in the Higashiibaraki District of Ibaraki Prefecture, Japan, north of Oarai port at the mouth of the Naka River.

The aquarium focuses on displaying sharks, with 59 types of sharks living in the aquarium. Many varieties of marine species can be found in Aqua World. The fee for entry varies according to age group. The aquarium is accredited as a Museum-equivalent facilities by the Museum Act from Ministry of Education, Culture, Sports, Science and Technology.

== History ==
=== Prefectural Oarai Aquarium (1952-1970) ===
The Ibaraki Prefectural Office established the "Oarai Prefectural Natural Park" in 1951 in order to diversify the year-round availability of activities for leisure and tourism. The aquarium opened in June 1952 and the Oarai golf club opened in 1953. The prefectural Oarai aquarium was built several hundred meters south of the current building, and has a gate with a Ryugu castle motif and a basin-like appearance. It was characterized by a pool. Although it was small, with an area of about 165.3 m^{2} (1,779 sq ft), it was a state-of-the-art facility at the time when aquariums were still rare. At the time of opening, the aquarium had more than 200,000 visitors a year and about 2.5 million bathers. By the time it closed in September 1970 to increase the floor space, a total of 2.6 million people visited.

=== Oarai Aquarium, Children's Country of the Sea (1970-2001) ===
In November 1970, the "Oarai Children's Country Oarai Aquarium" and "Oarai Children's Country Pool" opened in the same place as the current building. From this time, the social welfare corporation Ibaraki Cultural Welfare Corporation will be operated. This aquarium introduced the world's first large-scale tank made of seamless 40 m (130 ft) glass, and the number of visitors for the 10 years from 1970 to 1980 was 600, as the facilities were expanded and the exhibition method was changed according to the changing times. There were more than 10,000 people, and there were 7,000 fish of 280 species at that time.

In 1999, the cultural division of the social welfare corporation Ibaraki Cultural Welfare Corporation was separated and moved to the Ibaraki Cultural Promotion Foundation, which became the operation of the foundation. In May 2001, the museum will be closed due to deterioration.

== Overview ==
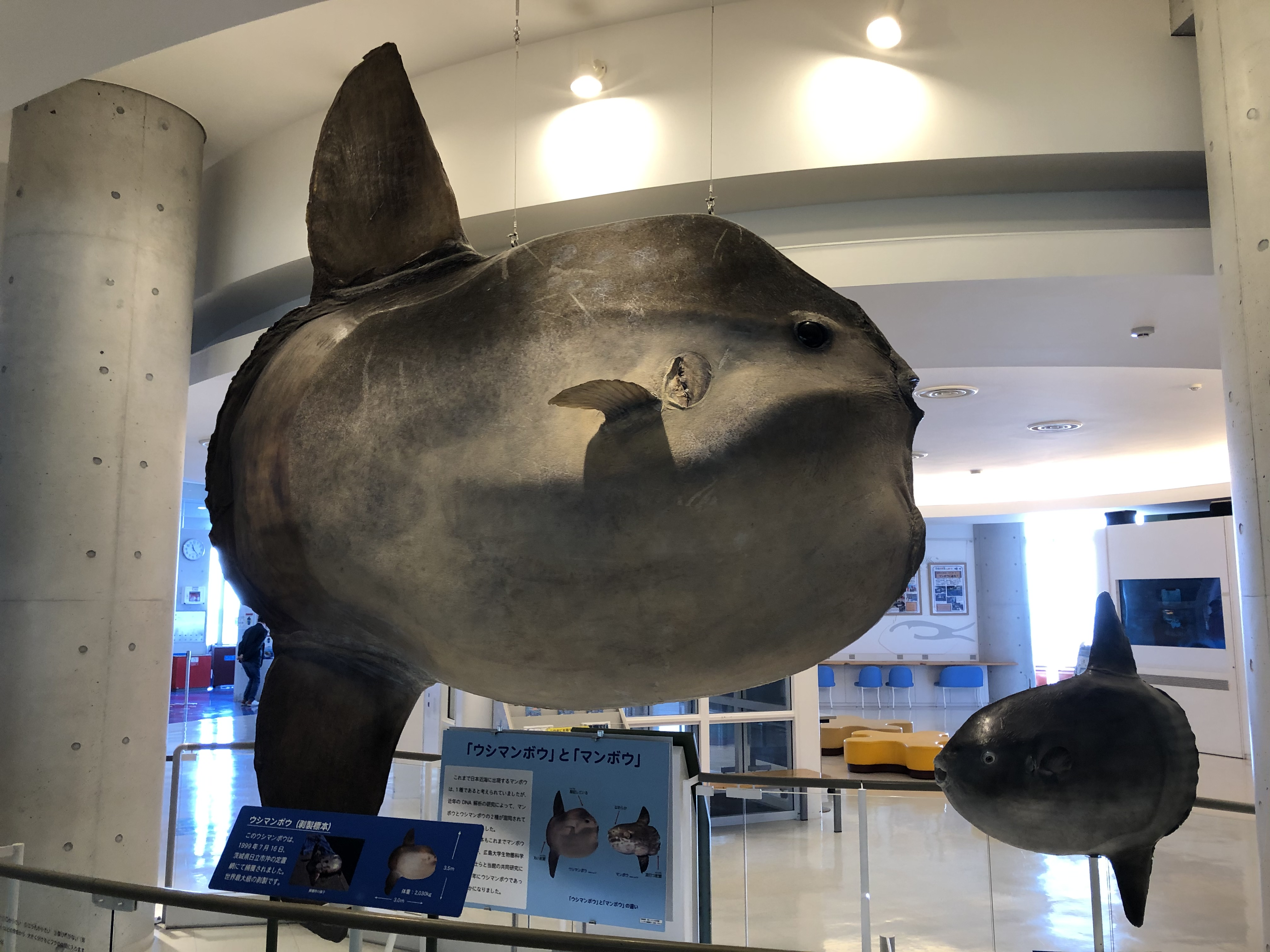
Mola alexandrini

The aquarium contains 60 tanks, with a total tank volume of 5,100 cubic metres (1,300,000 US gal). The largest tank contains 20,000 individuals of about 80 species. The shark tank contains five species of sharks, and includes a tunnel which lets visitors walk under the fish. The 270-cubic-metre (71,000 US gal) sunfish tank contains eight individual ocean sunfish. In particular, aquariums focusing on breeding the symbol mark "shark", and the number of species is 59 (as of April 2021), which is the largest in Japan. In the museum, the mounted ocean sunfish (Mola alexandrini) (total length 3 m (9.8 ft) and a height of 3.5 m (11 ft)) is the world's largest of its kind. There is a taxidermied basking shark (total length 8.3 m (27 ft)) and the largest kids' corner in Japanese aquariums. The exhibition consists of eight zones with marketplaces and food courts by theme. With the basic theme of "Ibaraki Sea and Nature, World Sea and Global Environment," the exhibition will deepen your understanding of the global environment. It is the first aquarium in Japan to hold a penguin show.

Marine mammals in the aquarium include sea otters, California sea lions, and spotted seals. Seabirds are represented by Humboldt penguins and tufted puffins. In 2021, the breeding sand tiger gave birth to the first pup in Japan.

== Exhibits ==
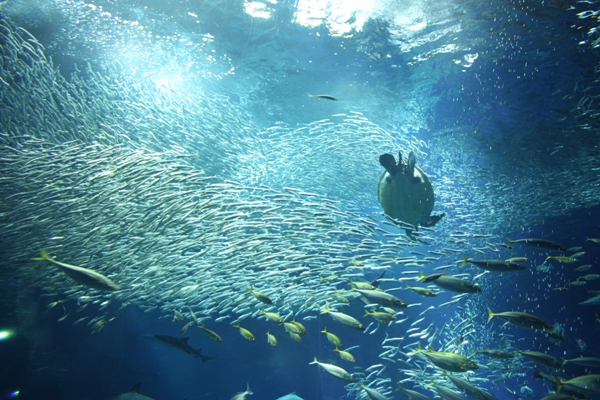
Sea of encounter tank

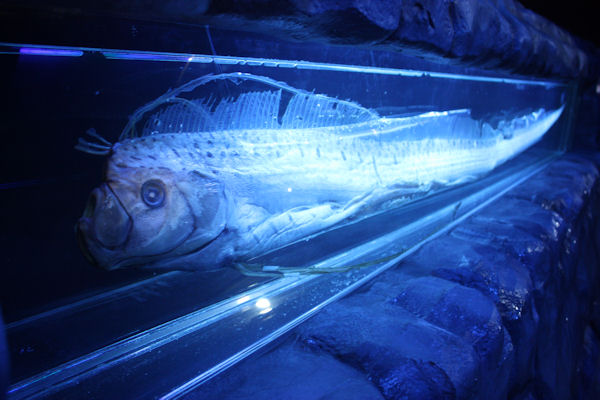
Oarfish

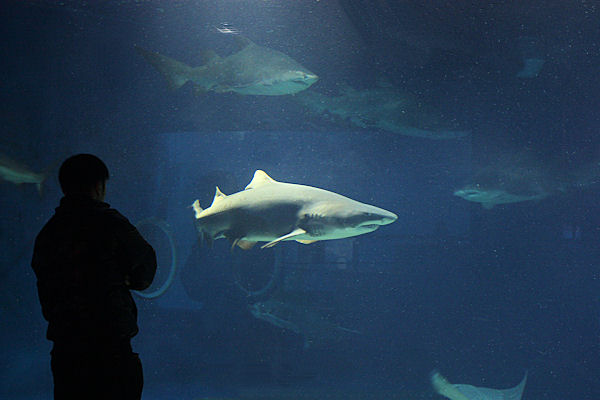
shark

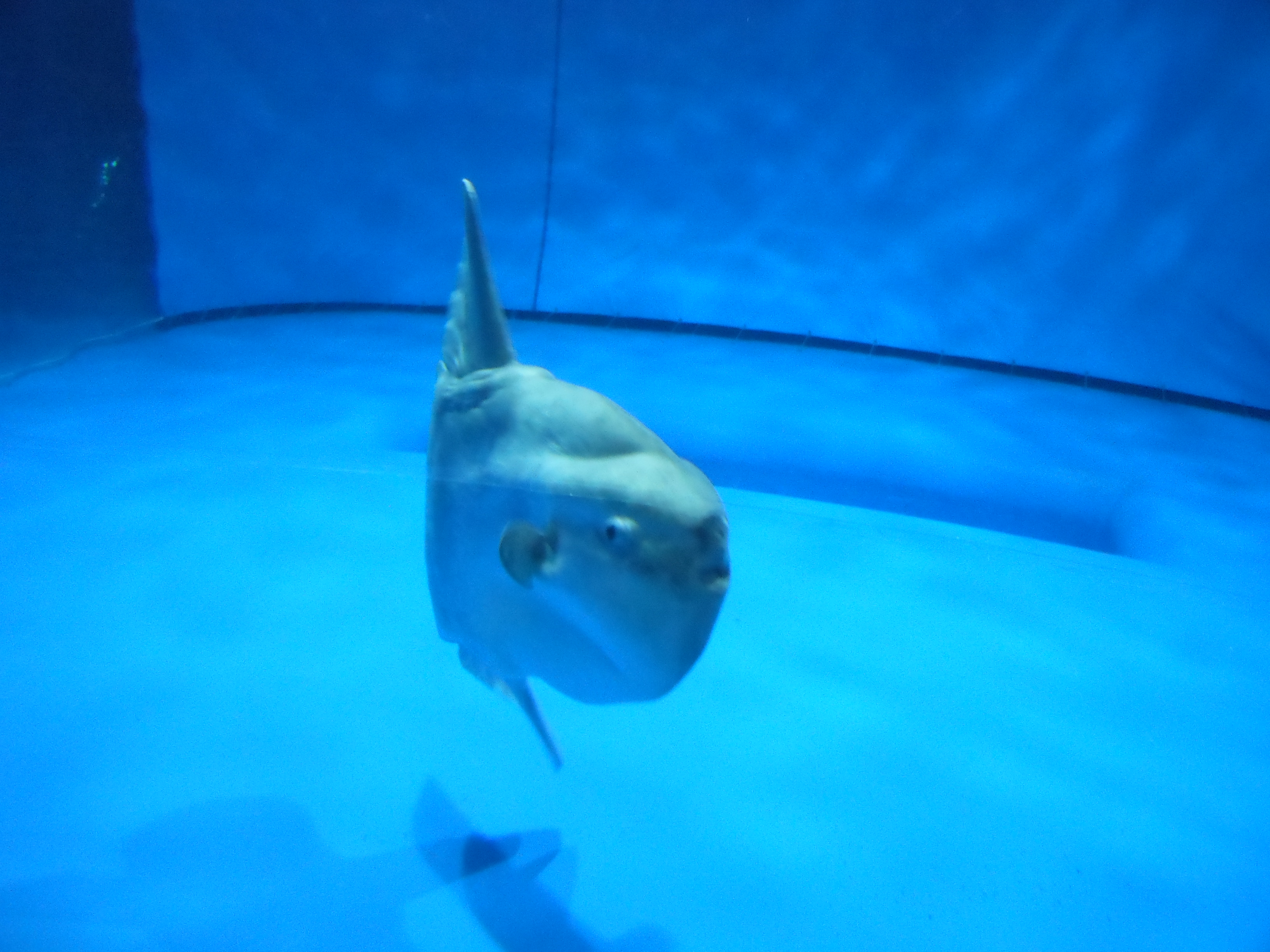
ocean sunfish

=== Sea of Encounter Zone ===
The largest tank in the building at the entrance (3rd floor). The creatures that live in the sea near Oarai are on display.

=== Dark Sea Zone ===
Contains various deep-sea fish, jellyfish, and deep-sea creatures at the theater.

=== World Sea Zone 1 ===
From Okinawa to Hokkaido, aquarium captivity marine life in the wet zone area, tropical area, and cold zone area. It is an area where ocean sunfish and sharks are captivity, and aquarium are focusing on the exhibition and education of the Coral and Okhotsk Seas.

=== World Sea Zone 2 ===
Seabirds, sea animals living in the North Sea, such as Tufted Puffin, Spotted Seal have been captivity.

=== Museum ===
The third floor contain the Sea Life Museum and the Ocean Information Plaza. Hands-on exhibits in these areas let visitors learn about the anatomy and behavior of fish and other sea life. The exhibit contains sections on seaweed, plankton, and sharks, as well as a display where visitors can hear the calls of all 18 penguin species. There is the world's largest sunfish taxidermy, a lecture room where you can observe experiments, and the largest indoor play equipment "Kids Land" in Japan's aquarium.

=== Forest and River Zone / Encounter Deck ===
The river zone aims to reproduce the nature found in the Naka River, containing creatures such as the three-spined stickleback and salmon, which actually spawn in autumn.

=== Ocean Zone ===
The Ocean Theater has dolphin and whale shows, as well as an underwater viewing area. You can observe Dolphin / Sea Lion Ocean Live, which has a seating capacity of 800 people, and sea lions and penguins outside.

== Gallery ==
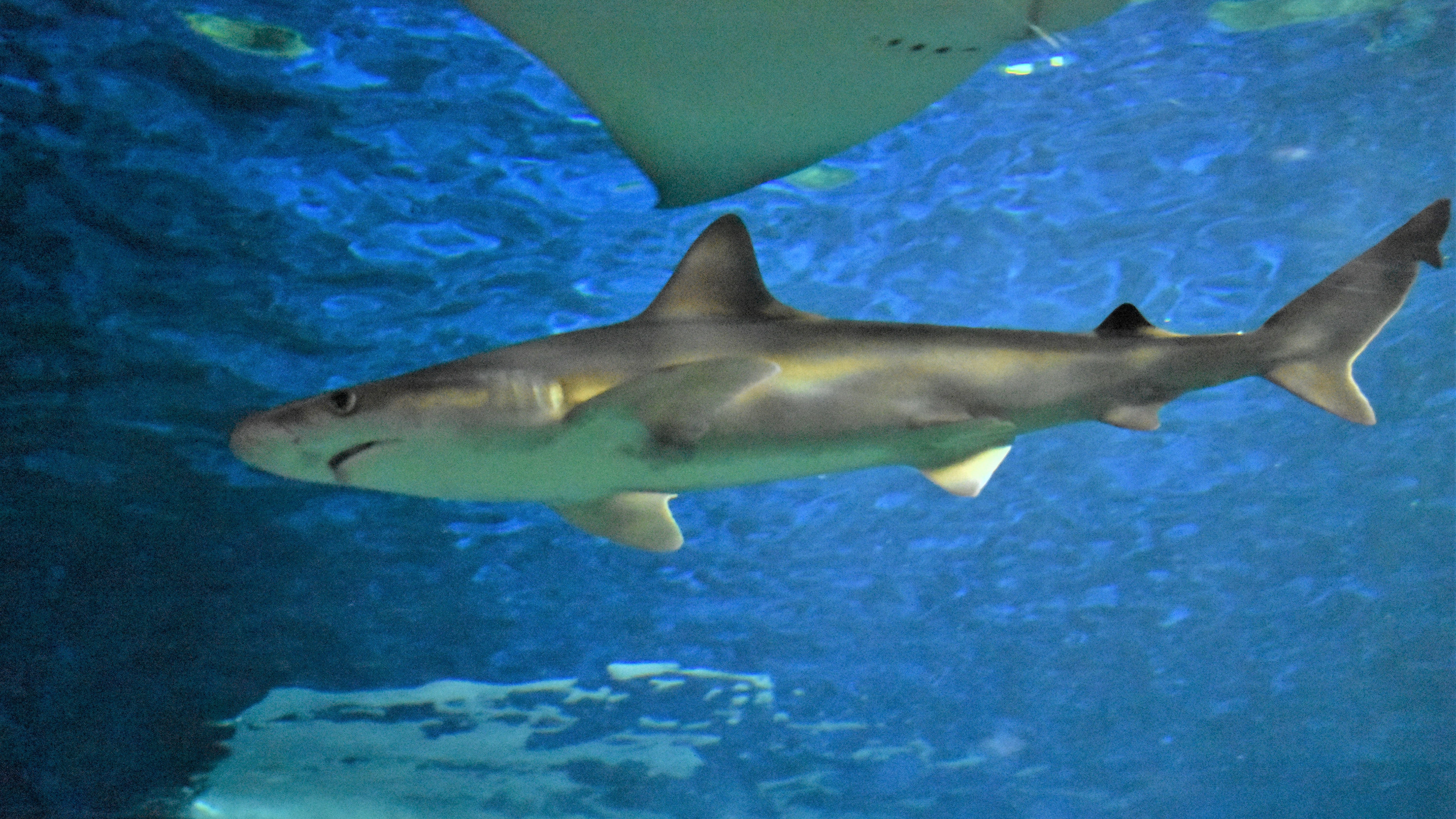

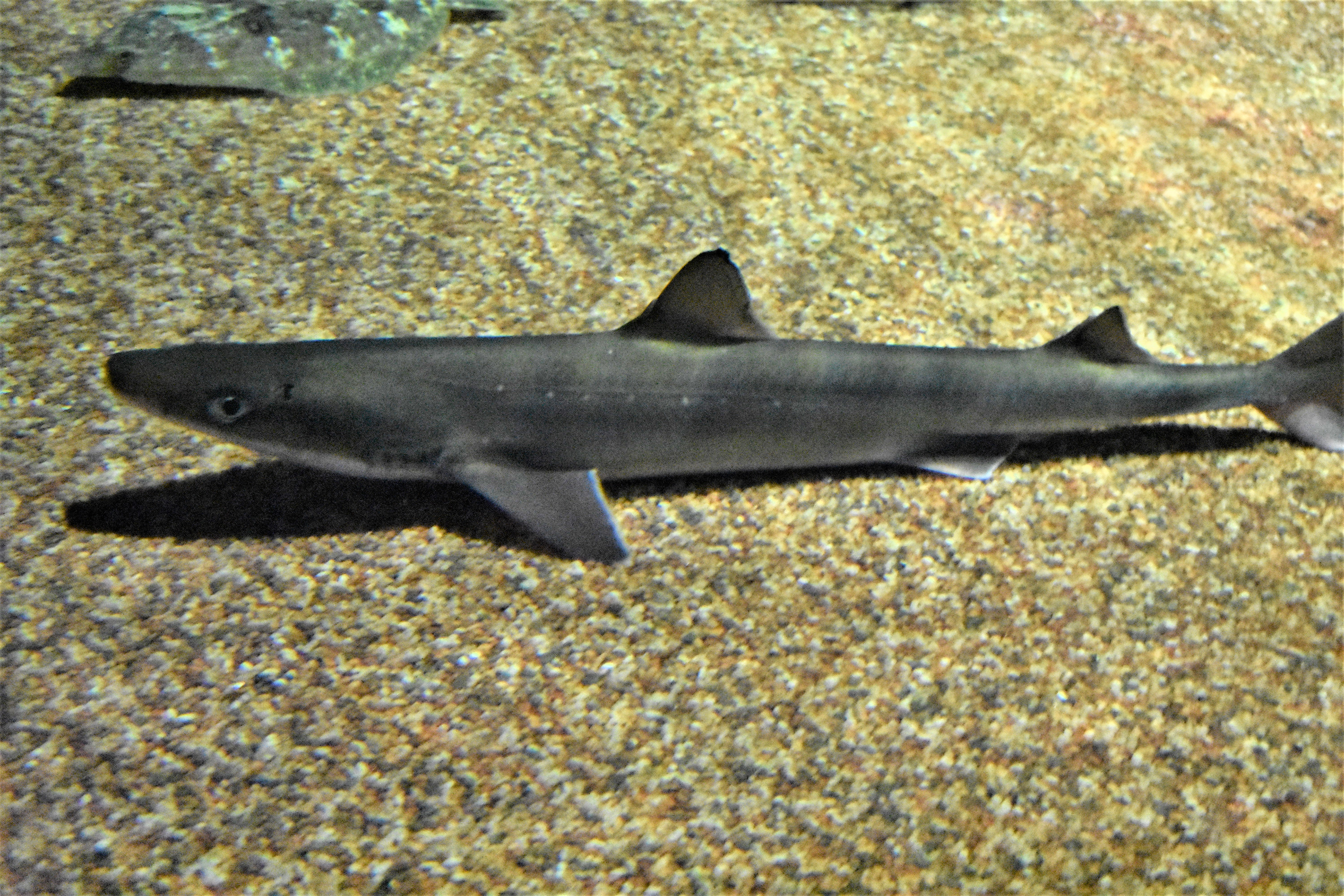

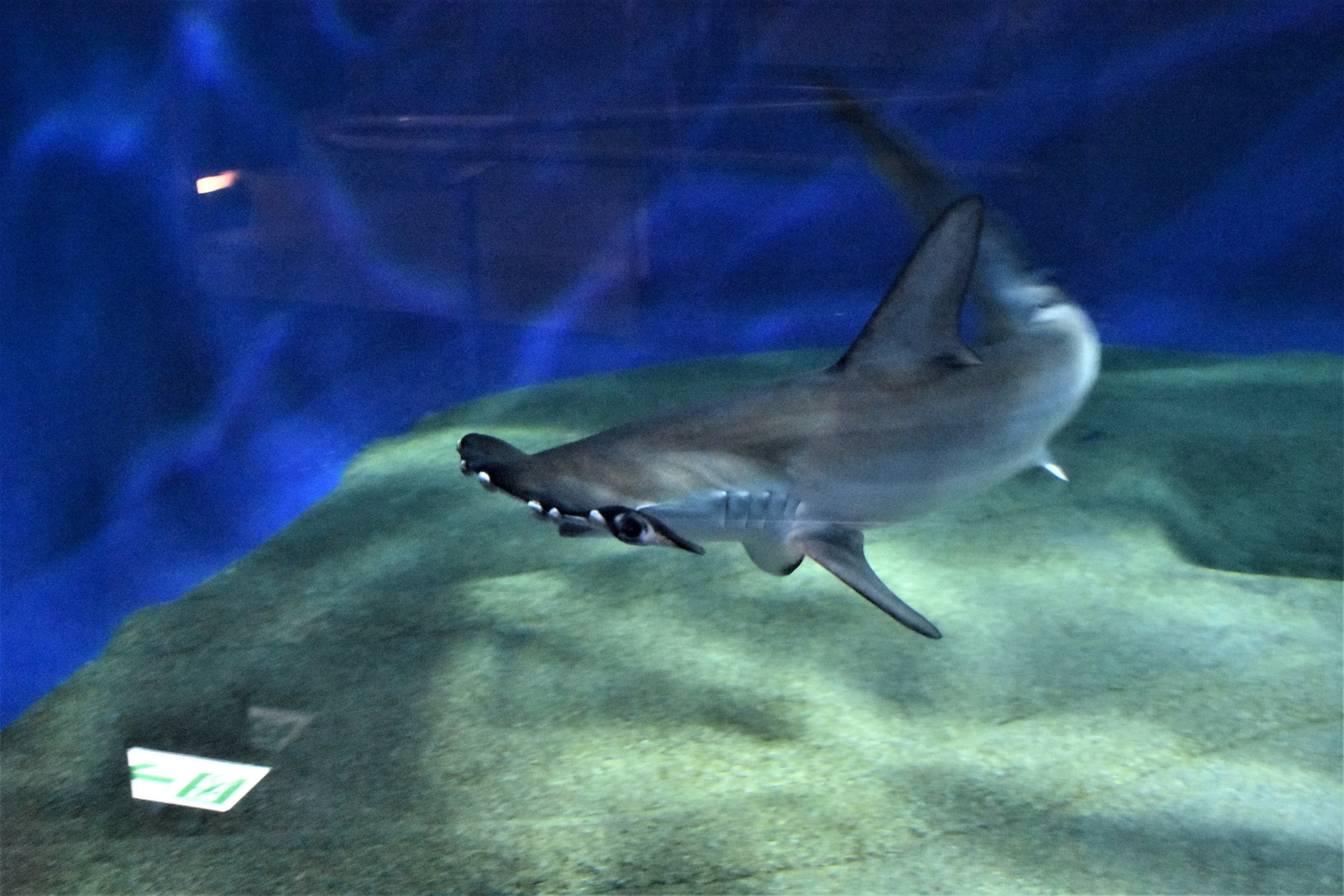

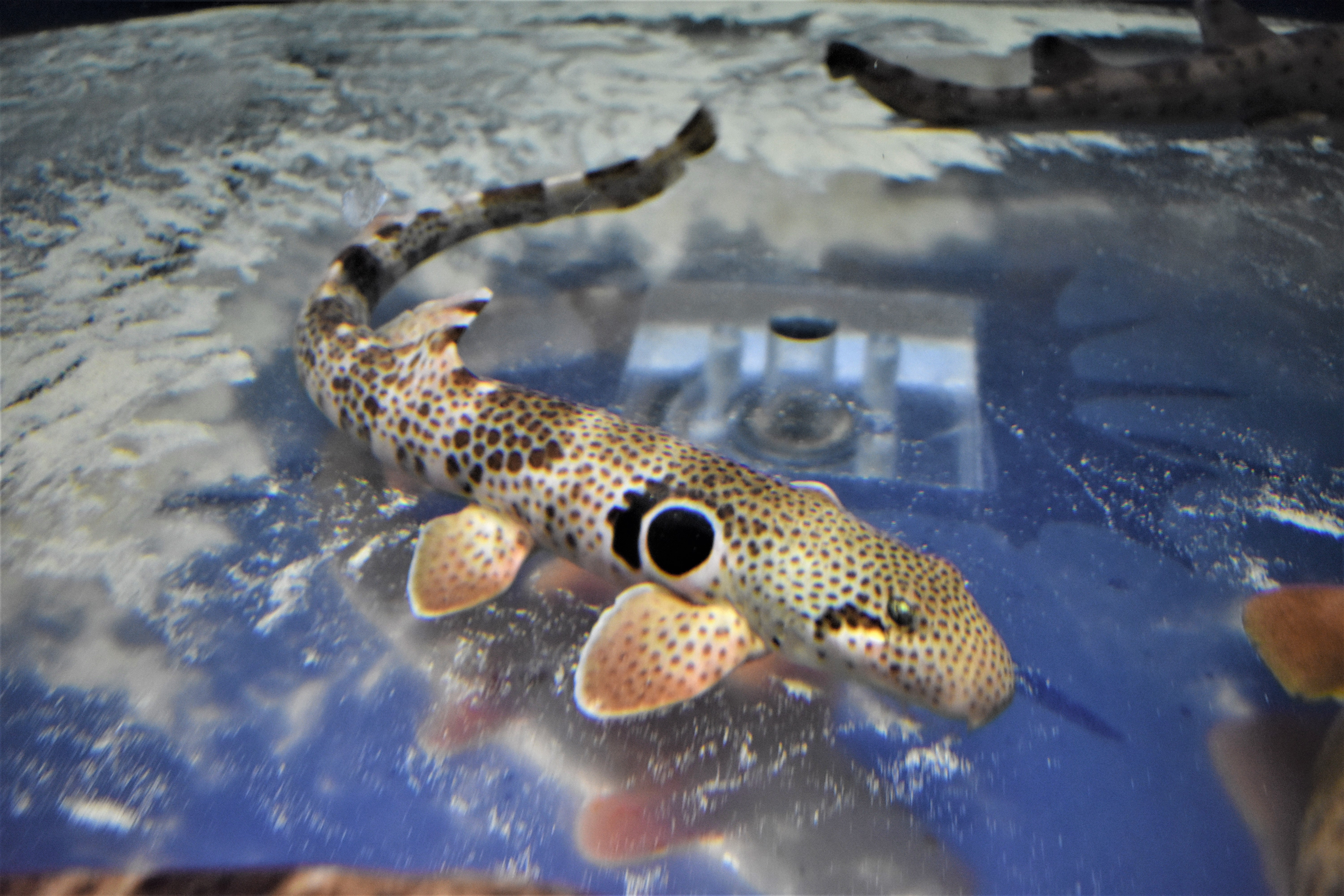

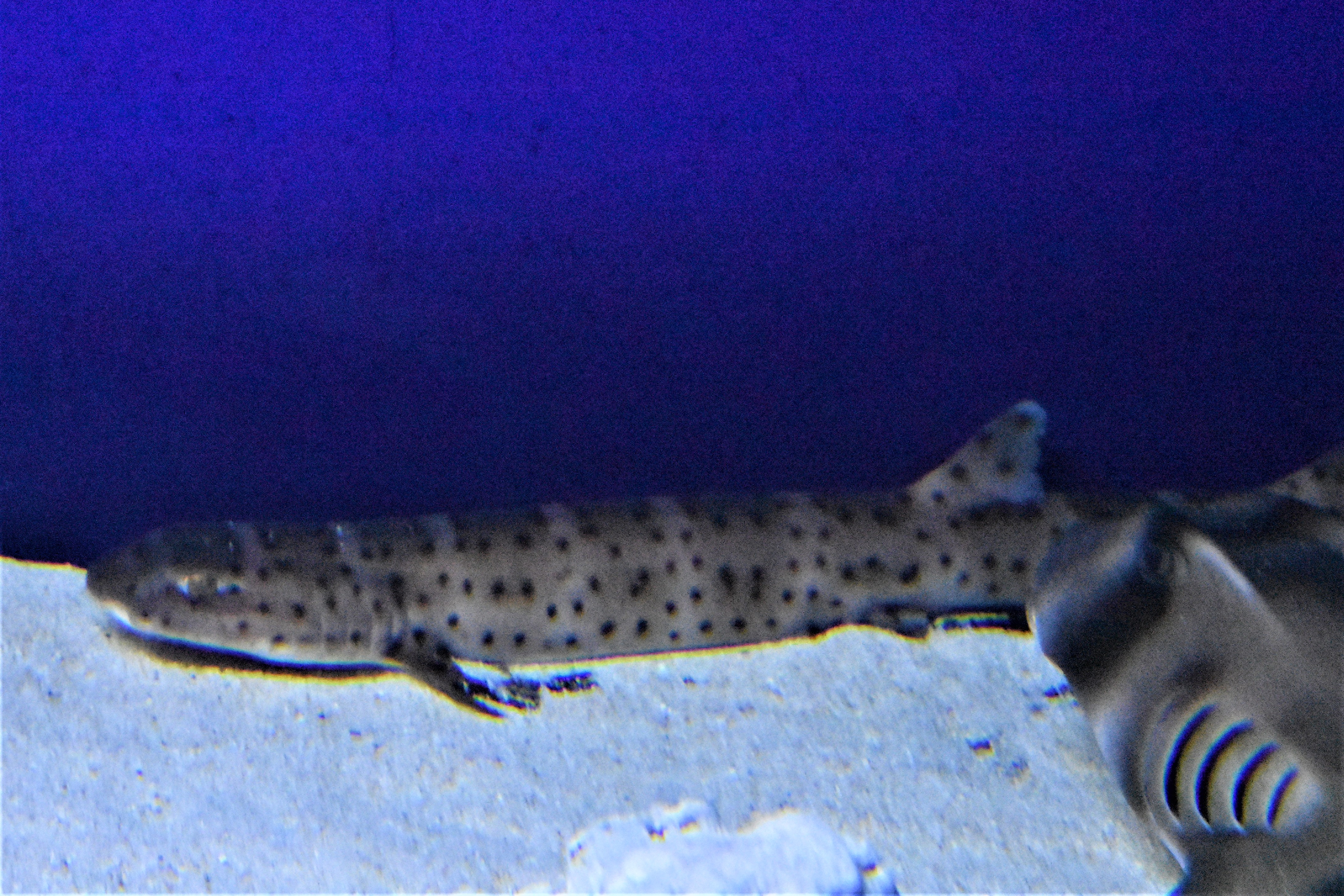

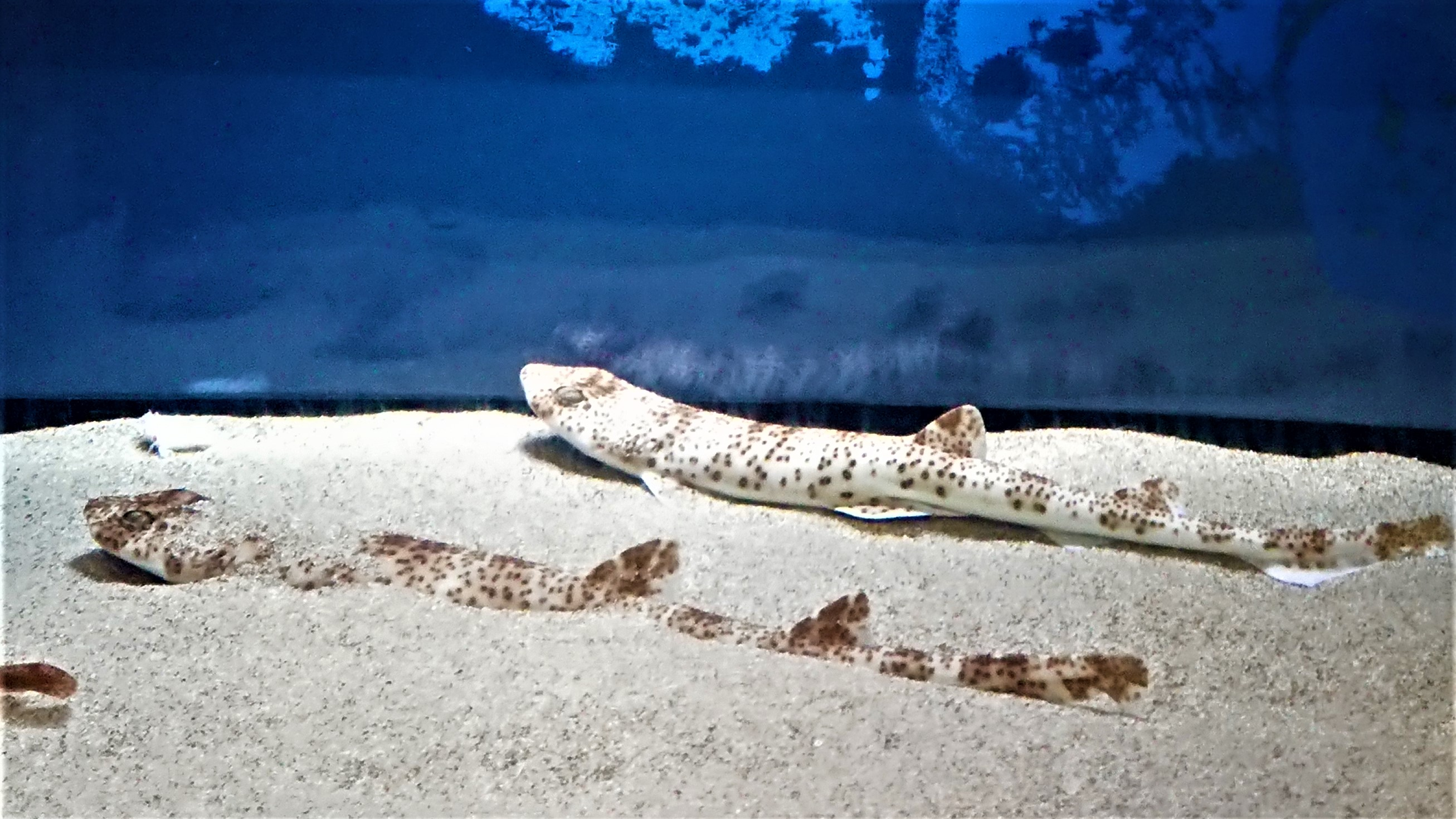

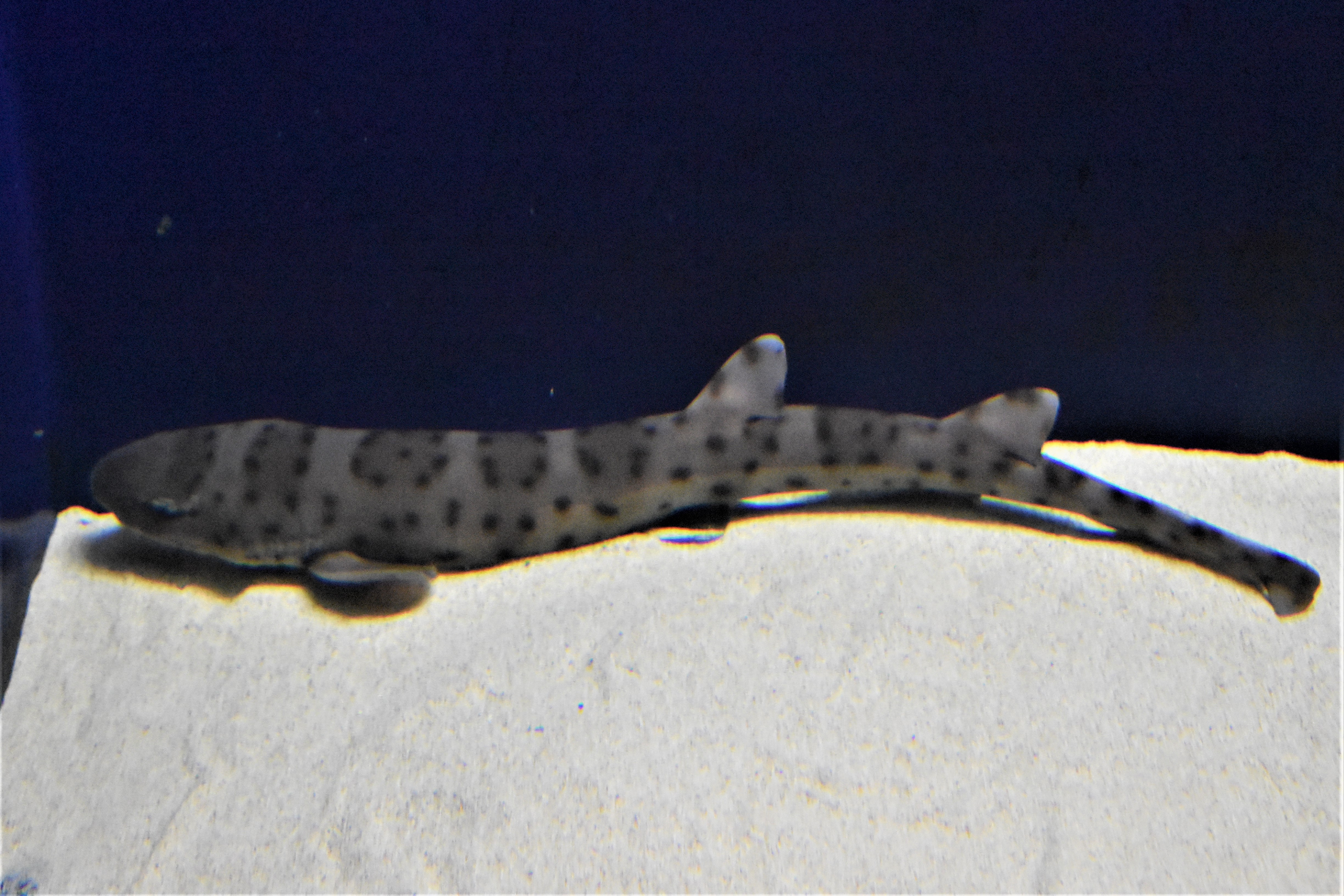

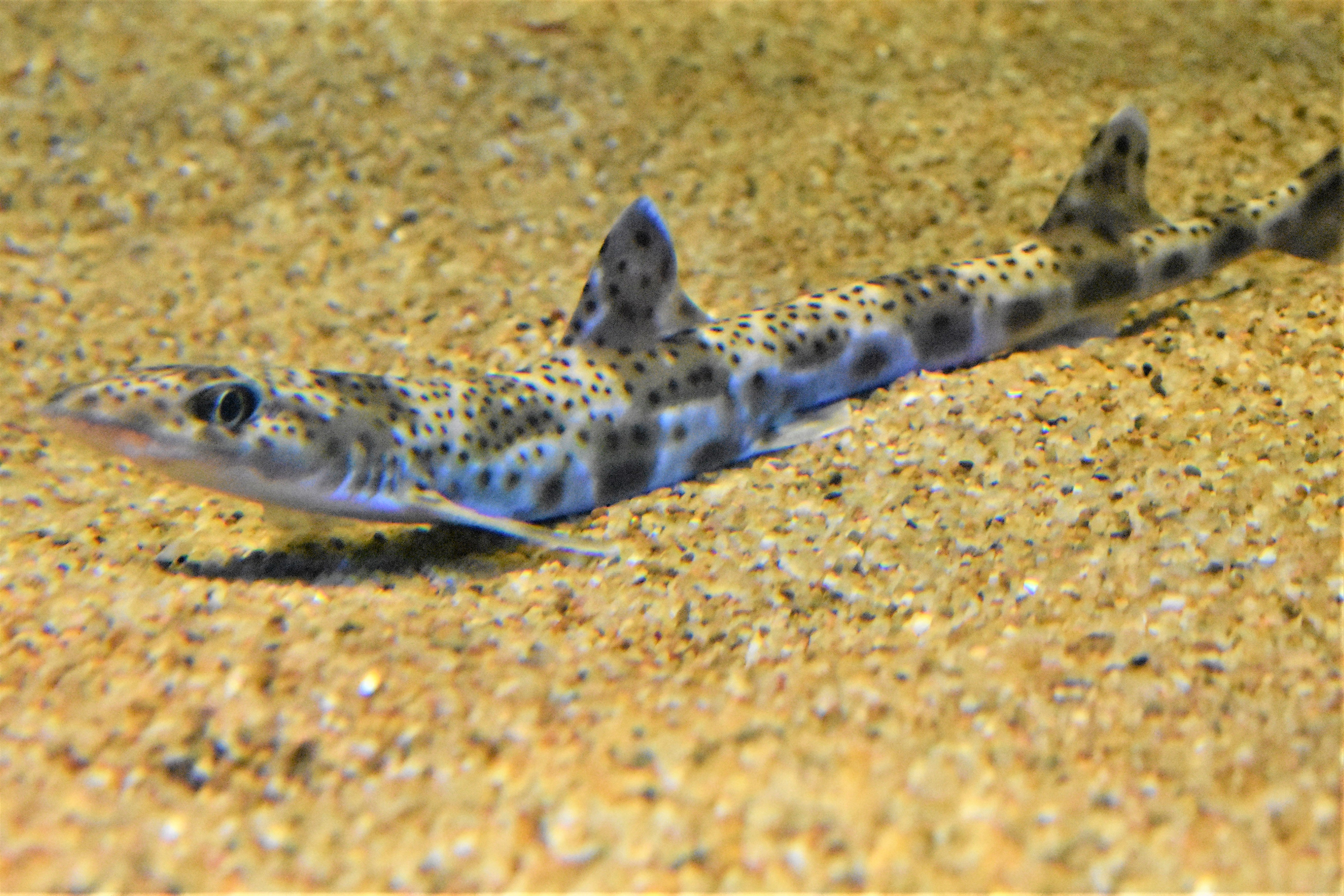
