= Marianne Nyegaard =

Danish marine biologist

- Education: Murdoch University
- Occupation: Marine biologist
- Known for: Identifying Mola tecta

Marianne Nyegaard is a Danish marine biologist who specializes in the study of ocean sunfish. She is known for identifying the ocean sunfish species Mola tecta.

== Career ==
Marianne Nyegaard has a PhD in Environmental Science in Australia at Murdoch University School of Veterinary and Life Sciences. During her time here, Nyegaard has led a team of researchers in analyzing ocean sunfish DNA in Indonesia, Australia, and New Zealand. While analyzing skin samples in 2013, she identified an undocumented species, now known as Mola tecta, or the hoodwinker sunfish. As part of her PhD research, she analyzed more than 150 DNA samples of sunfish DNA, and the genetic sequencing turned up four distinct species, one of which never before discovered. She spent the next four years working with other researchers in the Indo-pacific region to identify and describe Mola tecta. This research in identifying the species determined that they are roughly 50 cm to 2.5 m in size, and unlike other species they do not develop lumps on their bodies as they grow. Most distinctly, their back fin is separated into an upper and lower part. Nyegaard has continued to help identify specimens of M. tecta throughout the Southern Hemisphere in New Zealand, Australia, Chile, South Africa, the Santa Barbara Channel, and the west coast of Canada.

While working at the Auckland War Memorial Museum in New Zealand, Nyegaard led the effort to identify for the first time the larvae of Mola alexandrini.

== Selected publications ==
- Nyegaard, Marianne; Sawai, Etsuro; Gemmell, Neil; Gillum, Joanne; Loneragan, Neil R; Yamanoue, Yusuke; Stewart, Andrew L. Hiding in broad daylight: molecular and morphological data reveal a new ocean sunfish species (Tetraodontiformes: Molidae) that has eluded recognition. Zoological Journal of the Linnean Society. Mar2018, Vol. 182 Issue 3, p631-658.
- Nyegaard, M. and Sawai, E. Species identification of sunfish specimens (Genera Mola and Masturus, Family Molidae) from Australian and New Zealand natural history museum collections and other local sources. Data in Brief, 2018, 19, pp. 2404–2415.
- Sawai, E., Yamanoue, Y., Nyegaard, M. and Sakai, Y. Redescription of the bump-head sunfish Mola alexandrini (Ranzani 1839), senior synonym of Mola ramsayi (Giglioli 1883), with designation of a neotype for Mola mola (Linnaeus 1758) (Tetraodontiformes: Molidae). Ichthyological Research, 65 (1). pp. 142–160.
- Sawai, Etsuro; Nyegaard, Marianne. A review of giants: Examining the species identities of the world's heaviest extant bony fishes (ocean sunfishes, family Molidae) Journal of Fish Biology. June, 2022, Vol. 100 Issue 6, p1345.
