= Johann Heinrich Linck =

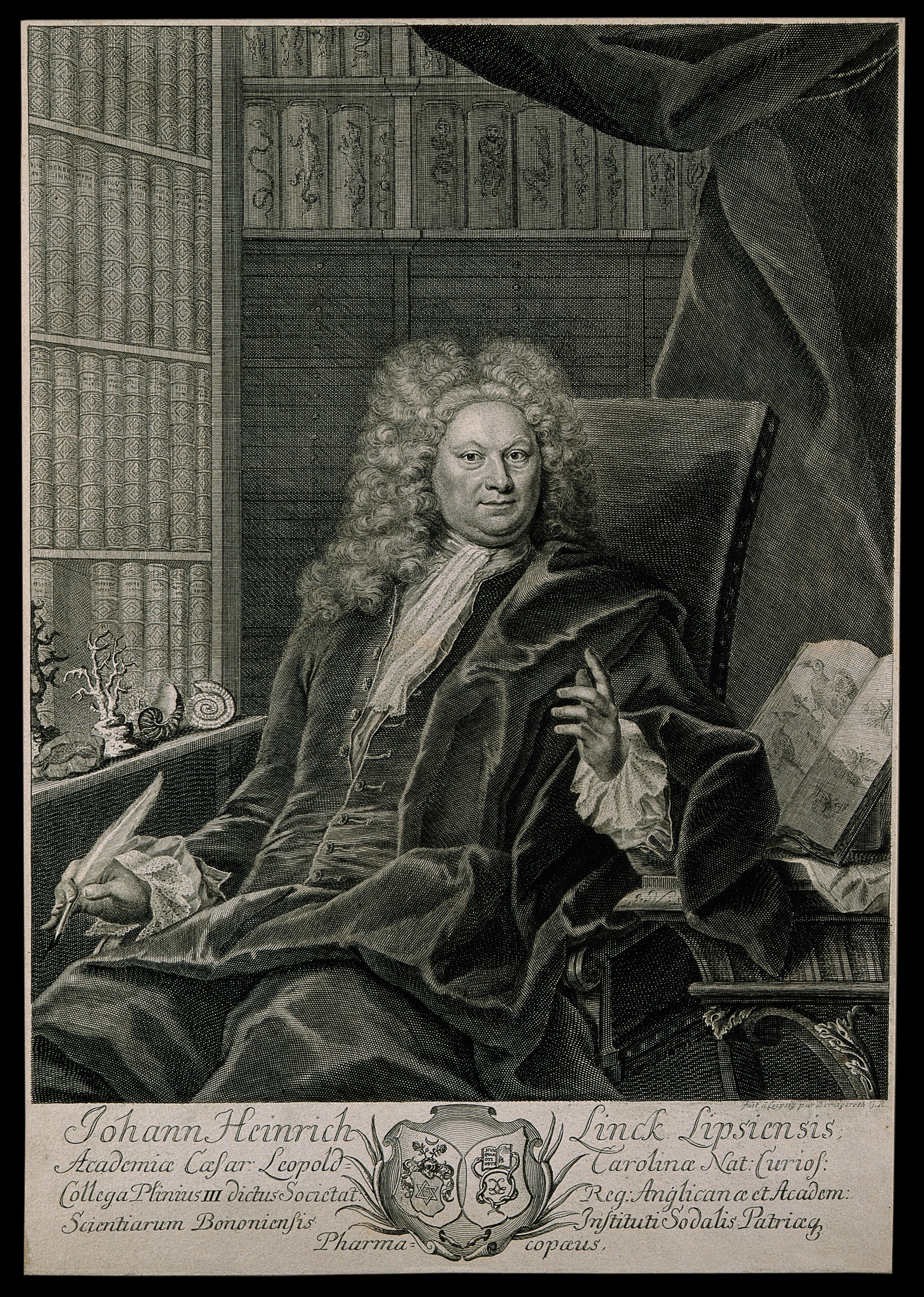
Johann Heinrich Linck, engraving by Martin Bernigeroth.

Johann Heinrich Linck the elder (17 December 1674 – 29 October 1734) was a German apothecary and naturalist. He grew the family natural history cabinet and took an interest in starfish and some fossils. His classification of starfish into two major groups based on the presence or absence of an ambulacral groove into Asteroidea and Ophiuroidea continues to be used in modern taxonomy. His son Johann Heinrich Linck the younger (1734 – 1807) also became a naturalist and documented the collections of his father.

== Life and work ==
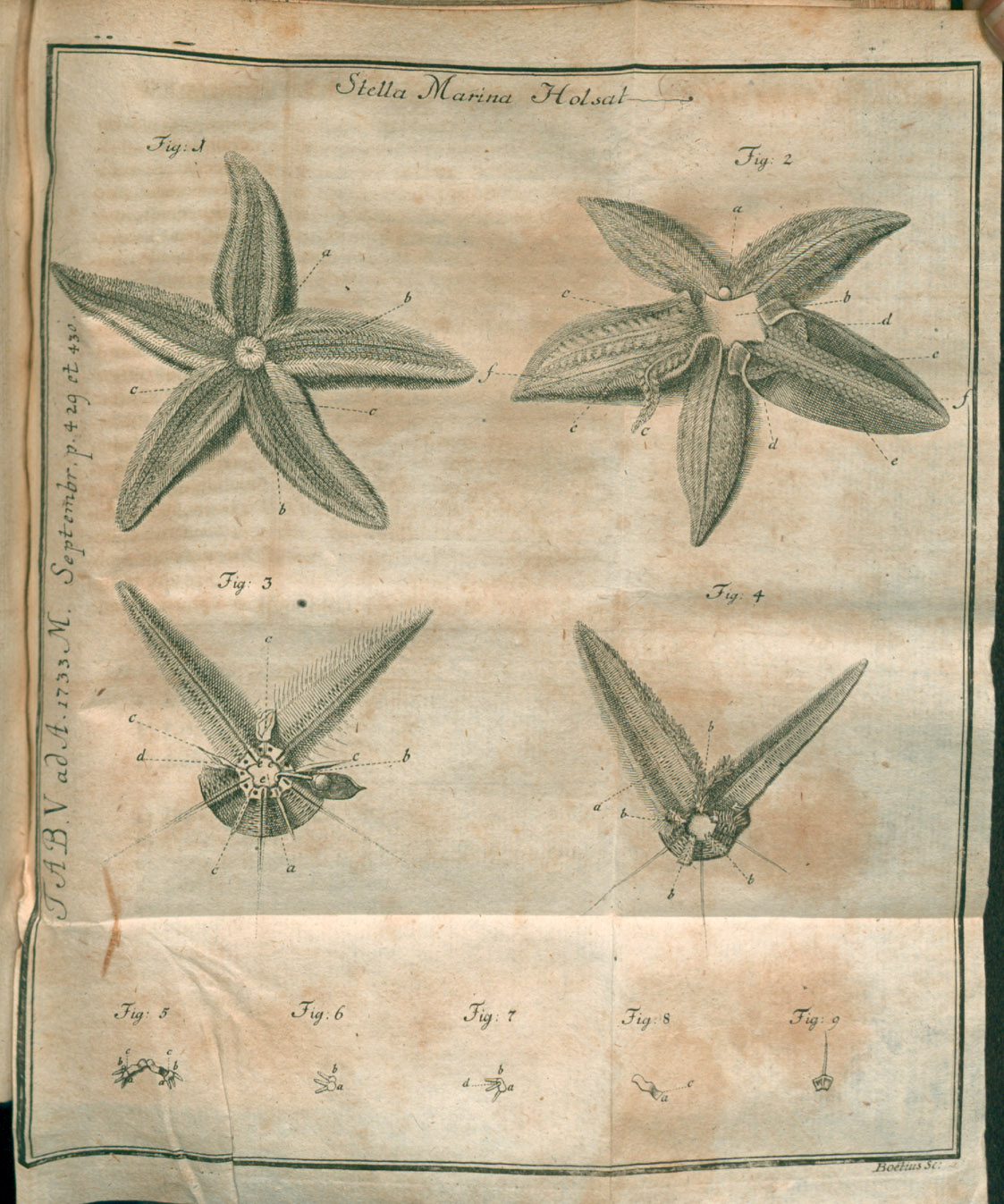
Illustration from critique of De stellis marinis liber singularis published in Acta Eruditorum, 1733

Linck was born in Leipzig where his father, Danzig-born Heinrich Linck (1638–1717), ran the family pharmacy known as "Goldenen Löwen"/"The Golden Lion". His mother Benigna was the daughter of a goldsmith. His early training was at his father's pharmacy and in 1690 he went to Copenhagen to study under the pharmacist J.G. Becker. In 1693 he made a trip to Sweden and in 1696 he visited Danzig where J. Breyn and J.T. Klein inspired his future work in natural history. He then made another tour around Europe and England in which he met Hans Sloane. From 1706 he worked at this father's pharmacy in Naumburg and from 1710 he went back to Leipzig and worked with his brother. Alongside his interest in medical and chemical studies he began to study starfish. He wrote a treatise on sea stars, De stellis marinis liber singularis (1733). In this he created a major systematic division of the asteroids and ophiuroids based on the presence or absence of the ambulacral groove. The genus Linckia of sea stars and a fossil Protorosaurus linckii are named after him. He was inducted into the Leopoldina academy in 1722 and was a member of the Royal Society of London.

Linck was married to Maria Elisabeth née Döring. His namesake son was born just a month after his death. The family pharmacy was run by Lincks wife and later by their son. The natural history cabinet was also maintained and managed by the son along with the Leipzig physician Johann Ernst Hebenstreit.

Linck's natural history cabinet was considered to be among the largest in the 18th century. Linck had a network of correspondents with whom he exchanged specimens. He examined the collections of Seba in Amsterdam, Klein in Danzig and Sloane's in London. Some remnants of the collections have survived and are now part of the Museum Waldenburg. Linck may have maintained some of the oldest-known snake specimens in alcohol.
