= Accacoelium =

Scientific classification
- Kingdom: Animalia
- Phylum: Platyhelminthes
- Class: Trematoda
- Order: Plagiorchiida
- Family: Accacoeliidae
- Genus: Accacoelium; Monticelli, 1893

Genus of flatworms

Accacoelium is a genus of flatworms belonging to the family Accacoeliidae.

The species of this genus are found in Europe and Northern America.

Species:

- Accacoelium contortum (Rudolphi, 1819) Looss, 1899
- Accacoelium pelagiae (Kölliker, 1849) Monticelli, 1893
