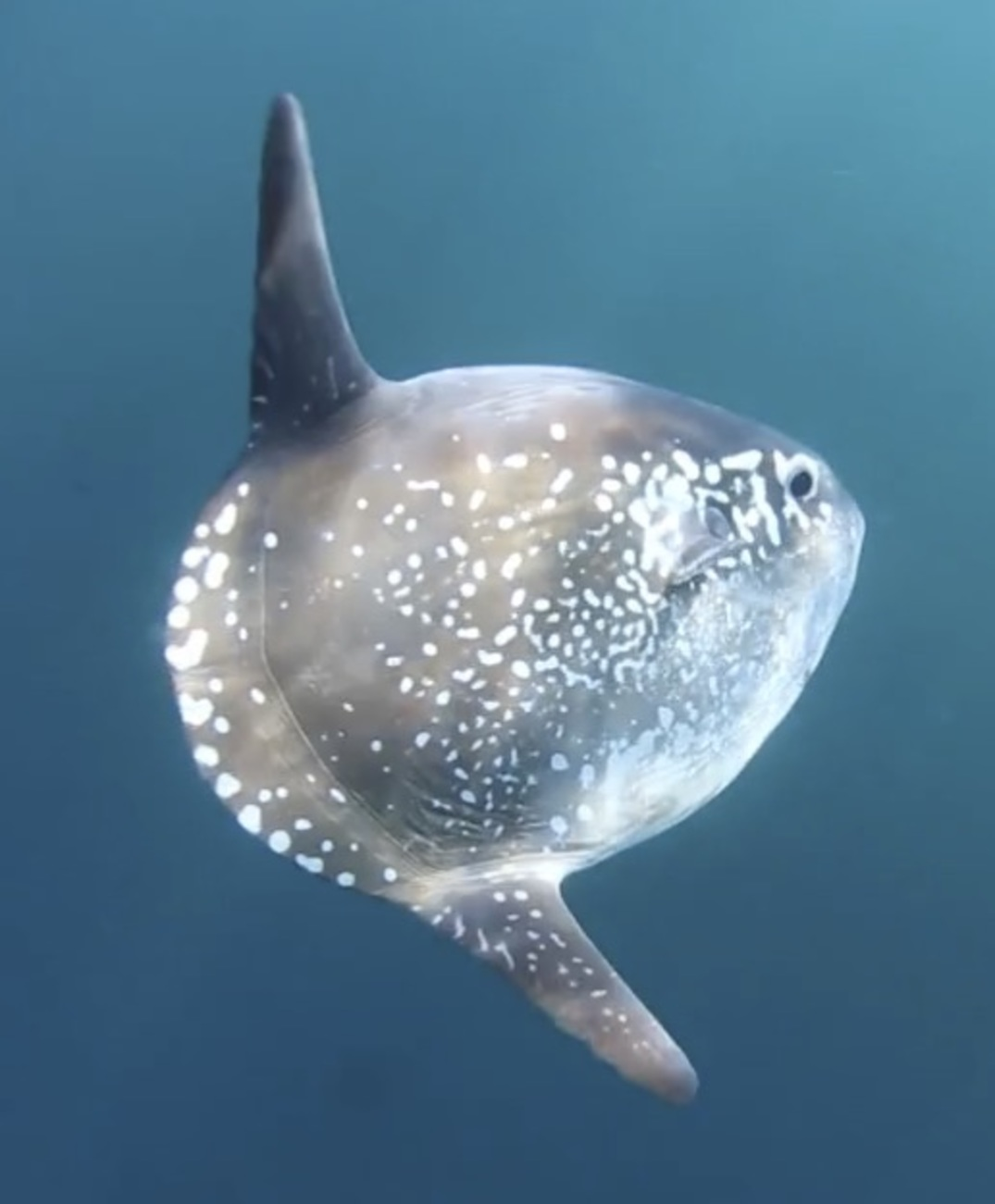

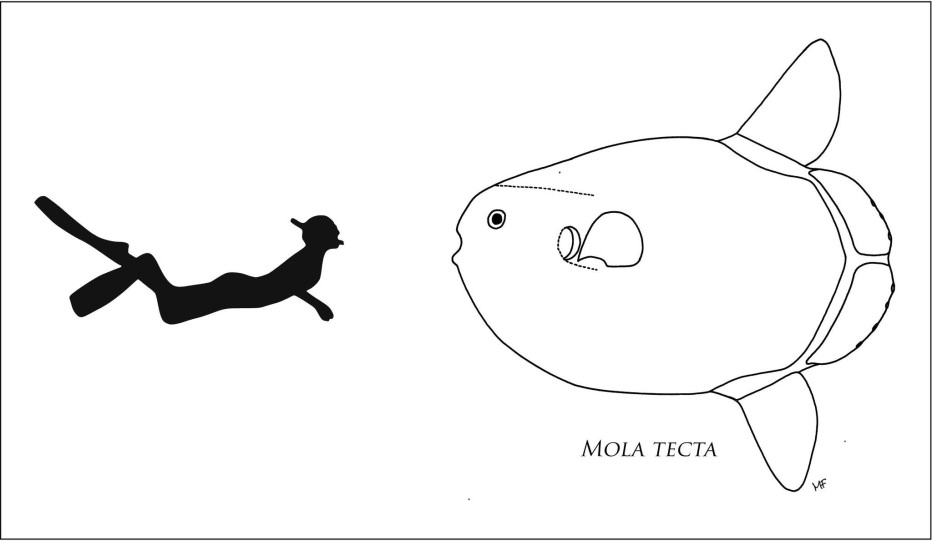

Scientific classification
- Kingdom: Animalia
- Phylum: Chordata
- Class: Actinopterygii
- Division: Teleostei
- Order: Tetraodontiformes
- Family: Molidae
- Genus: Mola
- Species: M. tecta

Binomial name
- Mola tecta Nyegaard et al., 2017

= Mola tecta =

Species of fish

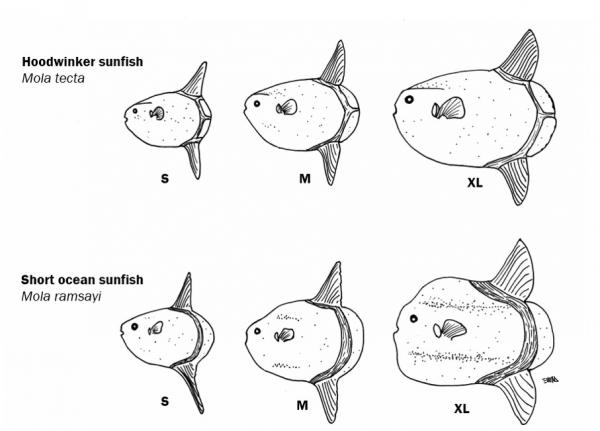
Mola tecta compared to Mola alexandrini

The hoodwinker sunfish (Mola tecta) is a large and flat bony fish located in temperate waters. The Latin word "tecta" means hidden, and has been adopted as the name due to the fish blending among other species of sunfish for a prolonged time and only being discovered recently. Belonging to the family Molidae and genus Mola, the hoodwinker sunfish is closely related to the more widely known species: The ocean sunfish (Mola mola). Discovered on a beach near Christchurch, New Zealand, in 2015, it was the first new species of sunfish to be identified in 130 years. Mola tecta are mostly discovered in the temperate region of the Southern Hemisphere in the water near Australia, New Zealand, Southern Chile and Southern Africa. It was first described by Marianne Nyegaard, a marine scientist who studied ocean sunfish for her PhD.

== Description ==
The hoodwinker sunfish is a congener of (in the same genus as) the more widely known ocean sunfish, Mola mola. Mola tecta, like other Mola species, has a flat, almost symmetrical oval shape. It can be distinguished to have a smooth body shape, lack of a head bump, a rounded snout, and a maximum length of 242 cm (about 7.9 feet). It does not have spines in its fins nor real caudal fin (tail fin). Its scales have evolved into small spines. Like cartilaginous fish, Mola tecta has counter shading, which means that it has a darker color on the dorsal side than on the ventral side. Compared to other Mola species, Mola tecta is slimmer, has a sleeker adult body shape, and lacks a protruding snout and lumps along the tail fin, which is the easiest discernable feature amongst the Mola species. It reaches up to three metres in length and can weigh up to two tonnes (2.0 long tons; 2.2 short tons). Parasites are found in all the dissected Mola tecta.^{[citation needed]}

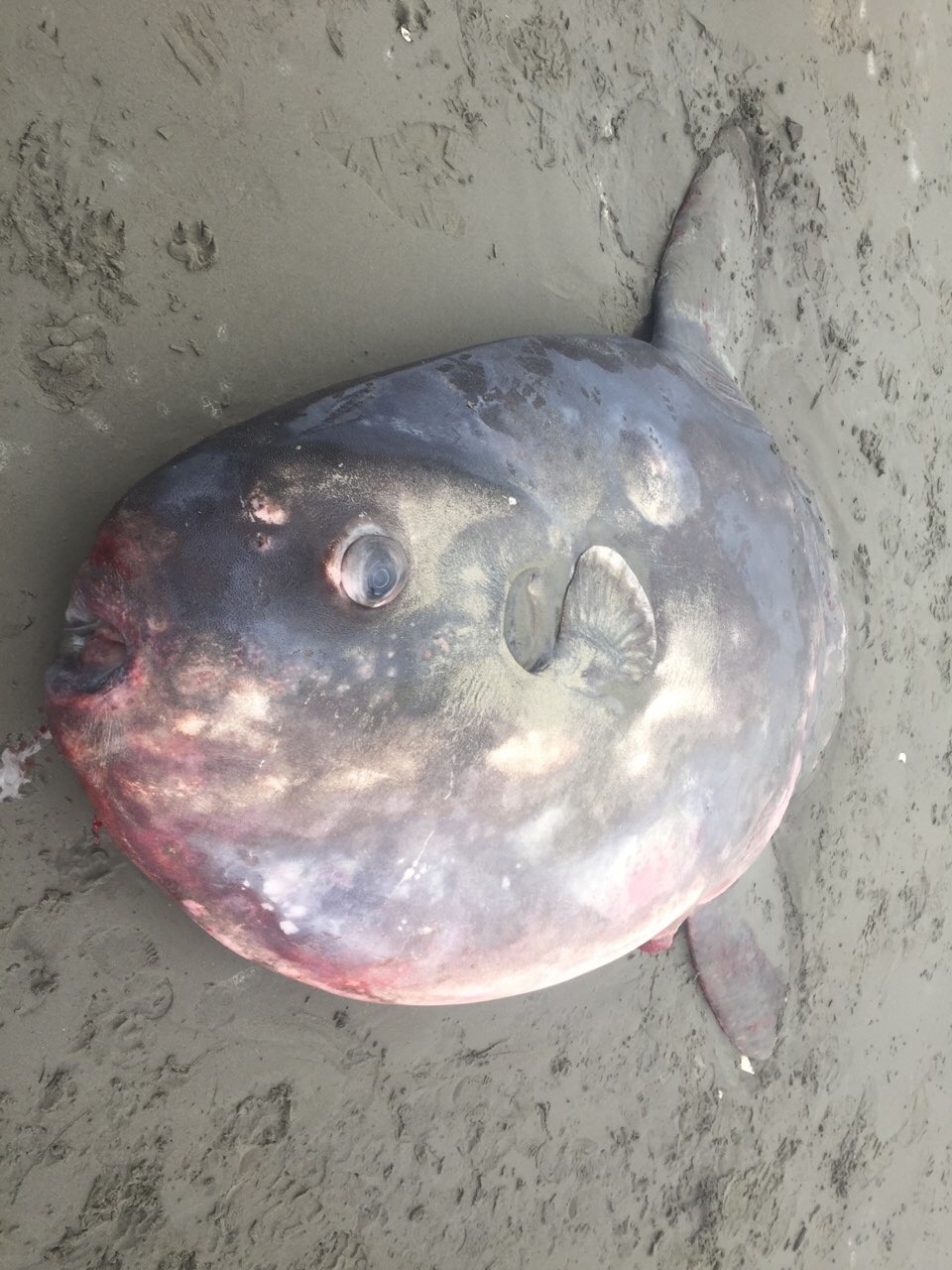
Mola tecta washed ashore in New Zealand

== History ==
There are three extant species under the genus Mola: Mola mola, Mola alexandrini, and Mola tecta.

Mola mola is the most common known ocean sunfish and was found in 1758 while Mola alexandrini (also called Mola ramsayi) was found 81 years afterward, in 1839. In comparison to its two relatives, Mola tecta was found recently in 2014. In 2004, ten years before Mola tecta was officially named, Japanese researchers found out that there was a new Mola species based on the genetic information they obtained from the Australian water. However, they were not able to obtain more information about this new Mola species and they did not know exactly what it looked like. According to Marianne Nyegaard, the first person to describe the Mola tecta, sunfish research is difficult because "finding and storing specimens for studies is a logistical nightmare for museums due to their elusive nature and enormous size".

== Life History ==
Mola tecta have very little known about their life history due to lack of research. The species begins life as a small, spined, and planktonic larva with fins. Over time, these traits are lost and hoodwinker sunfish begin to develop an oval-shaped body and distinct dorsal and pectoral fins. Hoodwinker sunfish are dioecious, externally laying eggs in the open water as a form of reproduction. Little is known to clarify aspects about reproduction such as seasonal patterns in the species, but the hoodwinker sunfish inhabits temperate regions in the Southern Hemisphere, occasionally reported to wash ashore in the Northern hemisphere and subtropical regions.

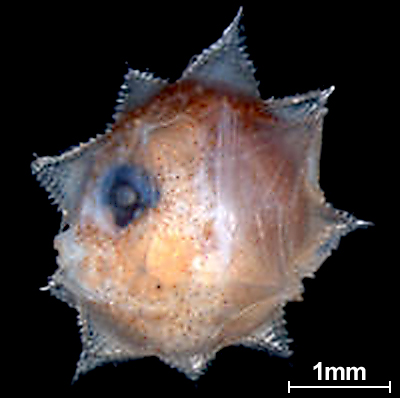
Mola mola larvae showcasing similar traits to Mola tecta larvae

== Distribution ==
Discovered on a beach near Christchurch, New Zealand, in 2014, the hoodwinker sunfish was the first new species of sunfish to be identified in 130 years. It is thought to live primarily in the Southern Hemisphere and has been found in waters off New Zealand, Australia, South Africa, and Chile. There are, however, multiple recorded cases of it being found in the Northern Hemisphere, such as one (previously thought to be a Mola mola) in Ameland in the Netherlands in 1889 and a 7-foot (2.1 m) specimen that washed up near Santa Barbara, California, in 2019. A couple more recent cases include one 2021 finding in Arcata, California, and another in the same place only 5 years later, in 2026. Mola alexandrini, another Mola species, has been found in the Southern Pacific. Mola mola, in comparison, is the most widespread species and has been found in all the major oceans except for the polar area.

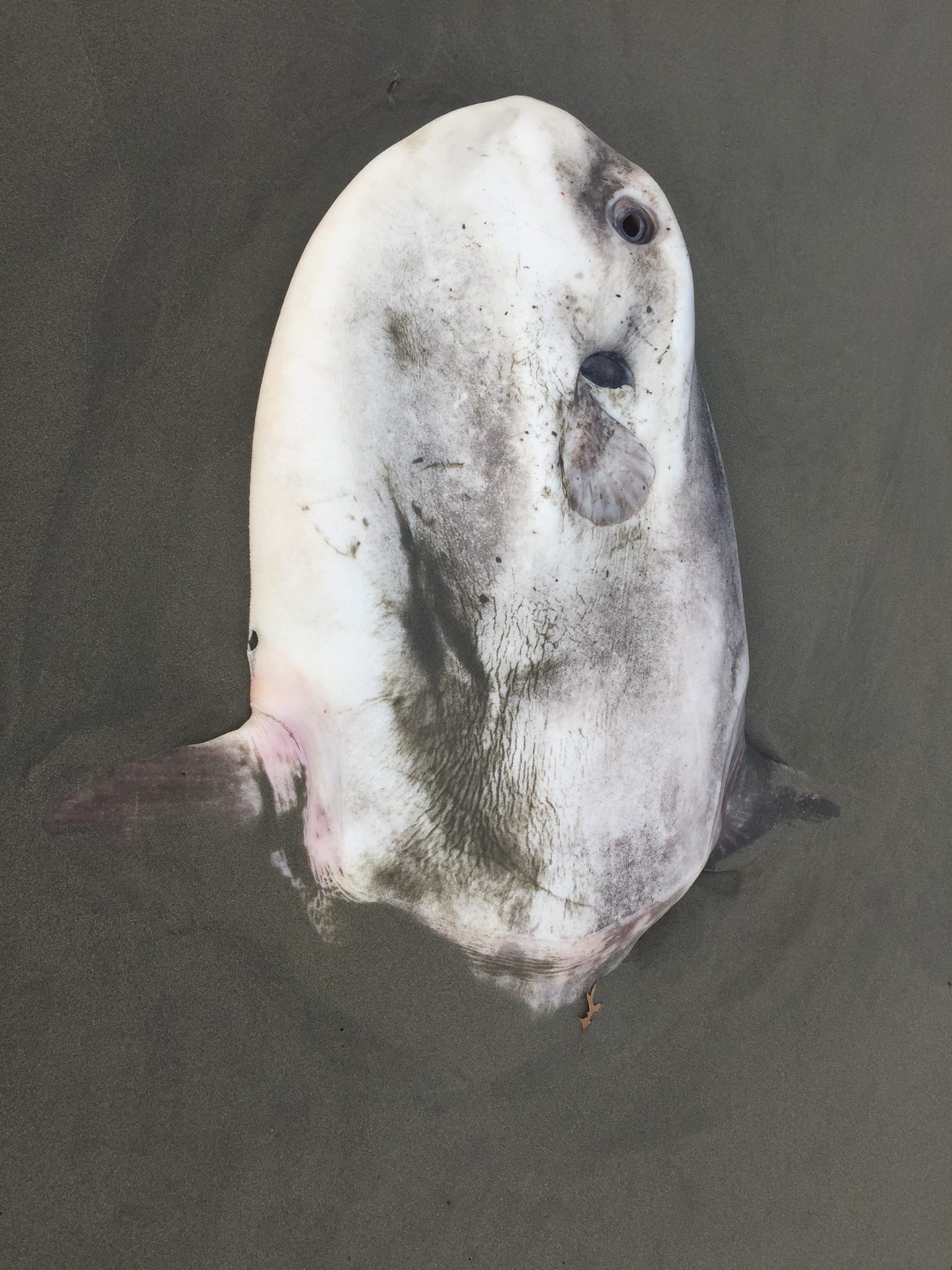
Mola tecta washed ashore in Woodend Beach Domain, NZ

Map of the Earth with gray land masses, southern hemisphere is highlighted in yellow

== Diet ==
The diet of Mola tecta is known to include salps and nektonic siphonophores as these have been found in the digestive tracts of Mola tecta. As with other sunfish species, Mola tecta are believed to primarily forage during daytime deep-sea dives.

== Conservation Status ==
As of 2025, the hoodwinker sunfish has not been evaluated by the IUCN and does not have a conservation status. Under IUCN criteria, the species is considered Not Evaluated (NE). No specific threats have been documented for Mola tecta, but the species may have similar pressures to other sunfish species such as habitat degradation, commercial fisheries, marine pollution, or ingestion of plastic debris.
