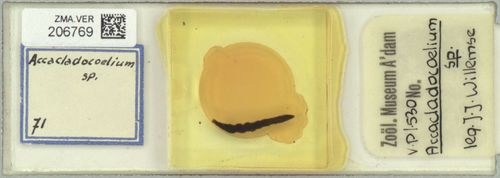
- Accacladocoelium sp.

Scientific classification
- Kingdom: Animalia
- Phylum: Platyhelminthes
- Class: Trematoda
- Order: Plagiorchiida
- Suborder: Hemiurata
- Superfamily: Hemiuroidea
- Family: Accacoeliidae; Odhner, 1911

= Accacoeliidae =

Family of worms belonging to the order Plagiorchiida

Accacoeliidae is a family of trematodes belonging to the order Plagiorchiida.

Genera:

- Accacladium Odhner, 1928
- Accacladocoelium Odhner, 1928
- Accacoelium Monticelli, 1893
- Odhnerium Yamaguti, 1934
- Orophocotyle Looss, 1902
- Paraccacladium Bray & Gibson, 1977
- Rhynchopharynx Odhner, 1928
- Tetrochetus Looss, 1912
