= Johann Heinrich Linck the Younger =

German pharmacist and naturalist (1735–1807)

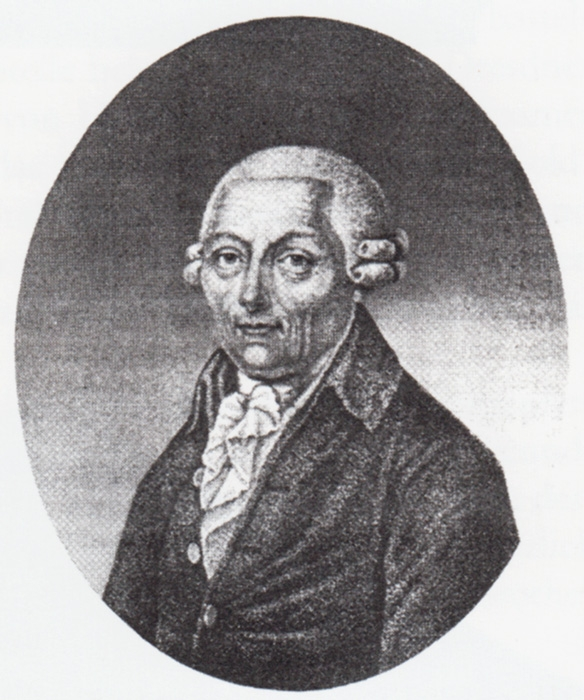

Johann Heinrich Linck the Younger (5 January 1735 – 23 May 1807) was a German pharmacist, naturalist and collector. He came to own the Linck natural history cabinet founded by his grandfather who also owned the Zum Goldenen Löwen (Lion pharmacy) in Leipzig. His father Johann Heinrich Linck (the elder) extended the collections. He documented the collections of the Linck Museum in three volumes.

== Life and work ==
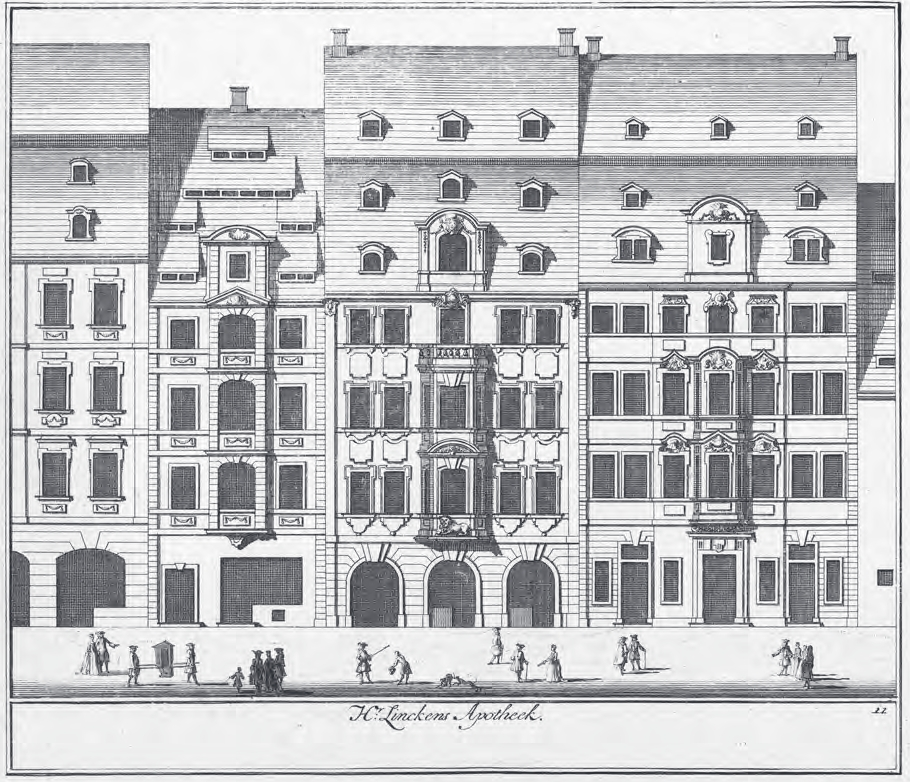
Apotheke zum Goldenen Löwen in Leipzig, c. 1710

Linck was born a month after the death of his father Johann Heinrich Linck and was raised by his mother Maria Elisabeth née Döring who also managed the family-owned pharmacy Zum Goldenen Löwen in Leipzig. Linck took over management of the pharmacy in 1757 and also began to systematically examine the collections of the natural history cabinet. He used the Linnean system to name his zoological specimens. He made use of Johann Gottschalk Waller to organize the mineral collections. There were also 1200 books apart from 800 jars of specimens in spirit and 200 boxes of fossils and minerals. In 1767 he organized the cabinet and made it publicly accessible. One of the visitors was the Saxon Elector Friedrich August III then aged seventeen. Marcus Bloch also visited the collections. In 1770 Linck was inducted into the Leopoldina Academy. Linck began to document the collections from 1783 to 1787 in three volumes of the Index Musaei Linckiani. He was inducted into the Leopoldina Academy in 1770. In 1773 he had a garden house next to the Großbosischen Garten. Linck was also a freemason and a member of the Masonic Lodge Minerva of the Three Palms.

He died on the estate of Zöbigker near Querfurt. His children predeceased him and his widow Dorothea née Schumann auctioned off most of the collections which were first purchased by August Rohde in 1818 and then in 1840 purchased by Prince Otto Victor I of Schönburg-Waldenburg. Some of the artefacts are now in the Museum at Waldenburg.
