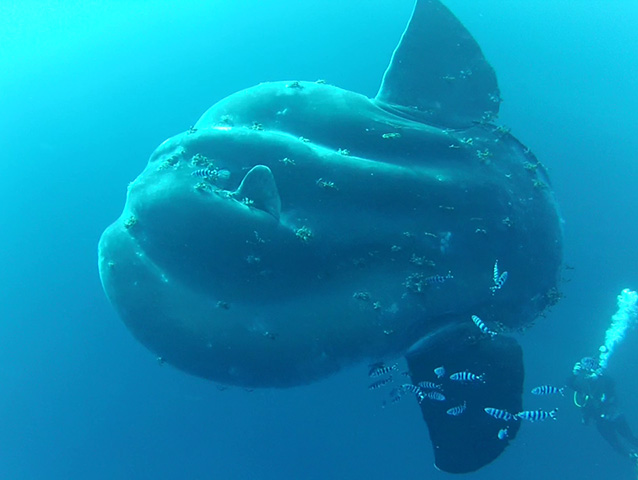
- With a small school of pilot fish

Scientific classification
- Kingdom: Animalia
- Phylum: Chordata
- Class: Actinopterygii
- Division: Teleostei
- Order: Tetraodontiformes
- Family: Molidae
- Genus: Mola
- Species: M. alexandrini

Binomial name
- Mola alexandrini (Ranzani, 1839)

Synonyms
- Orthragoriscus eurypterus Philippi 1892; Orthragoriscus ramsayi Giglioli 1839; Mola ramsayi Giglioli 1883

= Giant sunfish =

Largest extant species of bony fish

The giant sunfish or bumphead sunfish (Mola alexandrini), also known as the Ramsay's sunfish, southern sunfish, southern ocean sunfish, short sunfish or bump-head sunfish, is a fish belonging to the family Molidae. It is closely related to the more widely known Mola mola, and is found in the Southern Hemisphere. With a specimen found in the Azores in 2021 weighing 2744 kg (6049 lb), being by large the heaviest extant ray-finned fish in the world. It can be found basking on its side occasionally near the surface, which is thought to be used to re-heat itself after diving in cold water for prey, recharge its oxygen stores, and attract gulls to free itself of parasites.

== Taxonomy ==
In December 2017, it was demonstrated that Mola alexandrini may be a senior synonym of Mola ramsayi (Giglioli 1883) through both historically and newly published morphological data. In July 2020, building upon this scientific learning, the larval forms of these species were discovered for the first time and confirmed with DNA analyses by Australian and New Zealand scientific teams.

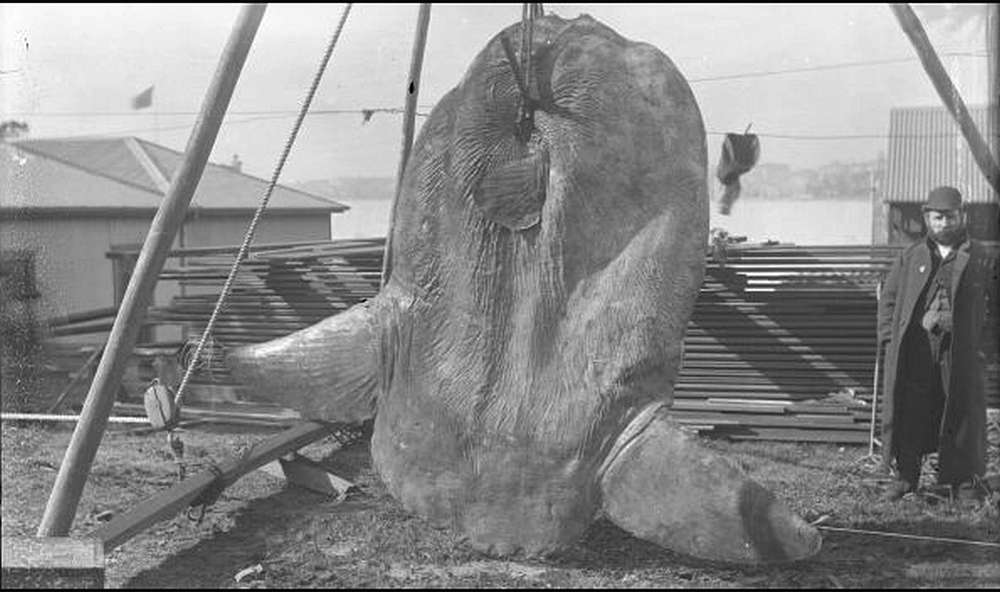
A giant sunfish caught at Darling Harbour in Sydney, Australia in 1882

The ocean sunfish are in the genus Mola, currently composed of three species: Mola mola, Mola alexandrini, Mola tecta. Also known as the southern ocean sunfish or southern sunfish, Mola alexandrini are commonly found in the epipelagic zone of the ocean, where enough light penetrates for photosynthesis to occur, although recent studies also suggest they may also be more common in deep waters.

Camillo Ranzani named Mola alexandrini in honour of his contemporary Antonio Alessandrini, a teacher of comparative anatomy and veterinary science at the University of Bologna.

== Description ==
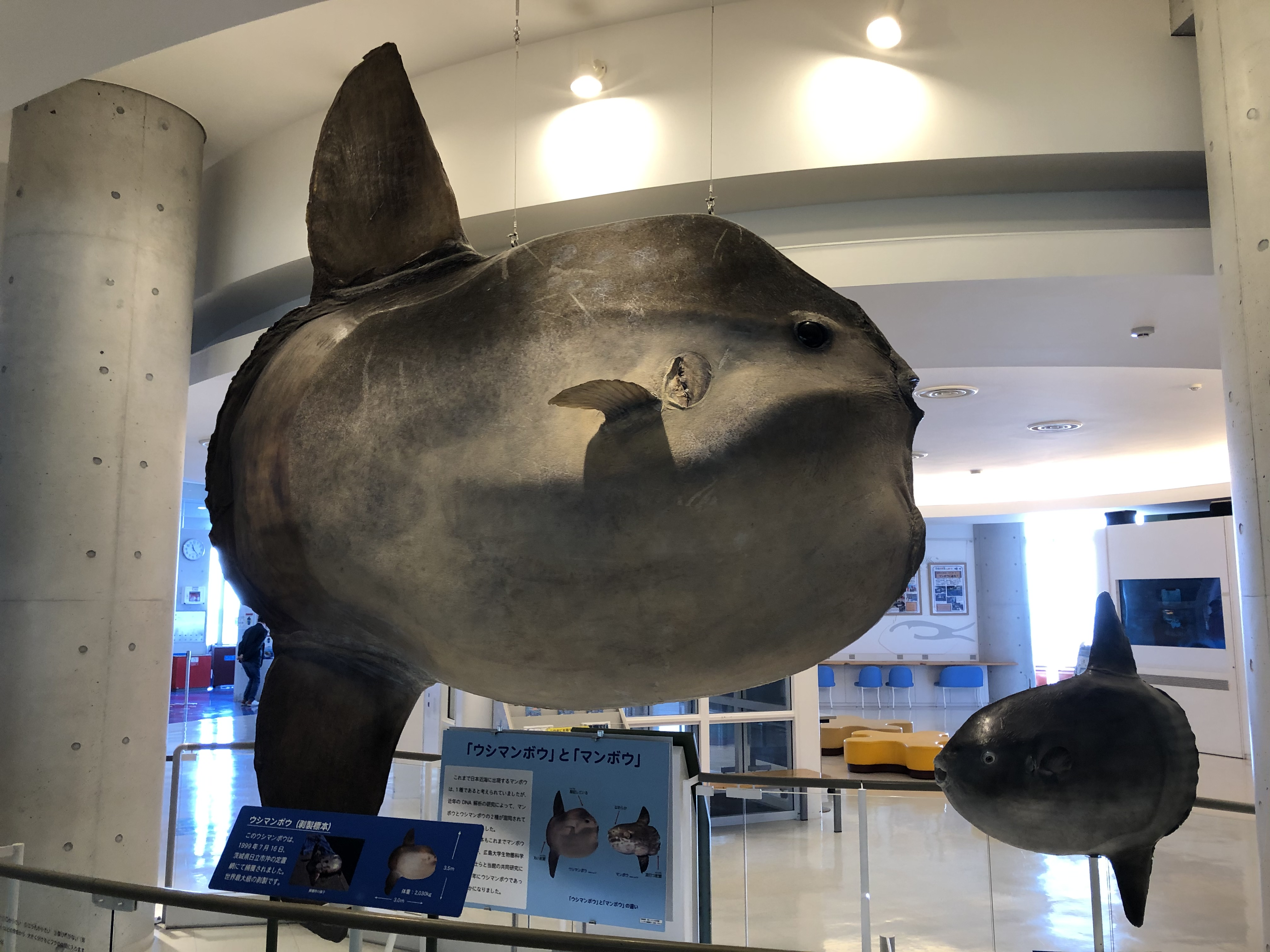
Taxidermy with a total length of 3 m (9.8 ft) and a height of 3.5 m (11 ft) in Aqua World

Mola alexandrini has a relatively small mouth, and its teeth are fused into a parrot-like beak. It can reach up to 3.3 m (11 ft) in length and 2,700 kilograms (6,000 lb) in mass, making it the heaviest bony fish.

Their bodies are flat and round, with large fins that they swish back and forth to propel themselves with as they swim horizontally. Their skin has rough denticles and a leathery texture, with brown and gray coloring with pale blotches; at death, their scales turn white. The body has a thick white subcutaneous gelatinous layer that is smooth to the touch, with a laterally compressed body covered in small rectangular scales. All mola species have no caudal bones, ribs, or pelvic fins, and have fused vertebrae, leaving only their median fins to propel themselves. Mola alexandrini can be distinguished from Mola mola by its smaller number of ossicles and lack of a vertical band of denticles at its base. In Mola, the lower jaws are intact while the upper jaws are slightly forked. On the head, the lateral lines have small, white, rounded otoconia. On the sides are small gill openings covered by a soft gill membrane and gill rakers, which are covered under a subcutaneous gelatinous layer. All fins are spineless and triangular. Pectoral fins are small and rounded, located midlaterally fitting into shallow grooves on sides of the body, and dorsal fins are located on both sides of the anal fin.

M. alexandrini can be distinguished by its unique characteristics of head bump, a chin bump, rectangular body scales, and rounded clavus. Although adult sunfish look generally similar, they are distinguishable using seven characteristics: number of clavus fin rays, number of clavus ossicles, shape of clavus margin, presence of head bump, proportion of body length compared to body height, shape of body scales, and the presence of a chin bump.

Alongside these species, there are no external differences between sexes; internally, however, the gonads differ in shape, with females having a single spherical ovary and males having a pair of elongated, rod-like testes.

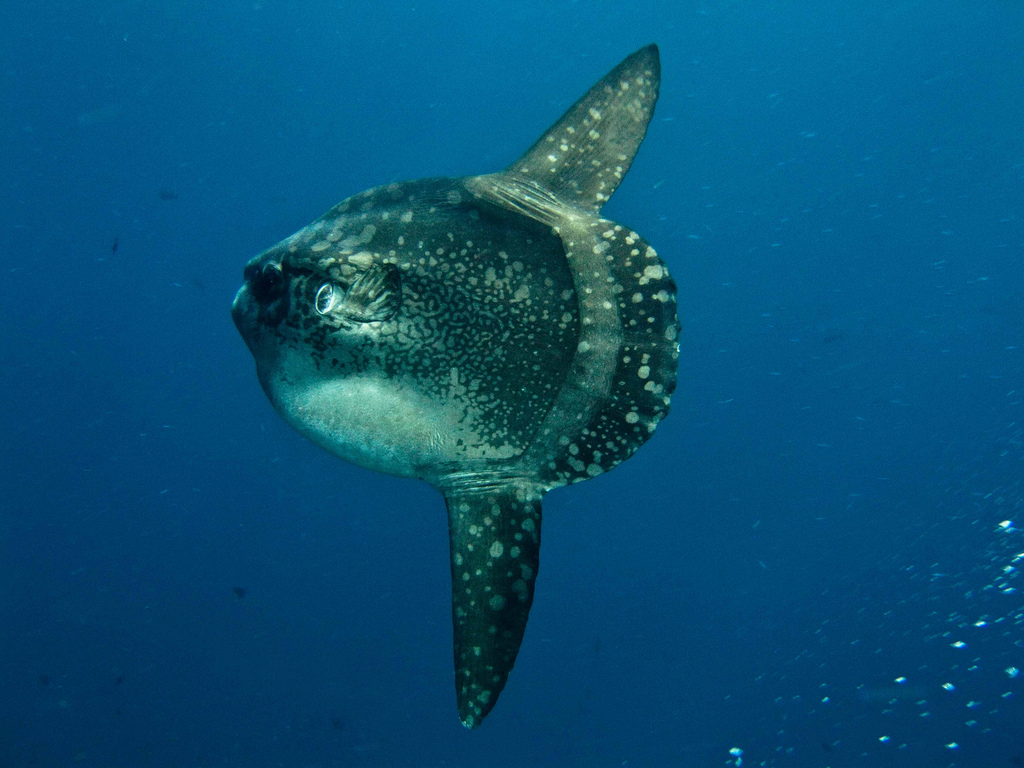
In Indonesia

In the Azores

Overall, the maximum recorded weight of M. alexandrini is 2,744 kg (6049 lb) from a 325-cm-length (10.66 ft) specimen caught off the coast of Faial Island, Azores, Portugal in late 2021. With these records, this specimen is currently regarded as the world's heaviest bony fish specimen. It exceeds by nearly half a ton (444 kg, 979 lb) the largest previously known specimen (2300 kg, 5070 lb), caught off Kamogawa, Japan in 1996.

== Distribution ==
Mola alexandrini has been found all over the globe and is widely distributed throughout the world's oceans, except for the polar regions. These species have been collected from waters off Japan, Taiwan, the Galapagos Islands, New Zealand, Australia, Turkey, Oman, and Spain. It can be found in the southwest Pacific, especially around Australia and New Zealand, and the southeast Pacific around Chile. Its range also extends to the southeast Atlantic near South Africa. During seasonal changes in climate on the Pacific side of Japan, M. alexandrini moves northwards in the summer and southwards in the winter. Seasonal migration is driven by temperature differences and productive frontal areas.

== Habitat ==
Although members of the genus Mola are found in many oceans throughout the world, this species thrives best in the open ocean of tropical and temperate seas, preferring warmer temperatures ranging from 16.8 C to 25.6 C (62.24 F to 78.08 F), averaging 19.9 C (67.82 F). Many encounters with this species are linked to the influence of ocean currents. Based on their immediate environment, sunfish have different movement patterns. During the nighttime, these species stay in the same areas, but during the daytime, they stay below the thermocline. Vertical movement patterns correlated with thermocline depth, and they differed from December to May.

== Development ==
Juvenile, in New Zealand

As M. alexandrini fry age, they undergo a number of physical changes. This includes a head bump forming from above the eyes to the front of the dorsal-fin base, and a chin bump developing from beneath the lower jaw to beneath the pectoral fins. Additionally, developing with age are lateral ridges from above the head and below the eyes to beyond the pectoral fins. Characteristics that distinguish Mola alexandrini from other species in genus Mola are clavus ossicles, a snout ossicle and a chin ossicle that develop further over time. When eggs hatch, larva specimens range between 1.42 and 1.84 mm. At 1.42 mm, they tend to display a globular shape. As they move into the pre-juvenile stage, specimens range between 5 mm to 59 mm. As they continue growing, their bodies take on the proportions of adults, including an elongated body. Once these species reach the juvenile stage, specimens are described to be as big as 305–750 mm in total length. As they mature, specimens reportedly reach 4000 mm with well-defined features, along with pigmentations of gray, olive, or black with a brown cast.

== Reproduction ==
Sunfish spawn in the outer circulation of the temperate Atlantic and Pacific Oceans, as well as in the Mediterranean Sea. The optimal time for sunfish to spawn in the wild is not known, but research has shown that spawning in fall or winter, especially during the month of September, results in bigger fish. Fertilization occurs when sperm and eggs are shed in the water. Being that sunfish are so large, a single adult female can produce 300 million eggs. Unfertilized eggs were measured at 0.42-0.45 mm in diameter.

== Lifespan ==
Just like many other fish, high mortality rates are common for eggs, larvae, pre-juveniles, and small juveniles due to predators. There have been few reports on predation of Mola species however, predation by fish are from families Scombridae, Carangidae, Coryphaenidae, Xiphiidae, and Alepisauridae. Although there is not much research on the lifespan of ocean sunfish, ocean sunfish reportedly take about 20 years to reach a length of 3 m (9.84 ft).

== Behavior ==
Sunfish swim by moving their dorsal and anal fins back and forth, both fins moving in the same direction at the same time. Adults are reported to travel mainly alone or in pairs, and sometimes in groups. Migrating from one place to another requires high tolerance and it is found that sunfish have high thermal tolerance undergoing quick and large temperature changes diving down the ocean several hundred meters. Sometimes, sunfish come up to the shallow water to recover from hypoxia from feeding below the thermocline. Like many other fish, sunfish adapt in response to the environment. During the day, sunfish tend to dive deeper into cooler water. At night sunfish tend to move closer to the surface to warmer temperatures. That is to say, their depth during a 24-hour period correlates with temperature shifts and possibly to follow prey that migrate deeper during daytime and shallower during nighttime (such as siphonophores and salps). Sunfish may dive deeper to cool their muscles or to replenish their oxygen stores.

== Diet ==
They mainly consume jellyfish, which are of low nutritional content but abundant, and they will also eat brittle stars, small fish, plankton, algae, salps, and mollusks. Sunfish also feed on ctenophores, hydrozoans, and small crustaceans. Juvenile sunfish feed in coastal areas in the coastal food web while larger sunfish dive deeper. These species are active predators hunting in dynamic frontal systems.

== Predation ==
Predators include tiger sharks and orcas, though attacks are rare. Shark predation on all species of sunfish is sporadic, suggesting that ocean sunfish are of low quality or unpleasant for tiger sharks. With smart tactics, tiger sharks can stalk and ambush their prey and are able to bite through the thick gelatinous dermis.

== Ecosystem roles ==
The importance of ocean sunfish in marine food webs is unknown. However, since ocean sunfish feed on gelatinous prey with a generalist diet, this suggests that these species play an important role in coastal food webs. If sunfish were to be removed as bycatch, it can drive localized trophic cascades with top-down control being reduced.

== Economic importance for humans ==
Sunfish have economic value in tourism industries. These fish make unpredictable appearances, but when they do appear, it is often a moment of excitement for tours and scuba divers. In locations like the Galapagos Islands and the Alboran Coast in the Mediterranean, sunfish are spotted frequently enough to have sunfish tours. Scuba diving tourism in Bali and the Nusa Penida islands has rapidly increased over the last few decades.

Only a small number of fisheries target sunfish, including those in Taiwan and Japan. In Indonesia, sunfish are released, eaten by locals, used as bait, or end up at a fish market on rare occasions.

== Conservation status ==
The conservation status of M. alexandrini has not been evaluated, unlike M. mola. Fisheries around the world catch ocean sunfish as bycatch. M. mola was listed by the International Union for the Conservation of Nature (IUCN) as "vulnerable" due to the high level of estimated bycatch in South African longline fishery with an annual estimated 340,000 annual catches. Both M. mola and M. alexandrini were listed as "high risk" bycatch species in the longline fishery off eastern Australia. Threat levels are lower than what is stated on the IUCN listing in Australian, New Zealand, and South African fisheries. Currently, the Indonesian government's Ministry of Marine Affairs and Fisheries has placed sunfish on a plan for protection.
