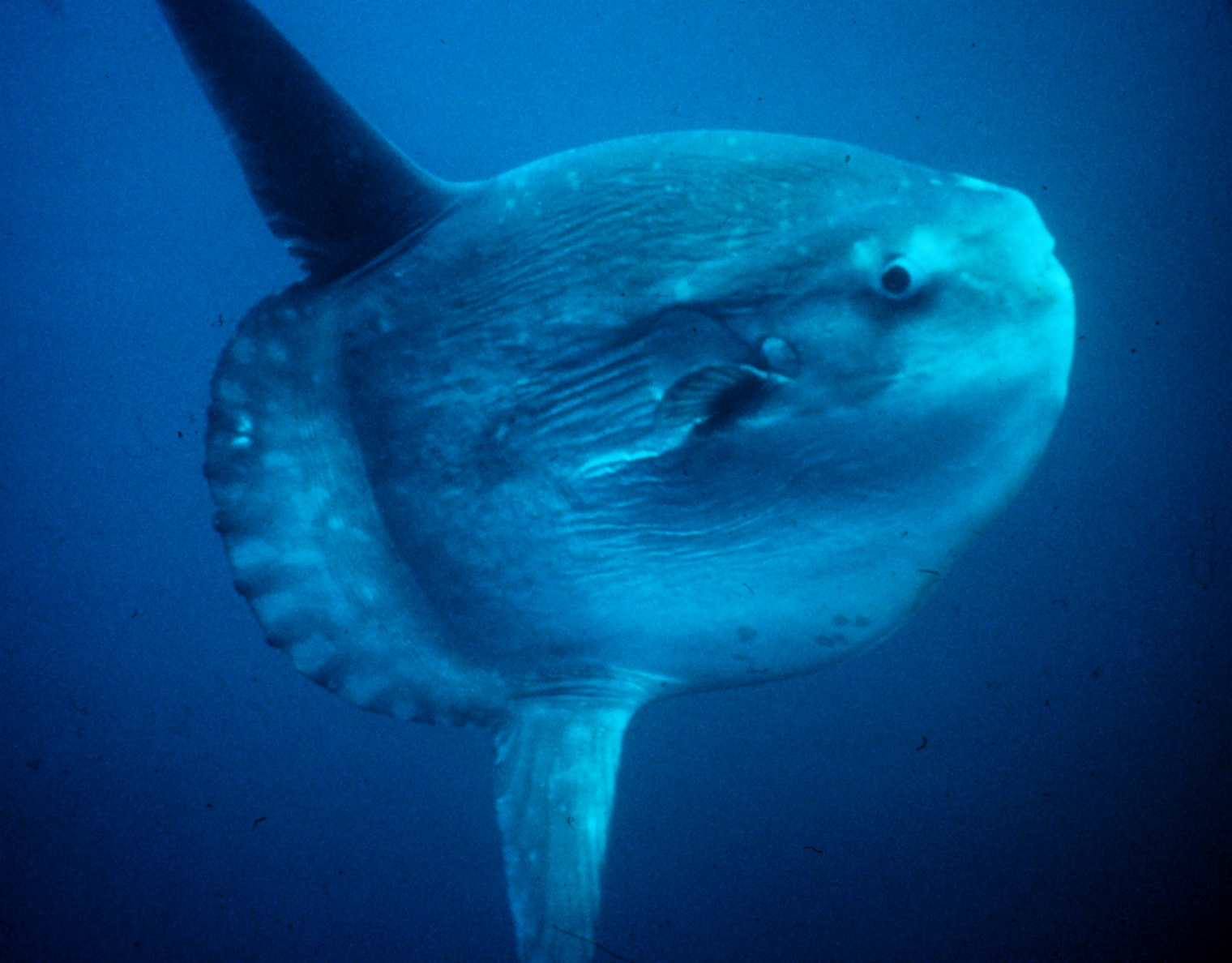

Conservation status
- Vulnerable (IUCN 3.1)

- Secure (NatureServe)

Scientific classification
- Kingdom: Animalia
- Phylum: Chordata
- Class: Actinopterygii
- Division: Teleostei
- Order: Tetraodontiformes
- Family: Molidae
- Genus: Mola
- Species: M. mola

Binomial name
- Mola mola (Linnaeus, 1758)
- IUCN distribution of the ocean sunfish Extant (resident)

Synonyms
- List: Tetraodon mola Linnaeus, 1758; Mola aculeata Kölreuter, 1766; Diodon mola Pallas, 1770; Diodon nummularis Walbaum, 1792; Mola rotunda Georges Cuvier, 1797; Orthragoriscus fasciatus Bloch & Schneider, 1801; Orthragoriscus hispidus Bloch & Schneider, 1801; Cephalus brevis Shaw, 1804; Cephalus pallasianus Shaw, 1804

= Ocean sunfish =

Ocean sunfish Temporal range: Middle Holocene–present (5,941–0 YBP)

Species of fish

The ocean sunfish (Mola mola), also known as the common mola, is one of the largest ray-finned fish in the world. It is the type species of the genus Mola, and one of five extant species in the family Molidae. It was formerly misidentified as the heaviest bony fish, which is actually a different and closely related species of sunfish, Mola alexandrini. Adults typically weigh between 247 and 1,000 kg (545 and 2,205 lb). It is native to tropical and temperate waters around the world. It resembles a fish head without a tail, and its main body is flattened laterally. Sunfish can be as tall as they are long, between 175 and 180 centimetres (5.74 and 5.91 ft), when their dorsal and ventral fins are extended.

Many areas of sunfish biology remain poorly understood, including mating practices and spawning locations, early life stages, movement and migration patterns, population structure and status, diet and trophic ecology, and post-release survival rates. Various research efforts are underway, including aerial surveys of populations, satellite surveillance using pop-off satellite tags, genetic analysis of tissue samples, and collection of amateur sighting data.

Adult sunfish are vulnerable to few natural predators, but sea lions, orcas, and sharks will consume them. Sunfish are considered a delicacy in some parts of the world, including Japan, Korea, and Taiwan. In the European Union, regulations ban the sale of fish and fishery products derived from the family Molidae. Sunfish are frequently caught in gillnets.

== Naming ==
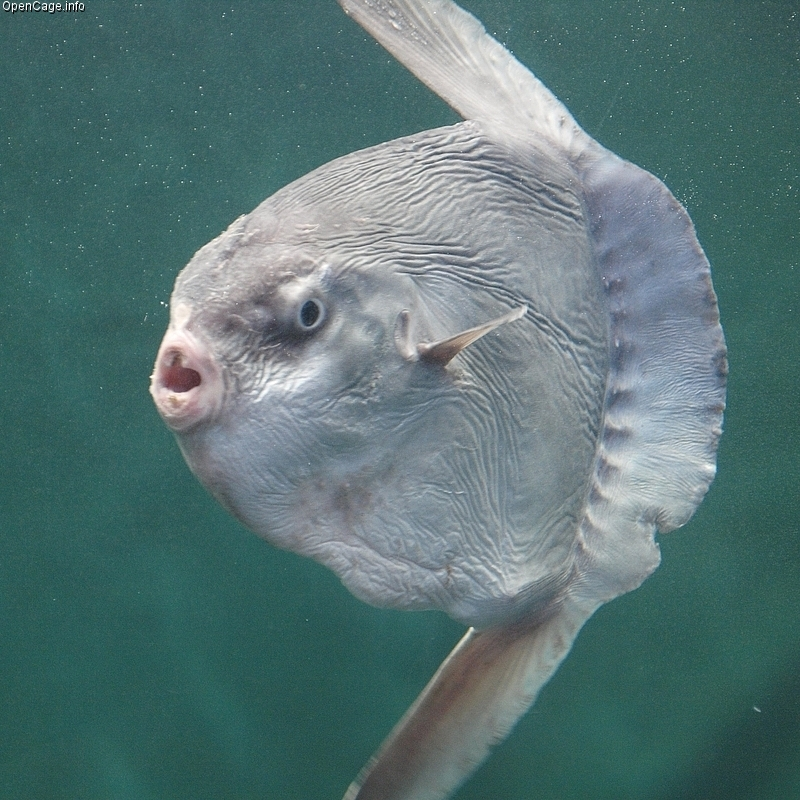
The ocean sunfish is one of the largest bony fish. It has a flattened body and is as tall as it is long (about 6 ft.).

Its common English name, sunfish, refers to the animal's habit of sunbathing at the surface of the sea. Its common names in Catalan, Dutch, French, German, Greek, Hungarian, Italian, Norwegian, Portuguese, Russian, Spanish, and Ukrainian (peix lluna, maanvis, Poisson lune, Mondfisch, φεγγαρόψαρο, holdhal, Pesce luna, månefisk, peixe lua, рыба-луна, pez luna, and риба-місяць, respectively) mean "moon fish", in reference to its rounded shape. In German, the fish is also known as Schwimmender Kopf, or "swimming head". In Polish, it is named samogłów, meaning "head alone" or "only head", because it has no true tail. In Swedish and Danish it is known as klumpfisk, in Dutch klompvis, in Finnish möhkäkala, all of which mean "lump fish". The Chinese translation of its academic name is 翻車魚; fān chē yú, meaning "overturned car fish". Many of the sunfish's various names allude to its flattened shape.

=== Taxonomy ===
French polymath Guillaume Rondelet wrote about the ocean sunfish in his 1554 work de Piscibus, using the term Orthagoriscus, "sucking pig", for the likeness of its body and mouth. It was originally classified in the pufferfish family as Tetraodon mola, its epithet mola is Latin for "millstone", which the fish resembles because of its gray color, rough texture, and rounded body. It is now placed in its own genus Mola and family name Molidae as the type species with two other species: Mola tecta and M. alexandrini (previously known as Mola ramsayi). Extinct relatives of Mola mola lived in the Oligocene and Miocene epochs. However, the earliest known fossil remains of Mola mola itself were found in archaeological middens dating to the Holocene epoch.

The common name "sunfish" without qualifier is used to describe the marine family Molidae and the freshwater sunfish in the family Centrarchidae, which is unrelated to Molidae. On the other hand, the name "ocean sunfish" and "mola" refer only to the family Molidae.

== Description ==
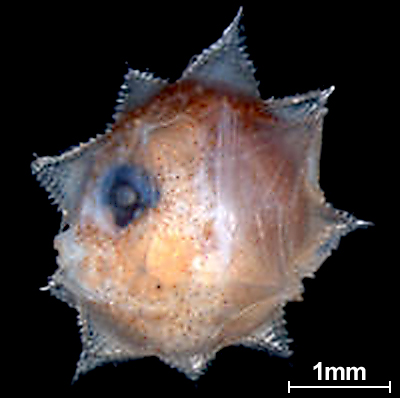
A sunfish fry, which still possesses spines that will later disappear

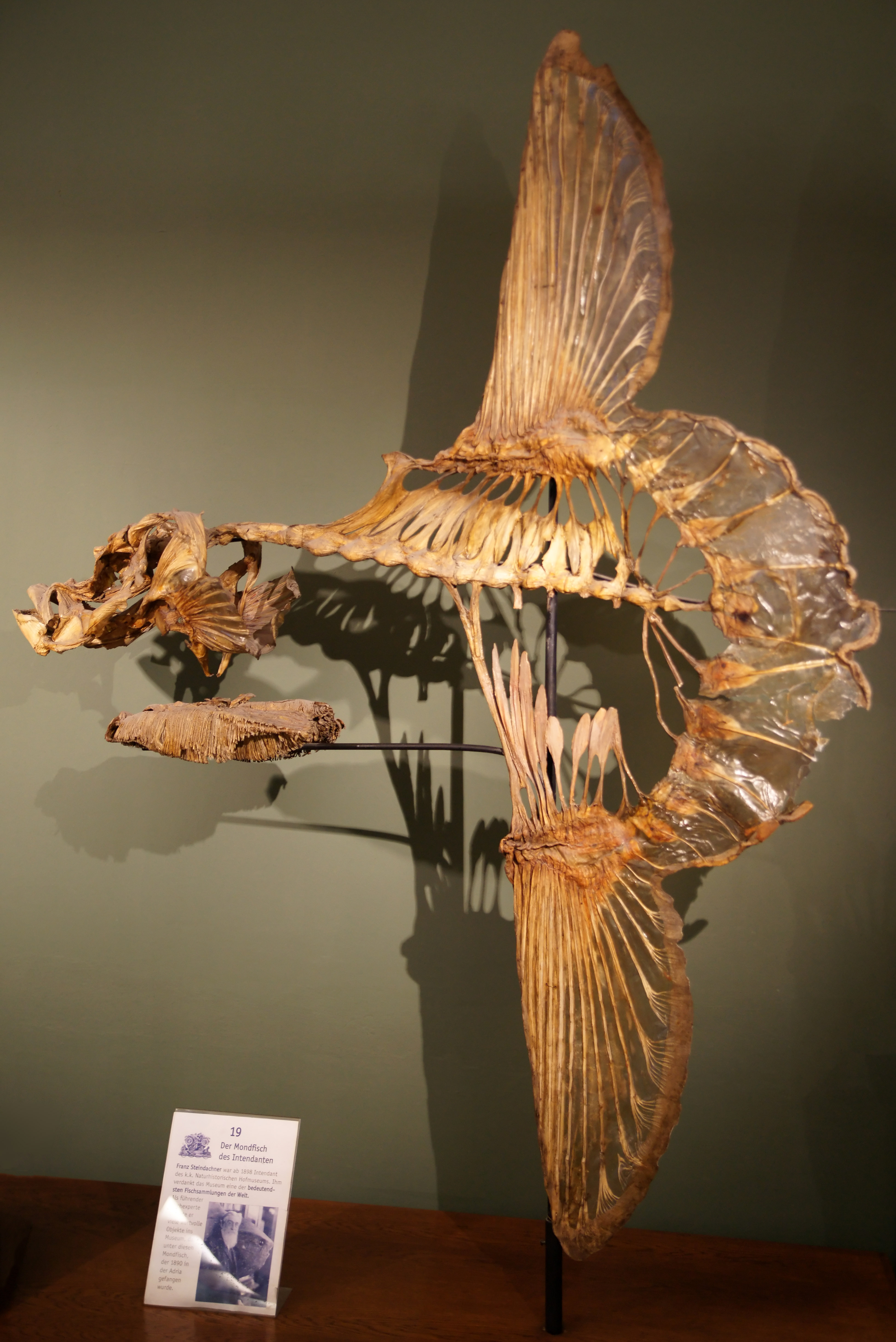
A skeleton, showing the structure of the fins

The ocean sunfish shares many traits common to members in the order Tetraodontiformes, including pufferfish, porcupinefish, and filefish, like having a beak formed from four fused teeth; sunfish fry resemble spiky pufferfish more than they resemble adult molas.

The caudal fin of the ocean sunfish is replaced by a rounded clavus, creating the body's distinct truncated shape. The body is flattened laterally, giving it a long oval shape when seen head-on. The pectoral fins are small and fan-shaped, while the dorsal fin and the anal fin are lengthened, often making the fish as tall as it is long. Specimens up to 3.3 m (10 ft 10 in) in height have been recorded.

The mature ocean sunfish has an average length of 1.8 m (5 ft 11 in) and a fin-to-fin length of 2.5 m (8 ft 2 in). The weight of mature specimens can range from 247 to 1,000 kg (545 to 2,205 lb), but even larger individuals are not unheard of. The maximum size recorded, a specimen washed ashore in New Zealand in 2006, was 3.3 m (10 ft 10 in) in length, weighing 2,300 kg (5,100 lb).

The spinal column of M. mola contains fewer vertebrae and is shorter in relation to the body than that of any other fish. Although the sunfish descended from bony ancestors, its skeleton contains largely cartilaginous tissues, which are lighter than bone, allowing it to grow to sizes impractical for other bony fishes. Its teeth are fused into a beak-like structure, which prevents them from being able to fully close their mouths, while also having pharyngeal teeth located in the throat.

The axial musculature is completely lost during development. In addition, they are missing a swim bladder. Instead, they get their buoyancy from a stiff and gelatinous layer under the skin, which consists of about 90% water and a meshwork of collagen and elastin, acting like an exoskeleton, with a greasy texture that may indicate it also contains lipids. The layer, which is horizontally separated by a septum, makes up a larger part of the animal's total mass, the bigger the individual is. Some sources indicate the internal organs contain a concentrated neurotoxin, tetrodotoxin, like the organs of other poisonous tetraodontiformes, while others dispute this claim.

=== Fins ===
In the course of its evolution, the caudal fin (tail) of the sunfish disappeared, to be replaced by a lumpy pseudotail, the clavus. This structure is formed by the convergence of the dorsal and anal fins, and is used by the fish as a rudder. The smooth-denticled clavus retains 11–14 fin rays and terminates in a number of rounded ossicles.

Ocean sunfish often swim near the surface, and their protruding dorsal fins are sometimes mistaken for those of sharks. However, the two can be distinguished by the motion of the fin. Unlike most fish, the sunfish swings its dorsal fin and anal fin in a characteristic sculling motion.

=== Skin ===
Adult sunfish range from brown to silvery-grey or white, with a variety of region-specific mottled skin patterns. Coloration is often darker on the dorsal surface, fading to a lighter shade ventrally as a form of countershading camouflage. M. mola also exhibits the ability to vary skin coloration from light to dark, especially when under attack. The skin, which contains large amounts of reticulated collagen, can be up to 7.3 cm (2 3/4 in) thick on the ventral surface, and is covered by denticles and a layer of mucus instead of scales. The skin on the clavus is smoother than that on the body, where it can be as rough as sandpaper.

More than 40 species of parasites may reside on the skin and internally, motivating the fish to seek relief in a number of ways. One of the most frequent ocean sunfish parasites is the flatworm Accacoelium contortum.

In temperate regions, drifting kelp fields harbor cleaner wrasses and other fish that remove parasites from the skin of visiting sunfish. In the tropics, M. mola solicits cleaning help from reef fishes. By basking on its side at the surface, the sunfish also allows seabirds to feed on parasites from its skin, while smaller parasite-eating fish feed on the underside. Sunfish have been reported to breach, clearing the surface by approximately 3 m (10 ft), in an apparent effort to dislodge embedded parasites.

== Distribution and habitat ==
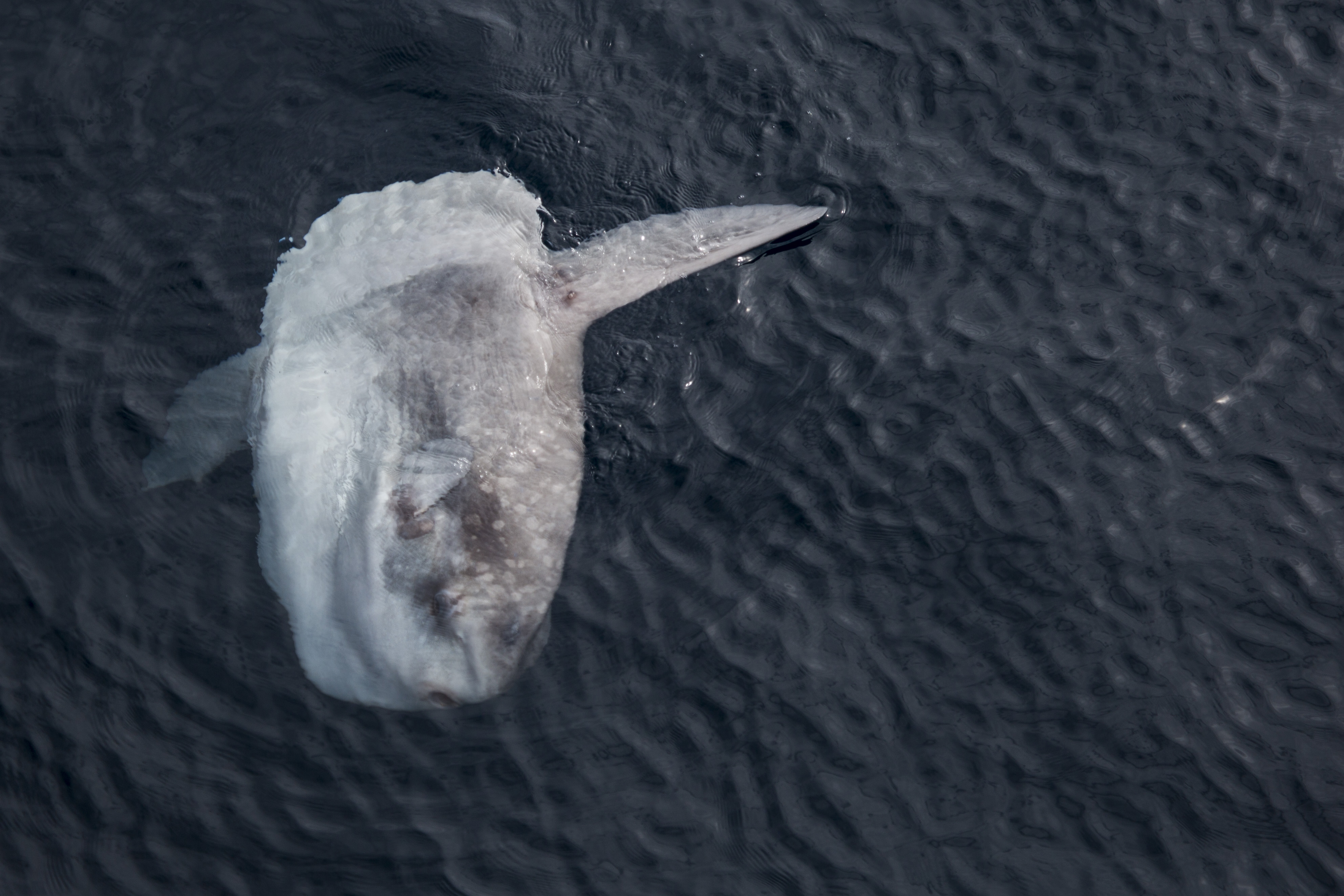
Characteristic horizontal basking behavior

Ocean sunfish are native to the temperate and tropical waters of every ocean in the world. Mola genotypes appear to vary widely between the Atlantic and Pacific, but genetic differences between individuals in the Northern and Southern hemispheres are minimal.

Although early research suggested sunfish moved around mainly by drifting with ocean currents (which has resulted in the sunfish sometimes being characterized as a megaplankton), individuals have been recorded swimming 26 km (16 mi) in a day at a cruising speed of 3.2 km/h (1.7 kn). Contrary to the perception that the fish spend much of their time basking at the surface, M. mola adults actually spend a large portion of their lives actively hunting at depths greater than 200 m (660 ft), occupying both the epipelagic and mesopelagic zones. Sunfish are most often found in water warmer than 10 °C (50 °F); prolonged periods spent in water at temperatures of 12 °C (54 °F) or lower can lead to disorientation and eventual death. Surface basking behavior, in which a sunfish swims on its side, presenting its largest profile to the sun, may be a method of "thermally recharging" following dives into deeper, colder water in order to feed. Sightings of the fish in colder waters outside of its usual habitat, such as those southwest of England, may be evidence of increasing marine temperatures.

Sunfish are typically observed in solitary environments, though infrequently they may be encountered in pairs.

== Feeding ==
The diet of the ocean sunfish was formerly thought to consist primarily of various jellyfish and other gelatinous zooplankton, such as ctenophores, salps, and medusae. However, genetic analysis reveals that sunfish are actually generalist predators that also consume mostly small fish (such as flounder and salema), fish (eel) larvae, squid, other molluscs, planktonic crustaceans, echinoderms, and other soft-bodied invertebrates, with jellyfish and salps making up only around 15% of the diet. Occasionally, they will ingest eel grass. This range of food items indicates that the sunfish feeds at many levels, from the surface to deep water, and occasionally down to the seafloor in some areas.

== Life cycle ==
Ocean sunfish may live up to ten years in captivity, but their lifespan in a natural habitat has not yet been determined. However, estimates of their lifespan in a natural habitat place their life expectancy at around 2 to 23 years for females and 1-16 years for males. Their growth rate also remains undetermined. However, a young specimen at the Monterey Bay Aquarium increased in weight from 26 to 399 kg (57 to 880 lb) and reached a height of nearly 1.8 m (5 ft 11 in) in 15 months.

The sheer size and thick skin of an adult of the species deters many smaller predators, but younger fish are vulnerable to predation by bluefin tuna and mahi mahi. Adults are consumed by orca, sharks and sea lions.

The mating practices of the ocean sunfish are poorly understood, but spawning areas have been suggested in the North Atlantic, South Atlantic, North Pacific, South Pacific, and Indian oceans. Females of the species can produce more eggs than any other known vertebrate, up to 300 million at a time. Sunfish eggs are released into the water and externally fertilized by sperm.

Newly hatched sunfish larvae are only 2.5 mm (3/32 in) long and weigh less than one gram. They develop into fry that resemble miniature pufferfish, their close relatives. Sunfish fry do not have the large pectoral fins and tail fin of their adult forms, but they have body spines uncharacteristic of adult sunfish, which disappear as they grow. Young sunfish school for protection, but this behavior is abandoned as they grow. The fry that survive can grow up to 60 million times their original weight before reaching adult proportions, arguably the most extreme size growth of any vertebrate animal.

== Genome ==
In 2016, researchers from China National Genebank and A*STAR Singapore, including Nobel laureate Sydney Brenner, sequenced the genome of the ocean sunfish and discovered several genes which might explain its fast growth rate and large body size. As member of the order Tetraodontiformes, like fugu, the sunfish has quite a compact genome, at 730 Mb in size. Analysis from this data suggests that sunfish and pufferfishes diverged approximately 68 million years ago, which corroborates the results of other recent studies based on smaller datasets.

== Conservation ==
The ocean sunfish is listed as vulnerable by the IUCN, with its population decreasing. Its main threat is the use of drift gillnets.

== Human interaction ==
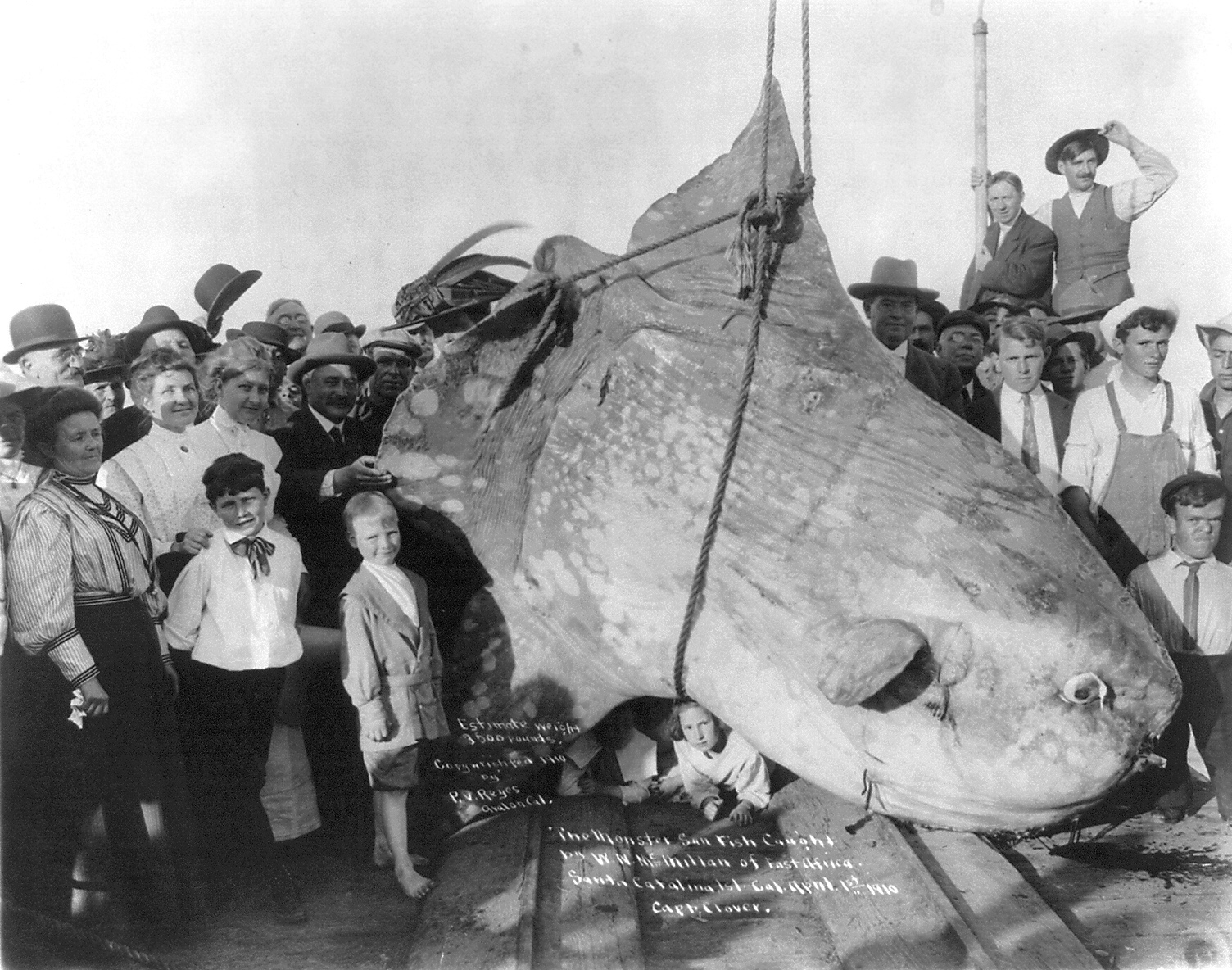
A sunfish caught in 1910, with an estimated weight of 1,600 kg (3,500 lb)

Despite their size, ocean sunfish are docile and pose no threat to human divers. Injuries from sunfish are rare, although a slight danger exists from large sunfish leaping out of the water onto boats. In 2005, a 1 metre (3 feet 3 inches)-long sunfish landed on a 4-year-old boy when the fish leaped onto the boy's family's boat off the coast of Pembrokeshire, Wales, causing slight injuries. Areas where they are commonly found are popular destinations for sport dives, and sunfish at some locations have reportedly become familiar with divers. They are more of a problem to boaters than to swimmers, as they can pose a hazard to watercraft due to their large size and weight. Collisions with sunfish are common in some parts of the world and can cause damage to the hull of a boat, or to the propellers of larger ships, as well as to the fish.

The flesh of the ocean sunfish is considered a delicacy in some regions, the largest markets being Taiwan and Japan. All parts of the sunfish are used in cuisine, from the fins to the internal organs. Some parts are used in some areas of traditional medicine. Fishery products derived from sunfish are forbidden in the European Union according to Regulation (EC) No 853/2004 of the European Parliament and of the Council, as they contain toxins that are harmful to human health.

Sunfish are accidentally but frequently caught in drift gillnet fisheries, making up nearly 30% of the total catch of the swordfish fishery employing drift gillnets in California. The bycatch rate is even higher for the Mediterranean swordfish industry, with 71% to 90% of the total catch being sunfish.

A decrease in sunfish populations may be caused by more frequent bycatch and the increasing popularity of sunfish in human diet. The fishery bycatch and destruction of ocean sunfish are unregulated worldwide. In some areas, the fish are "finned" by fishermen who regard them as worthless bait thieves; this process, in which the fins are cut off, results in the eventual death of the fish, because it can no longer propel itself without its dorsal and anal fins. The species is also threatened by floating litter such as plastic bags which resemble jellyfish, a common prey item. Bags can choke and suffocate a fish or fill its stomach to the extent that it starves.

=== In art ===
Sarongs worn by women in Lamalera, a village in the island of Lembata in the Lesser Sunda Islands of Indonesia, have patterns of this fish, which they know as kebuku.

=== In popular culture ===
In 2015, local fishermen Michael Bergin and Jason Foster in Boston Harbor misidentified an ocean sunfish variously (and enthusiastically) as a sea turtle, a baby whale—pronounced like "baby wheel"—a tuna, Moby Dick, and a flounder, and reported it to the Coast Guard, in a video replete with a profanity-laden Boston accent which led to their brief fame and a lasting impression in Boston cultural memory.

In 2017, a copypasta emerged on Facebook known as the "Sunfish Copypasta" berating the Sunfish for being "useless trash". The text went viral.

=== In captivity ===
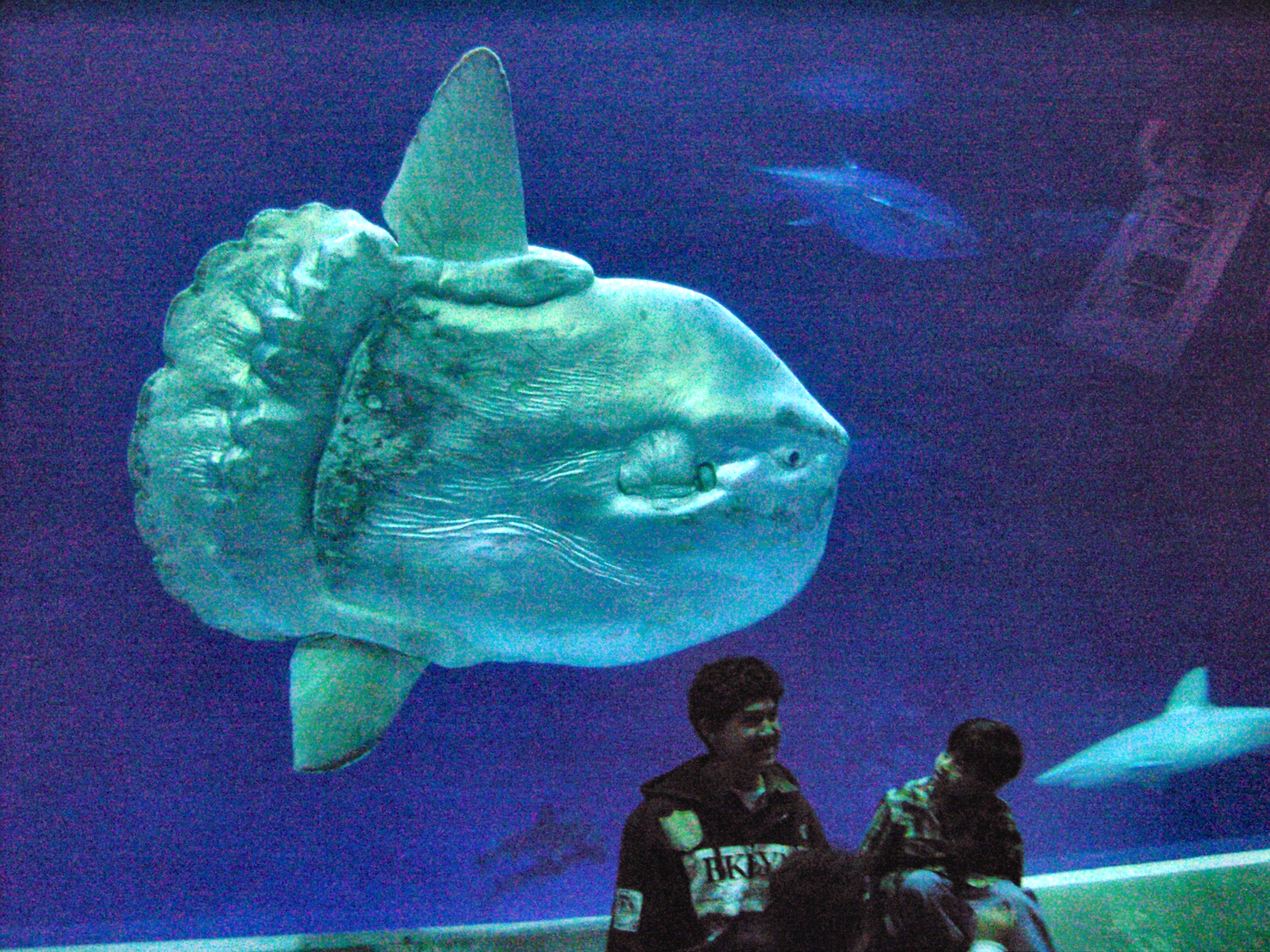
A tank at the Monterey Bay Aquarium provides a size comparison between an ocean sunfish and humans.

Sunfish are not widely held in aquarium exhibits, due to the unique and demanding requirements of their care. Some Asian aquaria display them, particularly in Japan. The Kaiyukan Aquarium in Osaka is one of few aquaria with Mola mola on display, where it is reportedly as popular an attraction as the larger whale sharks. The Lisbon Oceanarium in Portugal has ocean sunfish showcased in the main tank.

Sunfish in aquariums show affection and curiosity towards visitors. A sunfish kept in an aquarium in Kaikoyan became stressed and refused to eat after the aquarium closed for renovations and owners suspected that it was suffering from digestive issues or from parasites. However, the sunfish was unhappy that visitors were no longer coming and after the staff placed cardboard cutouts the sunfish recovered and began displaying “happy” behaviors such as waving its fins.

In Kamogawa Sea World the ocean sunfish named Kukey, who started captivity in 1982, set a world record for captivity for 2,993 days, living for eight years. Kukey was 72 cm (2.36 ft) at the time of delivery, but was 187 cm (6.14 ft) in size at the time of death.

Video of an ocean sunfish at the Lisbon Oceanarium

While the first ocean sunfish to be held in an aquarium in the United States is said to have arrived at the Monterey Bay Aquarium in August 1986, other specimens have previously been held at other locations. Marineland of the Pacific, closed since 1987 and located on the Palos Verdes Peninsula in Los Angeles County, California, held at least one ocean sunfish by 1961, and in 1964 held a 290-kilogram (650 lb) specimen, said to be the largest ever captured at that time. However, another 450-kilogram (1,000 lb) specimen was brought alive to Marineland Studios Aquarium, near St. Augustine, Florida, in 1941.

Because sunfish had not been kept in captivity on a large scale before, the staff at Monterey Bay was forced to innovate and create their own methods for capture, feeding, and parasite control. By 1998, these issues were overcome, and the aquarium was able to hold a specimen for more than a year, later releasing it after its weight increased by more than 14 times. Mola mola has since become a permanent feature of the Open Sea exhibit. Monterey Bay Aquarium's largest sunfish specimen was euthanized on February 14, 2008, after an extended period of poor health.

A major concern to curators is preventive measures taken to keep specimens in captivity from injuring themselves by rubbing against the walls of a tank, since ocean sunfish cannot easily maneuver their bodies. In a smaller tank, hanging a vinyl curtain has been used as a stopgap measure to convert a cuboid tank to a rounded shape and prevent the fish from scraping against the sides. A more effective solution is simply to provide enough room for the sunfish to swim in wide circles. The tank must also be sufficiently deep to accommodate the vertical height of the sunfish, which may reach 3.2 m (10 ft 6 in).

Feeding captive sunfish in a tank with faster-moving, more aggressive fish can also present a challenge. Eventually, the fish can be taught to respond to a floating target to be fed, and to take food from the end of a pole or from human hands.
