= Aktaua =

Aktaua Temporal range: Lutetian

Scientific classification
- Kingdom: Animalia
- Phylum: Chordata
- Class: Chondrichthyes
- Subclass: Elasmobranchii
- Order: Rhinopristiformes
- Family: Pristidae
- Genus: †Aktaua; Case et al., 1996

Extinct genus of Sawfish

Aktaua is an extinct genus of sawfish from the Lutetian stage of the Eocene epoch. It is currently known from a single species, A. kizylkumensis. It is found in the White Mountain Formation of Uzbekistan. The species was named for the Kizylkum Desert, in which it was found. The genus name is derived from the Uzbek word for "white," in reference to the formation it was found in.
