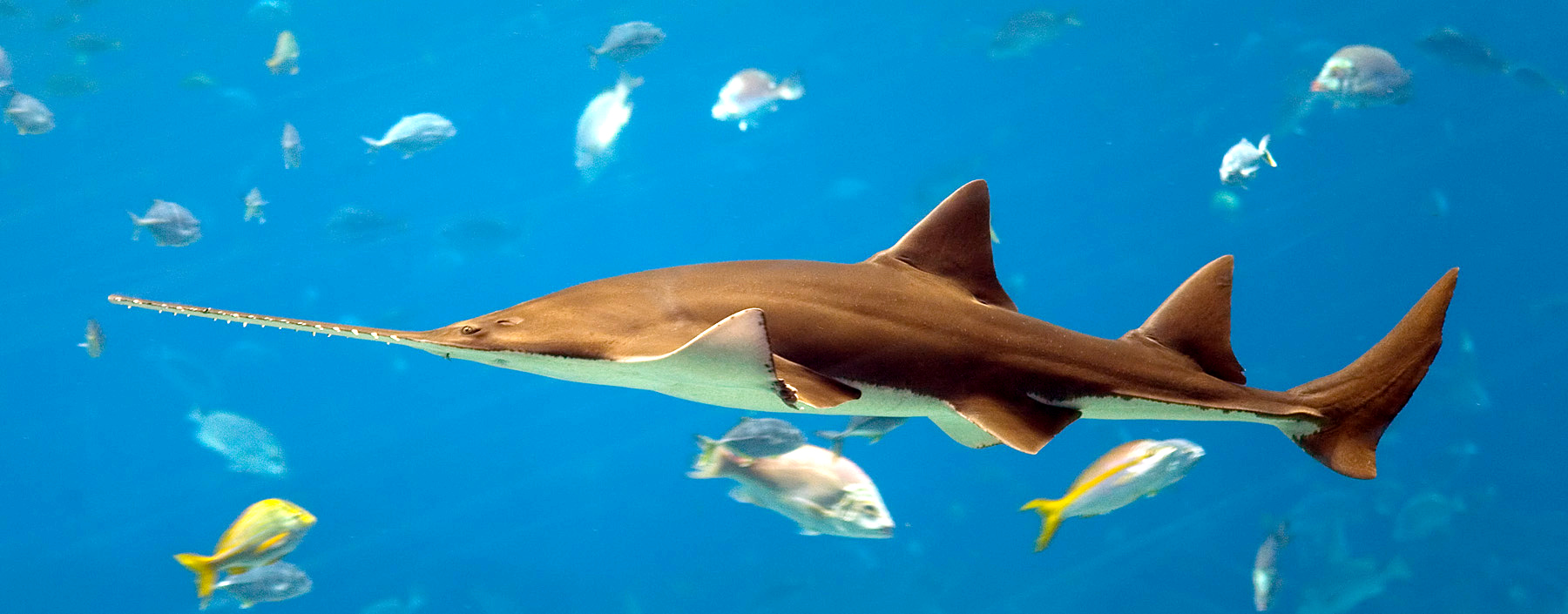
- At Georgia Aquarium
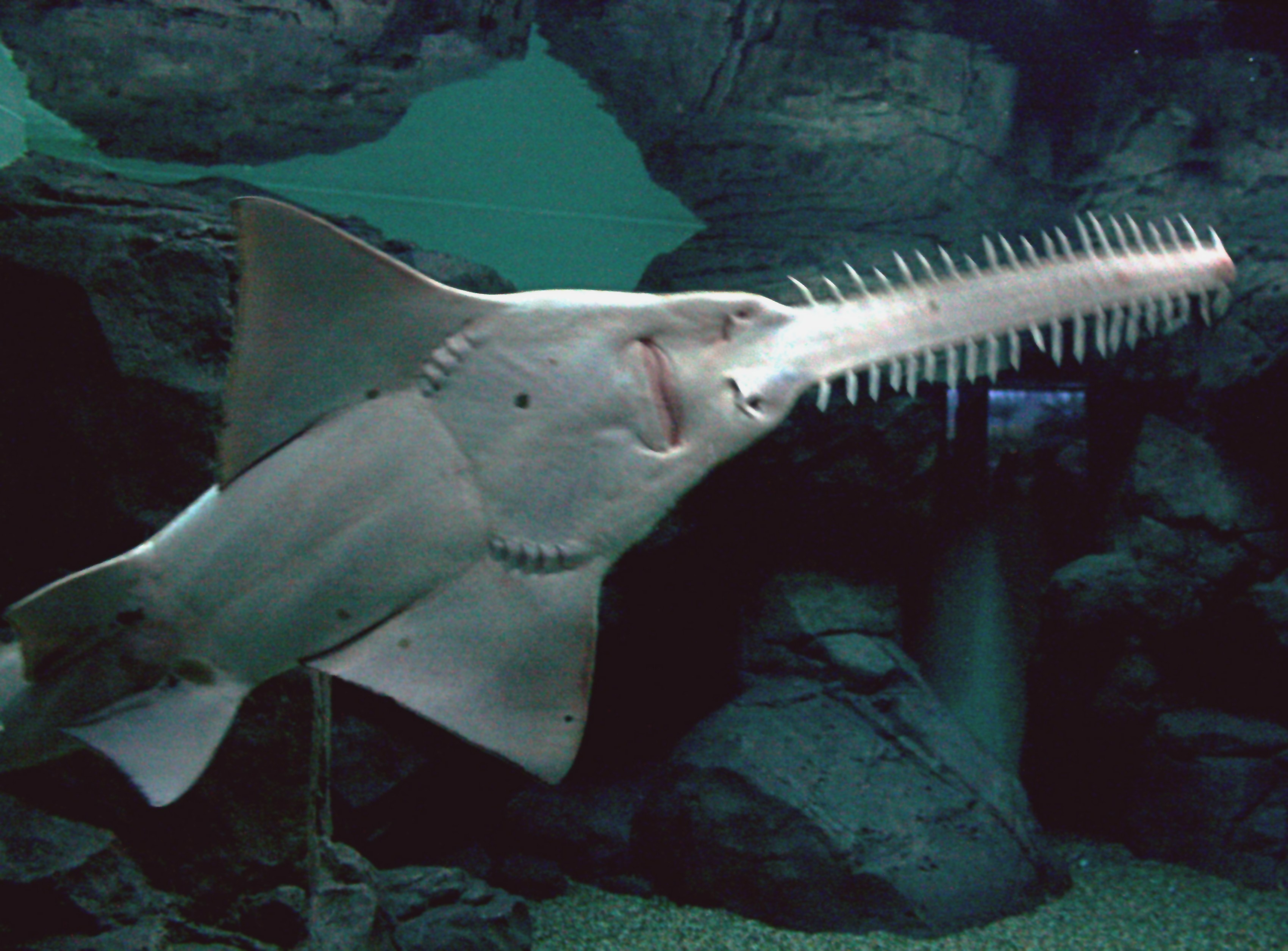
- At Shanghai Ocean Aquarium, China

Conservation status
- Critically Endangered (IUCN 3.1)
- CITES Appendix I

Scientific classification
- Kingdom: Animalia
- Phylum: Chordata
- Class: Chondrichthyes
- Subclass: Elasmobranchii
- Order: Rhinopristiformes
- Family: Pristidae
- Genus: Pristis
- Species: P. pristis

Binomial name
- Pristis pristis (Linnaeus, 1758)

Synonyms
- Pristis microdon Latham, 1794; Pristis perotteti J. P. Müller & Henle, 1841

= Largetooth sawfish =

Species of cartilaginous fish

The largetooth sawfish (Pristis pristis, syn. P. microdon and P. perotteti) is a species of sawfish in the family Pristidae. It is found worldwide in tropical and subtropical coastal regions, but also enters freshwater. It has declined drastically and is now critically endangered.

A range of English names have been used for the species, or populations now part of the species, including common sawfish (despite it being far from common today), wide sawfish, freshwater sawfish, river sawfish (less frequently, other sawfish species also occur in freshwater and rivers), Leichhardt's sawfish (after explorer and naturalist Ludwig Leichhardt) and northern sawfish.

== Taxonomy ==
Historically, the taxonomy of P. pristis, in relation to P. microdon (claimed range: Western Indo-Pacific) and P. perotteti (claimed range: Atlantic and Eastern Pacific), has caused considerable confusion; evidence published in 2013 revealed that the three are conspecific, as morphological and genetic differences are lacking. As a consequence, recent authorities treat P. microdon and P. perotteti as synonyms of P. pristis; based on genetic analyses of NADH-2 genes, there are three main clades of P. pristis: Atlantic, Indo-West Pacific and East Pacific.

The scientific name Pristis (both the generic and specific names) is derived from the Greek word for "saw".

== Description ==
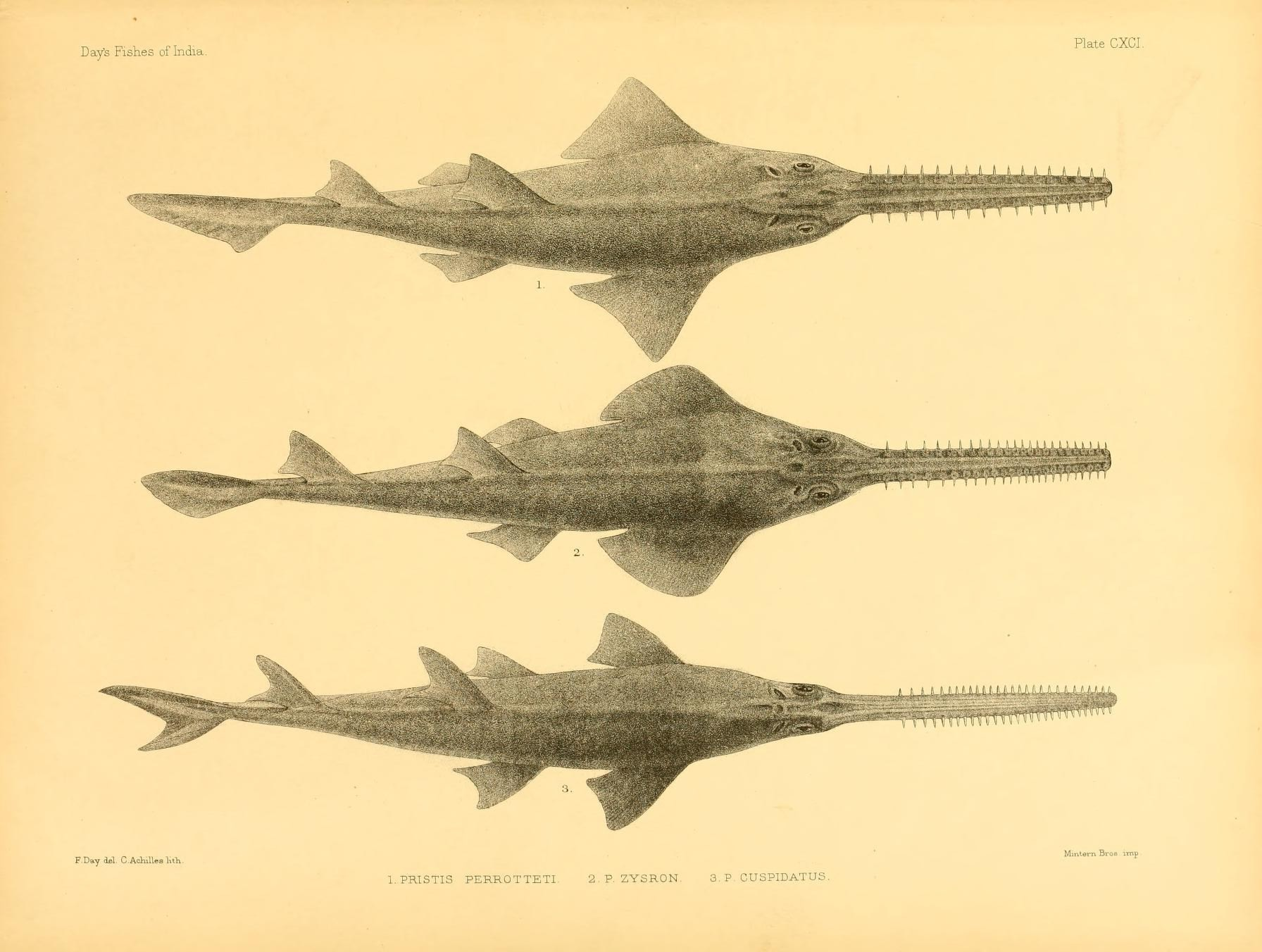
Comparison of the largetooth sawfish (top), green sawfish (P. zijsron; middle) and knifetooth sawfish (Anoxypristis cuspidata; bottom). Notice especially the width of the saw, the teeth on the saw, the shape of the tail and pectoral fins, and the position of the dorsal fin compared to the pelvic fins.

The largetooth sawfish may mature to 15 ft in total length, though the largest confirmed specimen was a 7 m (23 ft)-long West African individual. A sawfish caught in 1951 near Galveston, Texas, was documented on film but not measured; this fish has been estimated to be of similar size. Today, most individuals are far smaller and a typical length is 2–2.5 m (6.6–8.2 ft). Large individuals may weigh as much as 500–600 kg (1,102–1,323 lb), or possibly even more.

The largetooth sawfish is recognized by the forward position of the dorsal fin with its leading edge placed in front of the leading edge of the pelvic fins (when the sawfish is seen from above or the side), the relatively long pectoral fins with angular tips, and the presence of a small lower tail lobe. In all other sawfish species the leading edge of their dorsal fin is placed at, or behind, the leading edge of the pelvic fins, and all other Pristis sawfish species have shorter pectoral fins with less pointed tips and lack a distinct lower tail lobe (very small or none). The rostrum ("saw") of the largetooth sawfish has a width that is 15–25% of its length, which is relatively wide compared to the other sawfish species, and there are 14–24 equally separated teeth on each side of it. (Note: Sawfish occasionally lose teeth during their life and these are not replaced. Correct tooth count refers to actual teeth and alveoli ("tooth sockets") from lost teeth.) On average, females have shorter rostrums with fewer teeth than males. The rostral teeth are large and grooved from base to tip. The proportional rostrum length also varies with age, with average being around 27% of the total length of the fish, but can be as high as 30% in juveniles and as low as 20–22% in adults.

Its upperparts are generally grey to yellowish-brown, often with a clear yellow tinge to the fins. Individuals in freshwater may have a reddish colour caused by blood suffusion below the skin. The underside is greyish or white.

== Distribution and habitat ==
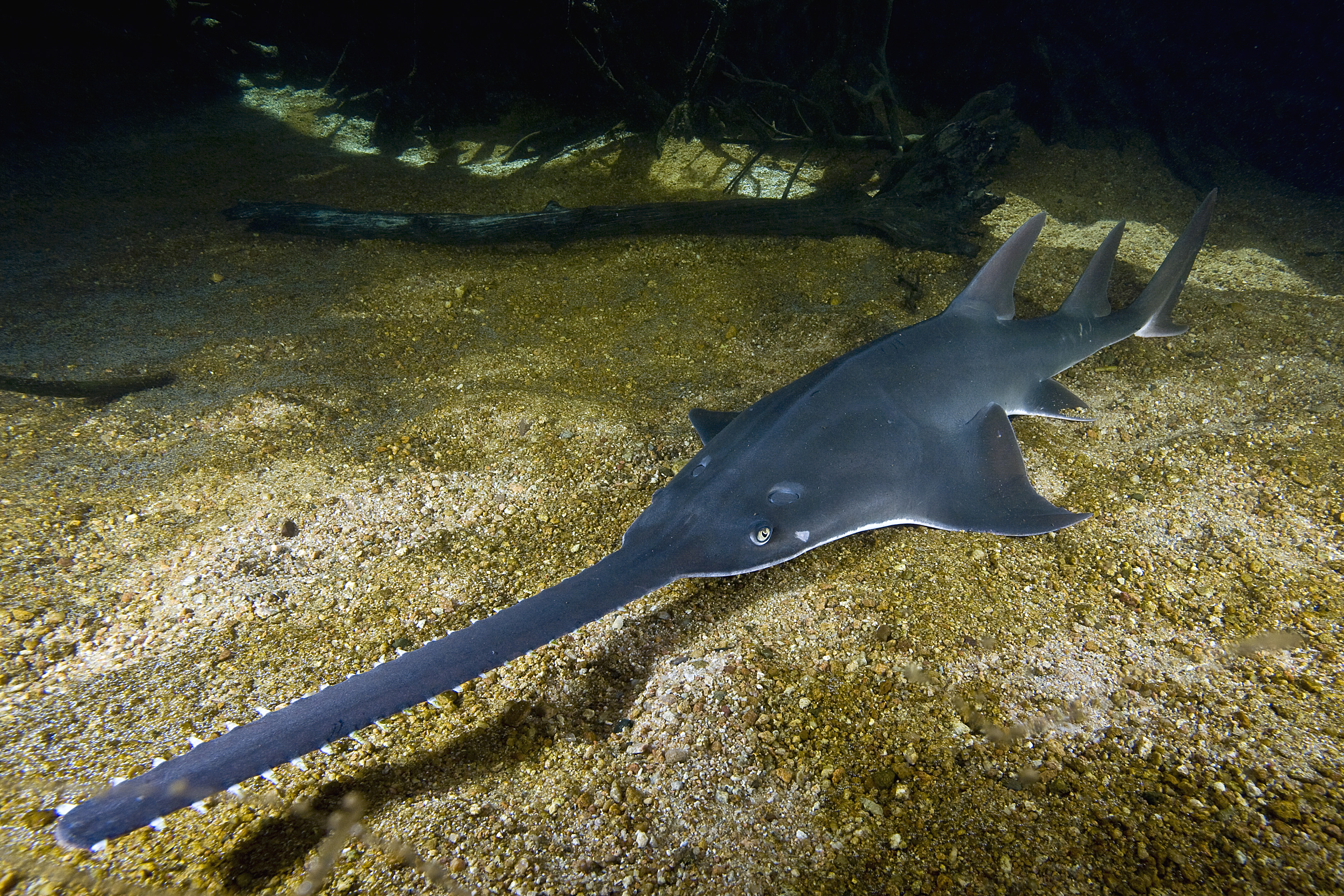
A largetooth sawfish in Australia, the only country that still has a relatively healthy population of this species

The largetooth sawfish can be found worldwide in tropical and subtropical coastal regions, but it also enters freshwater and has been recorded in rivers as far as 1,340 km (830 mi) from the sea. Historically, its East Atlantic range was from Mauritania to Angola. There are old reports (last in the late 1950s or shortly after) from the Mediterranean and these have typically been regarded as vagrants, but a review of records strongly suggests that this sea had a breeding population. Its West Atlantic range was from Uruguay to the Caribbean and the Gulf of Mexico. Although there are claimed reports from several Gulf Coast states in the United States, a review indicates that only those from Texas are genuine. Other specimens, notably several claimed to be from Florida, were likely imported from other countries. Its East Pacific range was from Peru to Mazatlán in Mexico. Historically it was widespread in the Indo-Pacific, ranging from South Africa to the Horn of Africa, India, Southeast Asia and Northern Australia. Its total distribution covered almost 7,200,000 km^{2} (2,800,000 mi^{2}), more than any other species of sawfish, but it has disappeared from much of its historical range. The last record taken in the Mediterranean dates back to 1959. A parasitic flatworm, Dermopristis paradoxus, is commonly found on the skin and lining of the mouth and exclusively in Australian waters on the largetooth sawfish. The flatworm has been discovered to have a male reproductive system that lacks the copulatory organ.

Adults are primarily found in estuaries and marine waters, to a depth of 25 m (82 ft) (though mostly less than 10 m (33 ft). Nevertheless, the species does appear to have a greater affinity for freshwater habitats than the smalltooth sawfish (P. pectinata), green sawfish (P. zijsron), and dwarf sawfish (P. clavata). Largetooth sawfish from the population in Lake Nicaragua appear to spend most, if not all, of their life in freshwater, but tagging surveys indicate that at least some do move between this lake and the sea. Captive studies show that this euryhaline species can thrive long-term in both salt and freshwater, regardless of its age, and that an acclimation from salt to freshwater is faster than the opposite. In captivity they are known to be agile (even swimming backwards), have an unusual ability to "climb" with the use of the pectoral fins and they can jump far out of the water; a 1.8-metre-long (5.9 ft) individual jumped to a height of 5 m (16 ft). It has been suggested that this may be adaptions for traversing medium-sized waterfalls and rapids when moving upriver. They are generally found in areas with a bottom consisting of sand, mud or silt. The preferred water temperature is between 24 and 32 °C (75–90 °F), and 19 °C (66 °F) or colder is lethal.

== Behavior and life cycle ==
The largetooth sawfish's maturity is reached once a length of about 2.8–3 m (9.2–9.8 ft) is attained, at roughly 7–10 years old. Breeding is seasonal in this ovoviviparous species, but the exact timing appears to vary depending on the region. The adult females can breed once every 1–2 years, the gestation period is about five months, and there are indications that mothers return to the region where they were born to give birth to their own young. There are 1–13 (average c. 7) young in each litter, which are 72–90 cm (28–35 in) long at birth. They are likely typically born in salt or brackish water near river mouths, but move into freshwater where the young spend the first 3–5 years of their life, sometimes as much as 400 km (250 mi) upriver. In the Amazon basin the largetooth sawfish has been reported even further upstream, and this mostly involves young individuals that are up to 2 m (6.6 ft) long. Occasionally, young individuals become isolated in freshwater pools during floods and may live there for years. The potential lifespan of the largetooth sawfish is unknown, but four estimates suggested 30 years, 35 years, 44 years, and 80 years.

The largetooth sawfish is a predator that feeds on fish, molluscs and crustaceans. The "saw" can be used both to stir up the bottom to find prey and to slash at groups of fish. Sawfish are docile and harmless to humans, except when captured where they can inflict serious injuries when defending themselves with the "saw".

== Conservation ==
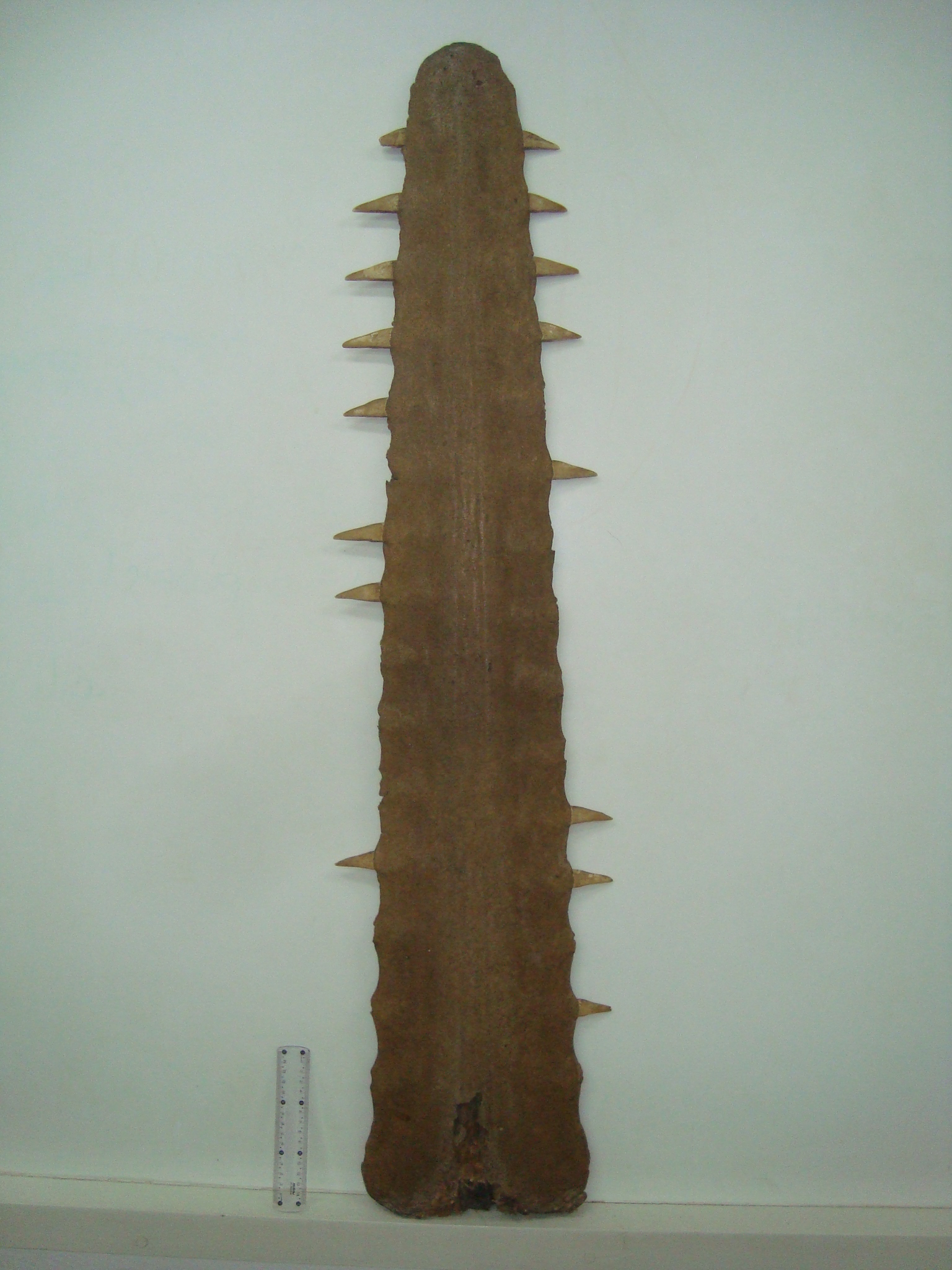
A large rostrum or "saw" from a largetooth sawfish with several teeth missing (black marks on ruler are 5 cm or 2 in apart)

As suggested by the alternative name common sawfish, it was once plentiful, but has now declined drastically leading to it being considered a critically endangered species by the IUCN. The main threat is overfishing, but it also suffers from habitat loss. Both their fins (used in shark fin soup) and "saw" (as novelty items) are highly valuable, and the meat is used as food. Because of the "saw" they are particularly prone to becoming entangled in fishing nets. Historically sawfish were also harvested for the oil in their liver. In the Niger Delta region of southern Nigeria, sawfish (known as oki in Ijaw and neighbouring languages) are traditionally hunted for their saws, which are used in masquerades.

The largetooth sawfish has been extirpated from many regions where formerly present. Among the 75 countries where recorded historically, it has disappeared from 28 and may have disappeared from another 27, leaving only 20 countries where certainly still present. In terms of area this means that it certainly survives in only 39% of its historical range. Only Australia still has a relatively healthy population of the species and this may be the last remaining population in the entire Indo-Pacific that is of sufficient size to be viable, but even it has experienced a decline. Other places in the Indo-Pacific where still present, even if in very low numbers, are off Eastern Africa, the Indian subcontinent and Papua New Guinea, and in the East Pacific it survives off Central America, Colombia and northern Peru. Whether it survives anywhere in Southeast Asia is generally unclear, but one was captured in the Philippines in 2014 (a country where otherwise considered extirpated). The species has disappeared from much of its Atlantic range and declined where still present. The likely largest remaining population in this region is in the Amazon estuary, but another important population is in the San Juan River system in Central America. It was once abundant in Lake Nicaragua (part of the San Juan River system), but this population rapidly crashed during the 1970s when tens of thousands were caught. It has been protected in Nicaragua since the early 1980s, but remains rare in the lake today, and is now threatened by the planned Nicaragua Canal. In West Africa, the Bissagos Archipelago has often been considered the last remaining stronghold, but interviews with locals indicate that sawfish now also are rare there.

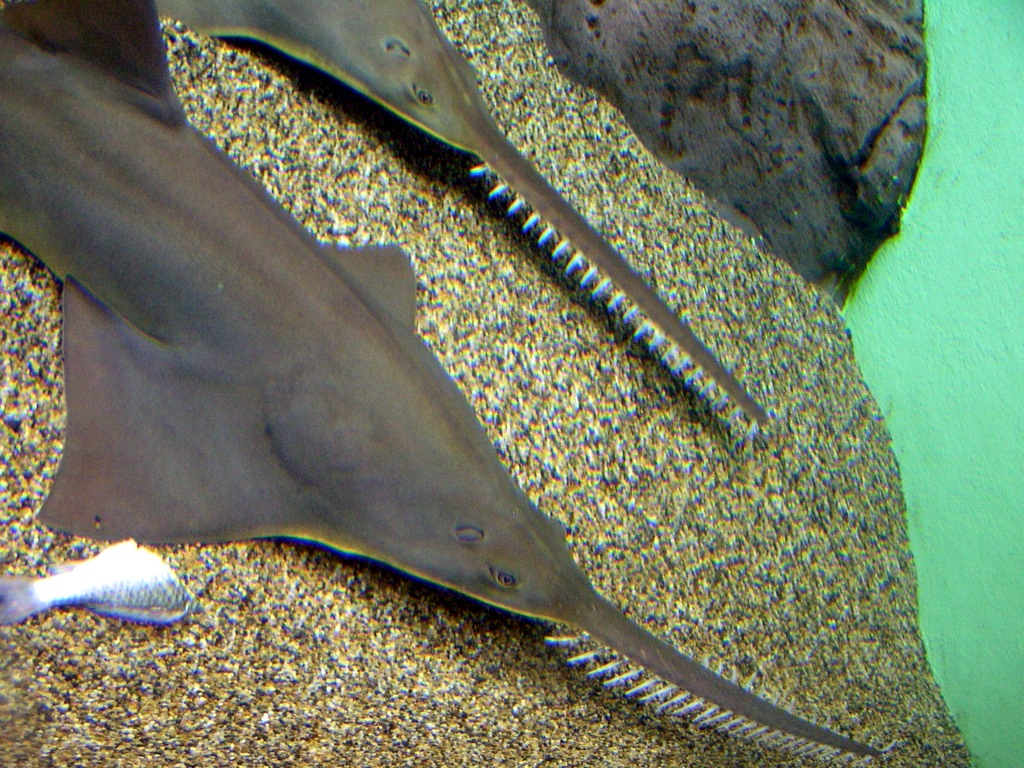
Two largetooth sawfish at the Shanghai Ocean Aquarium, China

All sawfish species were added to CITES Appendix I in 2007, thereby restricting international trade. As the first marine fish, there was an attempt of having it listed under the Endangered Species Act (ESA) in 2003 by the United States National Marine Fisheries Service, but it was declined. However, it was listed as P. perotteti under the ESA in 2011. Following taxonomic changes, the ESA listing was updated to P. pristis in December 2014. Sawfish are protected in Australia and the United States where a number of conservation projects have been initiated, but the largetooth sawfish has probably already been extirpated from the latter country (last confirmed record in 1961 from Nueces, Texas). Additionally it receives a level of protection in Bangladesh, Brazil, Guinea, India, Indonesia, Malaysia, Mexico, Nicaragua, Senegal and South Africa, but illegal fishing continues, enforcement of fishing laws is often lacking and it has already disappeared from some of these countries.

Largetooth sawfish, especially young, are sometimes eaten by crocodiles and large sharks. This species is the most numerous sawfish in public aquariums, but it is often listed under the synonym P. microdon. Studbooks included 16 individuals (10 males, 6 females) in North American aquariums in 2014, 5 individuals (3 males, 2 females) in European aquariums in 2013, and 13 individuals (6 males, 7 females) in Australian aquariums in 2017. Others are kept at public aquariums in Asia.

== See also ==
- Threatened rays
