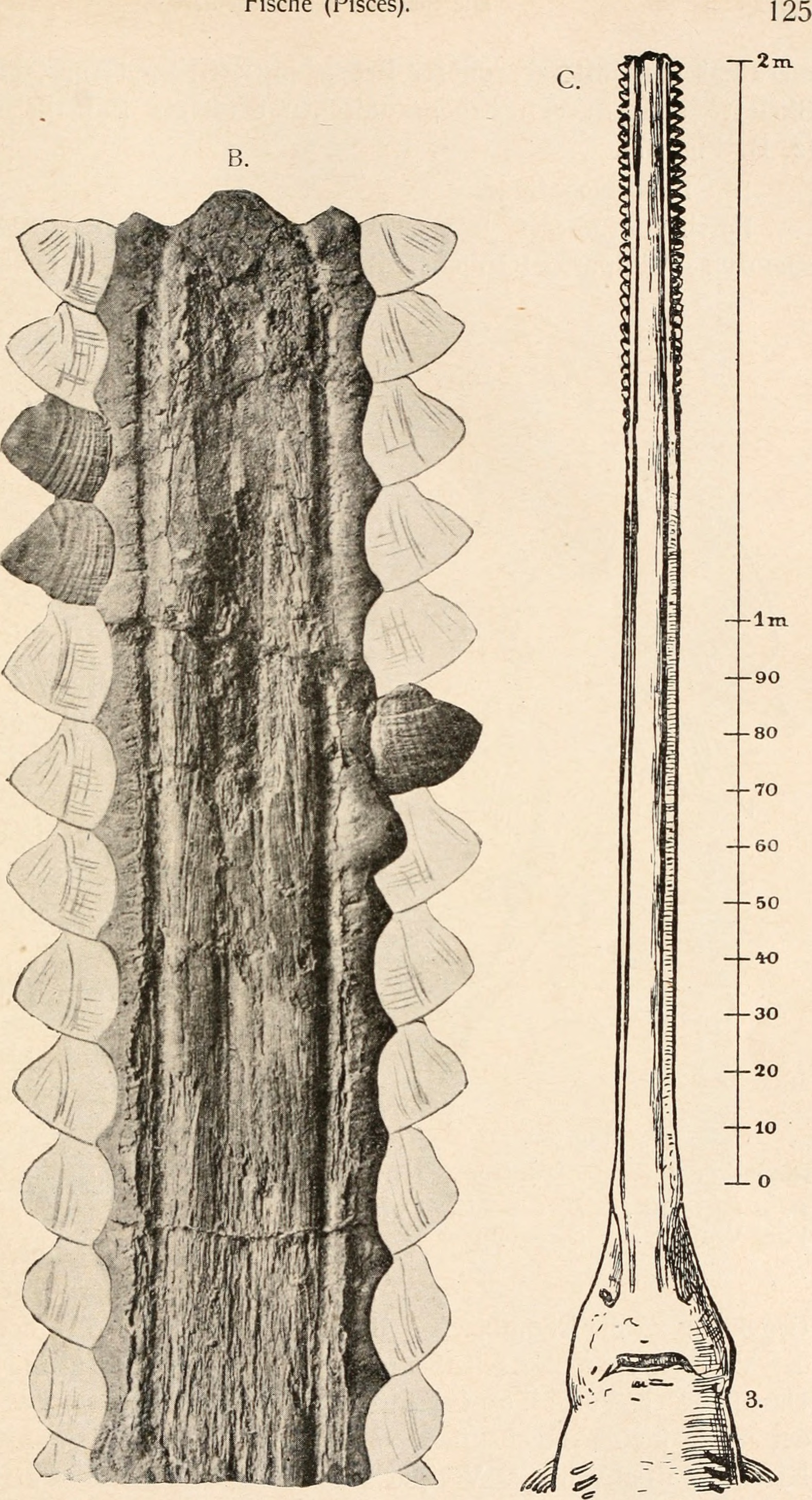
- Rostrum of P. schweinfurthi

Scientific classification
- Kingdom: Animalia
- Phylum: Chordata
- Class: Chondrichthyes
- Subclass: Elasmobranchii
- Order: Rhinopristiformes
- Family: Pristidae
- Genus: †Propristis; Dames, 1883

Type species
- †Propristis schweinfurthi Dames, 1883

Other species
- †Propristis mayumbensis Dartevelle & Casier, 1943

Synonyms
- Genus synonymy: Amblypristis Dames, 1888; Eopristis Stromer, 1905; Copristis Kinkelin, 1905 (lapsus calami); Species synonymy: P. schweinfurthi; Amblypristis cheops Dames, 1888; Eopristis reinachi Stromer, 1905

= Propristis =

Propristis Temporal range: Eocene-Miocene

Extinct genus of cartilaginous fishes

Propristis is an extinct genus of sawfish that lived from the Eocene to the Miocene. It contains two valid species, P. schweinfurthi and P. mayumbensis. It has been found in Egypt, Cabinda, Morocco, Qatar, Spain, the United Kingdom, and the United States. Isolated rostral denticles are the most common remains, but rostra has also been found.
