= Shanghai Ocean Aquarium =

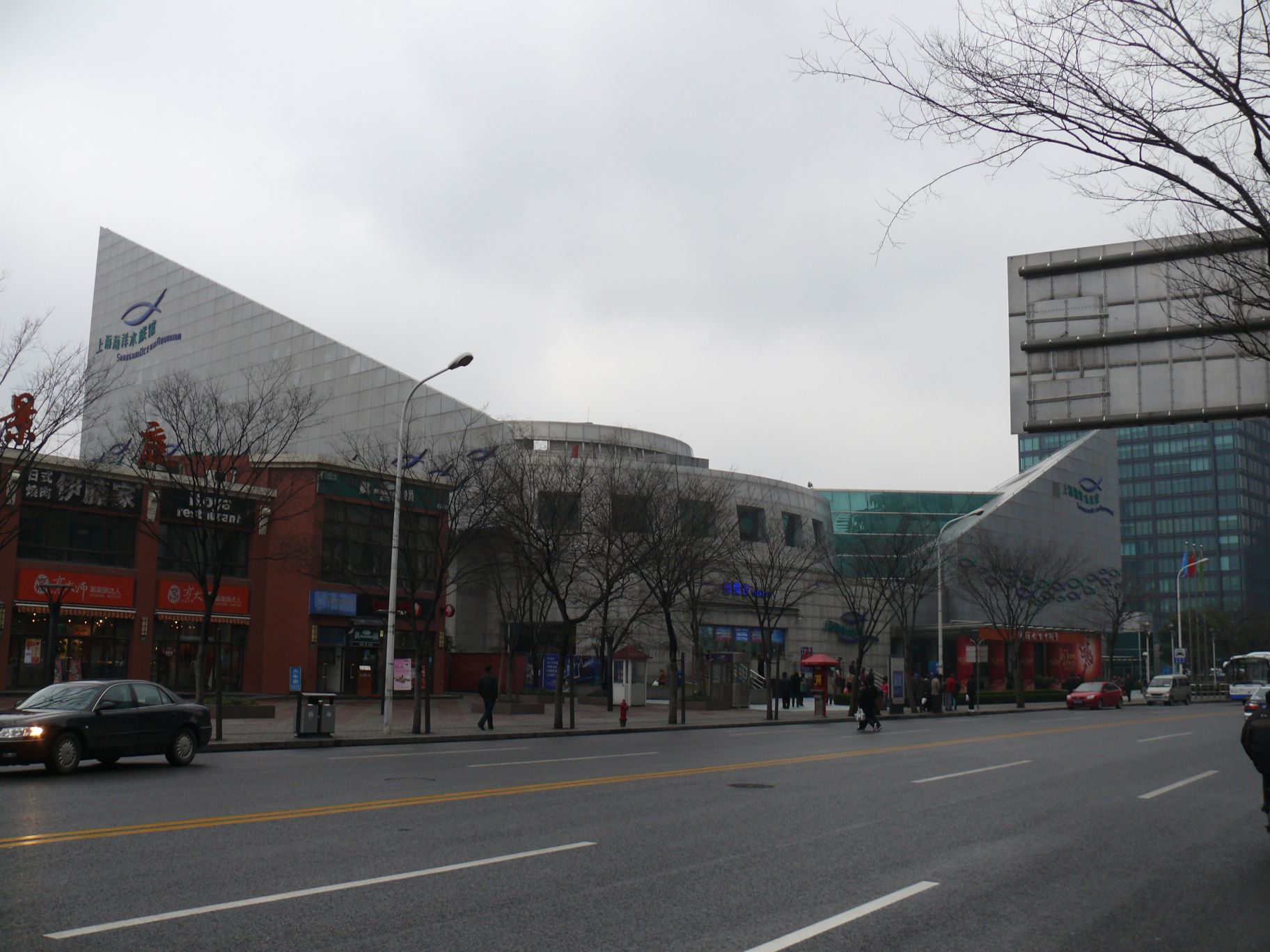
- Shanghai Ocean Aquarium
- Interactive map of Shanghai Ocean Aquarium
- 31°14′33″N 121°29′50″E
- Date opened: 2002
- Location: Shanghai, China
- Land area: 20,500 m^{2} (221,000 sq ft)
- No. of species: >450
- Volume of largest tank: 2,200 m^{3} (580,000 U.S. gal)
- Total volume of tanks: 4,900 m^{3} (1,300,000 U.S. gal)
- Annual visitors: one million
- Website: www.sh-aquarium.com/en/html/index.aspx

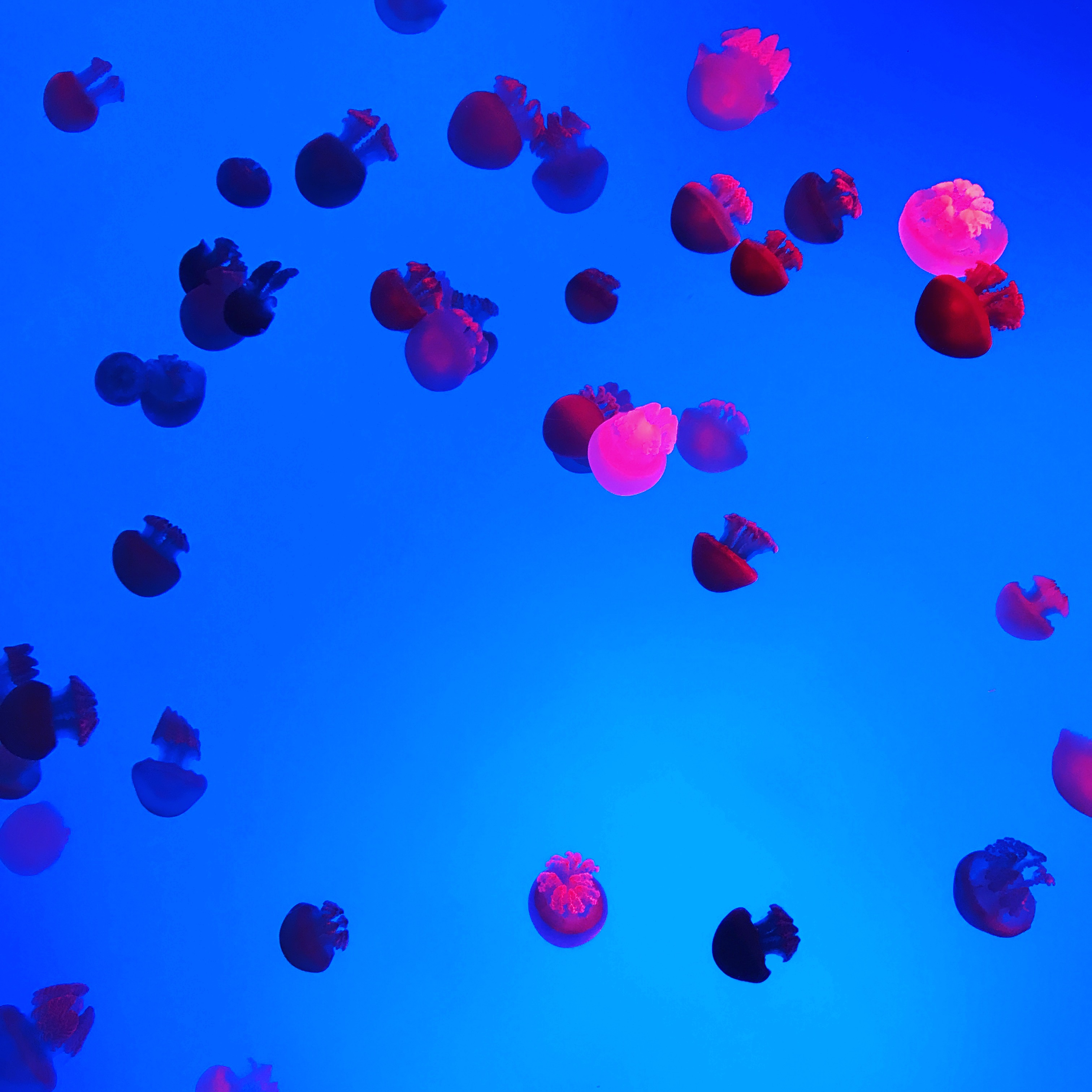
Pink jellyfish in the aquarium

The Shanghai Ocean Aquarium (Chinese: 上海海洋水族馆) is a public aquarium located in Shanghai, China.

Designed by Advanced Aquarium Technologies, the aquarium includes a 168-meter (551 ft) tunnel that takes visitors through a coastal reef, open ocean, a kelp cave, shark cove, and a coral reef, and is one of the longest such tunnels in the world. The aquarium takes visitors through several exhibit "zones," including China Zone, South America Zone, Africa Zone, etc.

== Animals ==
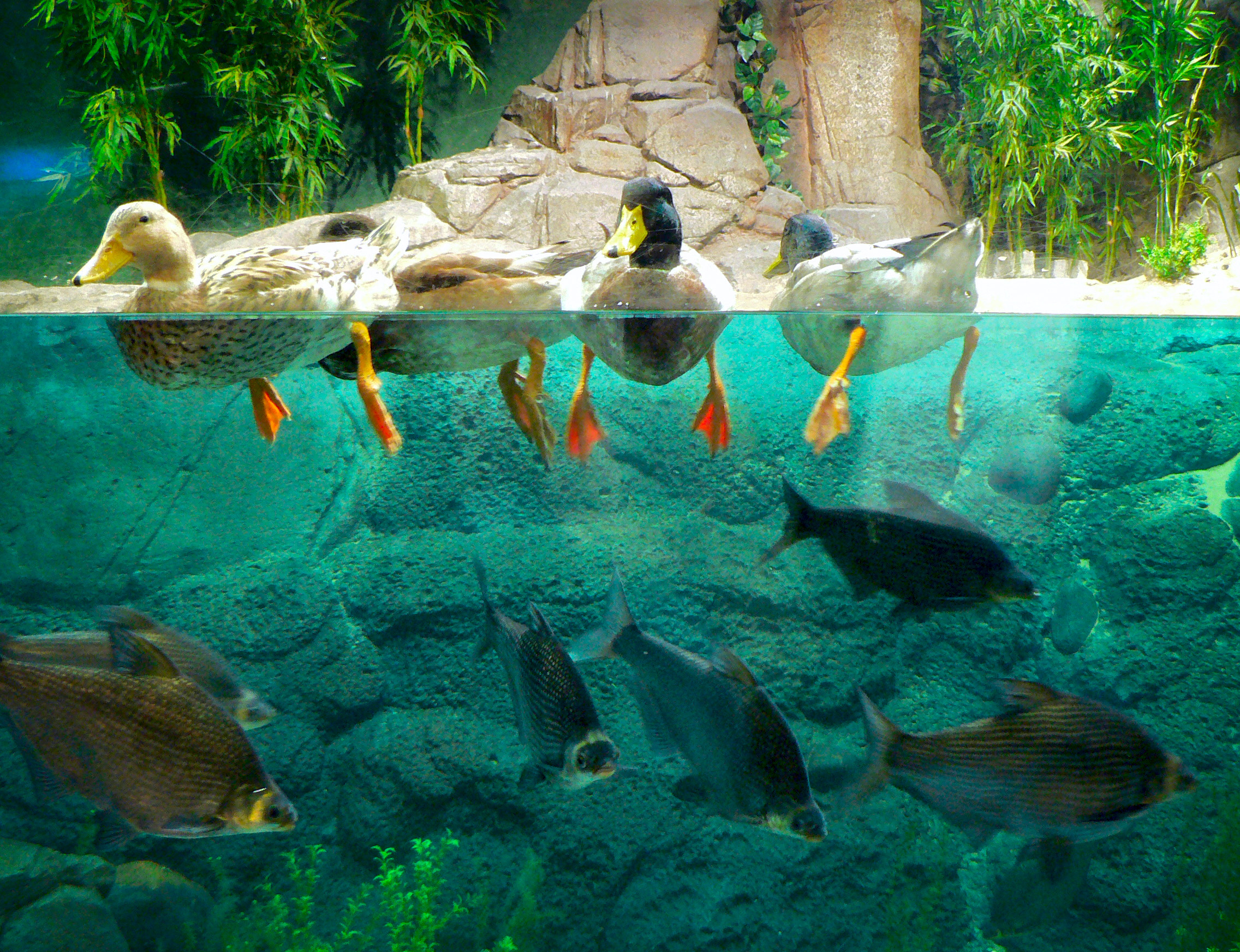
Ducks in Shanghai Ocean Aquarium

- Archerfish
- Blackback Butterflyfish
- Blue tang
- Chinese alligator
- Chinese Sturgeon
- Chinese giant salamander
- Chinese water dragon
- Cichlids
- Electric eel
- Freshwater sawfish
- Giant gourami
- Giant grouper
- Clown featherback
- Black ghost knife fish
- Sand tiger shark
- Blacktip reef shark
- Green sea turtle
- Horseshoe crab
- Humboldt penguin
- Magellanic Penguin
- Cofish
- Humphead wrasse
- Japanese giant spider crab
- Port Jackson shark
- Leafy sea dragon
- Lion fish
- Moorish Idol
- Spot-fin porcupinefish
- Pirarucu
- Rainbowfish
- Seahorses
- South American lungfish
- Spotted eagle ray
- Cownose ray
- Shark ray
- Spotted seal
- Tawny nurse shark
- Walking catfish
- Weedy sea dragon
- Moon jelly
- Pacific Sea Nettles
- Egg-yolk Jellyfish
- Neon Jellyfish
- Dragon moray eel
- Pink whipray
- Razorfish
- Pipefish
- Orange-barred garden eel
- Porcupine Puffer
- Green spotted puffer fish
- Humpback Puffer
- Senegal Bichir
- Squarespot Anthias
- Flashlight fish
- Zebra shark
- Whitetip reef shark
- Sea anemone

== See also ==
- Shanghai Disneyland
- Shanghai Haichang Ocean Park
