= Romaleodelphis =

Romaleodelphis Temporal range: Early Miocene (Aquitanian) 22.5–22 Ma

Scientific classification
- Kingdom: Animalia
- Phylum: Chordata
- Class: Mammalia
- Order: Artiodactyla
- Infraorder: Cetacea
- Parvorder: Odontoceti
- Genus: †Romaleodelphis; Sanchez-Posada et al., 2024
- Species: †R. pollerspoecki

Binomial name
- †Romaleodelphis pollerspoecki Sanchez-Posada et al., 2024

Extinct genus of dolphins

Romaleodelphis is a genus of extinct archaic toothed whale from the Early Miocene Ebelsberg Formation of Austria. It had long and slender jaws and homodont teeth and roamed the marine waters of the Central Paratethys that once covered much of Europe. Phylogenetic analysis has shown that Romaleodelphis is most closely related to other odotontocetes previously grouped together as the "Chilcacetus clade, now a paraphyletic grade basal to true dolphins and beaked whales. The inner ear of Romaleodelphis shows that it was capable of hearing narrow-band high frequency sounds, an ability it convergently evolved with several modern types of whales. It is possible that this was a useful tool in evading other predatory whales, though some recent research suggests that it may have also been an early step in the development of the cetacean biosonar.

== History and naming ==
The holotype skull of Romaleodelphis was discovered in 1980 in the sediments of the Ebelsberg Formation during the construction of a hydroelectric powerplant near the town of Pucking, Upper Austria. At the time, several amateur paleontologists, among them Jürgen Pollerspöck, removed fossil material from the site to prevent their destruction. The total material collected for Romaleodelphis consisted of a multitude of skull fragments that were put together by the collectors as well as several postcranial remains. Put together, the skull is mostly complete but lacks the tips of the rostrum and much of the basicranium. However, while the skull material was donated to the Staatliche Naturwissenschaftliche Sammlungen Bayerns by Pollerspöck, the postcranial material was kept by other collectors and their whereabouts are currently unknown. Despite being donated in 1992, it would take another 30 years for the skull to be described, with the paper being published by Catalina Sanchez-Posada and colleagues in 2024.

The name Romaleodelphis derives from the Greek "'romaléos" meaning sturdy or robust, in reference to the strong zygomatic process of the squamosal bone, and the -suffix "delphis". This suffix is commonly employed for the scientific names of dolphins and traces its meaning to the Greek "dophis" for womb, initially used to highlight the fact that unlike fish, dolphins have a uterus. The species name on the other hand references Jürgen Pollerspöck, who discovered, saved and donated the holotype fossil.

== Description ==
Romaleodelphis was a medium sized toothed whale with long and slender jaws that make up about 71% of the total skull length. The animal was homodont, meaning that like most modern toothed whales and unlike several now extinct forms that coexisted with Romaleodelphis it possessed only a single type of tooth in its jaws.

== Phylogeny ==
The phylogenetic analysis conducted in the type description of Romaleodelphis recovered 15 most parsimonious trees, the strict consensus of which showing that the animal was a derived toothed whale. Specifically, Romaleodelphis was found to clade in a polytomy with Chilcacetus, Argyrocetus bakersfieldensis and a larger grouping consisting of the extant members of Delphinidae (dolphins) and Ziphiidae (beaked whales), their fossil relatives as well as a series of fossil whales previously grouped as the "Chilcacetus clade". In the strict consensus tree, the "Chilcacetus clade" forms an evolutionary grade leading up to dolphins and beaked whales and includes the name-giving Chilcacetus, Romaleodelphis, three species of Argyrocetus (none of which are each others closest relatives) and Macrodelphinus.

More broadly, this phylogeny finds that the "Chilcacetus clade", dolphins and beaked whales are each others closest relatives and that the sister group to these three is formed by the river dolphins of the Platanistoidea and their extinct relatives the Eurhinodelphinidae. Other taxa included in the study were Squalodon and Waipatia, two much more basally branching toothed whales.

- - Zygorhiza
  - - Squalodon
    - - Waipatia
      - - - Eoplatanista
          - - Eurhinodelphinidae
            - Platanistoidea
        - - Chilcacetus
          - Argyrocetus bakersfieldensis
          - Romaleodelphis
          - - Argyrocetus joaquinensis
            - - - Argyrocetus patagonicus
                - Macrodelphinus
              - - Yaquinacetus
                - - Delphinidae
                  - - Squaloziphius
                    - Ziphiidae

The supplementary material further includes a 50% majority-rule consensus tree in which rather than being a grade, a slimmed down version of the "Chilcacetus clade" (consisting of Romaleodelphis, Argyrocetus bakersfieldensis and Chilcacetus) actually forms a monophyletic group with Romaleodelphis as the earliest diverging member. It is therefore possible that the "Chilcacetus clade" originated in the Paratethys before spreading across the Atlantic and colonizing the coasts of North and South America, were most members of this group are known from.

== Paleobiology ==
=== Hearing abilities ===
Principal component analysis (PCA) has shown that the anatomy of Romaleodelphis' earbones would indicate that it was capable of hearing narrow-band high frequency sounds. This makes Romaleodolphin the first known archaic homodont toothed whale with the ability to perceive the kinds of sounds made by modern toothed whales like porpoises and dwarf spermwhales, which acquired this ability convergently. The PCA also suggests that some early members of Platanistoidea fall into the same morphospace, likely representing yet another example of narrow-band high frequency hearing arising independently among toothed whales. Notably however, the shape of the cochlea differs between these early platanistoids and Romaleodelphis, which may be related to them filling different niches in their respective ecosystems. Whatever the case, the hearing apparatus of Romaleodelphis provides additional evidence for the early and repeated evolution of such hearing, which is seen in Early Oligoccene platanistoids from New Zealand, Romaleodelphis from Early Miocene Austria and the Middle Miocene eurhinodelphinid Xiphiacetus (also from Europe).

The function of narrow-band high frequency hearing is uncertain. One hypothesis has proposed that such hearing is advantageous when trying to avoid large predatory whales like macroraptorial sperm whales and orcas, whereas other research has suggested that this form of hearing is simply an early stage in the evolution of echolocation. Whatever the case, the anatomy of the semicircular canals in Romaleodelphis suggests that the hearing was more sensitive to head movement than in Xiphiacetus and porpoises, as inferred based on comparison with certain baleen whales and the bottlenose dolphin.

=== Paleoenvironment ===
Romaleodelphis was discovered in the sediments of the Ebelsberg Formation near the Upper Austrian town of Pucking. This Lagerstätte is known to represent a marine neritic environment of the Central Paratethys, which once covered much of Central Europe. In addition to the clear signs of a marine environment, not limited to the present fauna which includes the sunfish Austromola, various sharks, at least one other dolphin and many marine fish, the Ebelsberg Formation also preserves evidence of some freshwater influence through nearby rivers that emptied into the Paratethys. Since narrow-band high frequency hearing is not associated with any biome in particular (dwarf sperm whales are pelagic animals that inhabit the open oceans, porpoises stay close to the coast and the La Plata dolphin even swims up estuaries), Sanchez-Posada and colleagues speculate that it is possible that Romaleodelphis could have theoretically been capable of traveling between fresh-, salt- and brackish water.
