= Ebelsberg Formation =

Geologic formation in Austria

- Stratigraphic range: Aquitanian 22 Ma
- Type: Formation
- Underlies: Hall Formation
- Overlies: Eferding Formation

Lithology
- Primary: Claystone, mudstone

Location
- Coordinates: N 48° 12′ 22″; E 14° 13′ 27″
- Region: Upper Austria
- Country: Austria

Type section
- Named for: Ebelsberg
- Ebelsberg Formation (Austria)

The Ebelsberg Formation is a geologic formation in Austria. The section exposed near the town of Pucking are considered to be a Konservat-Lagerstätte. It preserves fossils dated to the Aquitanian age of the Miocene epoch.

== History of study ==
The marine deposits of the Ebelsberg Formation near Pucking were exposed in the 1980s when a hydroelectric power plant was built across the river Traun close to Linz, the capital of Upper Austria. Initial studies considered the Ebelsberg Formation to be Oligocene in age, specifically dating it to the Chattian (Late Oligocene). However, more recent studies have shown this to be false, instead proposing a younger age corresponding with the Aquitanian stage of the Miocene. Locally, this would correspond to the Upper Egerian, making the outcrops about 22 million years old.

== Environment ==
During the Aquitanian this part of Austria was covered by the extensive Paratethys sea, with the Ebelsberg Formation specifically having been formed in the outer neritic zone.

== Fauna ==
Color key
Taxon	Reclassified taxon	Taxon falsely reported as present	Dubious taxon or junior synonym	Ichnotaxon	Ootaxon	Morphotaxon

Notes
Uncertain or tentative taxa are in small text; ~~crossed out~~ taxa are discredited.

=== Bivalves ===
Name	Species	Locality/Member	Material	Notes	Image
Deletopecten	D. sp.	Pucking		A small pectinid bivalve.	
Isognomonidae		Pucking		A type of clam typically associated with driftwood.	
Megaxinus	M. bellardianus	Pucking		A lucinid bivalve. They were found in association with the remains of Austromola.	
Nucula	N. sp.	Pucking		A nuculid bivalve.	
Perna	P. aquitanica	Pucking		A species of mussle typically associated with driftwood.	
Teredinidae		Pucking		Pieces of lignite at Pucking are often found often completely penetrated by shipworms.	

=== Gastropods ===
Name	Species	Locality/Member	Material	Notes	Image
Clio	C. sp.	Pucking		A pelagic pteropod snail known from mass accumulations. They are diel migrants that use mucous web to capture prey. Blooms of Clio may have been caused by nutrient increases from intensified upswellings or increased coastal runoff.	
Euspira	E. helicina	Pucking		A member of the Naticidae, Euspira helicina is among the predominant gastropods at Pucking.	
Limacina	L. sp.	Pucking		A pelagic pteropod snail known from mass accumulations. They are diel migrants that use mucous web to capture prey. Blooms of Limacina may have been caused by nutrient increases from intensified upswellings or increased coastal runoff.	
Turridae		Pucking		A single species of turrid is among the predominant gastropods at Pucking.	

=== Cephalopods ===
Name	Species	Locality/Member	Material	Notes	Image
Aturia	Possibly a new species	Pucking		A nautiloid with a shall that is distinctly larger than that of Aturia aturi. Fossils are known from mass occurrences and always associated with brown algae. A deep water animal, its possible that remains of the Ebelsberg Aturia first drifted into coastal waters before being washed back out offshore where they were preserved.	

=== Crustaceans ===
Name	Species	Locality/Member	Material	Notes	Image
Lepadidae	Two undescribed species	Pucking		Barnacles that appear attached to driftwood.	

=== Echinoderms ===
Name	Species	Locality/Member	Material	Notes	Image
Linthia	L. summesbergeri	Pucking		A type of sea urchin, only a few specimen have been recovered from Pucking.	
Spatangoida		Pucking		A type of heart urchin, echinoderms are rare at Pucking.	

=== Chondrichthyes ===
Name	Species	Locality/Member	Material	Notes	Image
Alopias	A. exigua	Pucking, Wallern		A thresher shark of the family Alopiidae.	
Araloselachus	A. cuspidatus	Pucking		A sand shark of the family Odontaspididae.	
Dracipinna	D. bracheri	Wallern	Teeth	A squaliform shark of the family Dalatiidae, the kitefin sharks. It was previously known as Bracheria wallerniensis.	
Carcharias	C. acutissimus	Pucking		A species of sand tiger shark.	
Galeocerdo	G. aduncus	Pucking		A species of tigershark.	
Heptranchias	H. sp.	Pucking		A hexanchiform shark of the family Hexanchidae. Modern members of this genus are benthic animals that live close to the shelf edge at depths of around 400–1000 m.	
Etmopterus		Wallern, Pucking, Finklham/Graben		A squaliform shark of the family Etmopteridae, the lantern sharks.	
Iago	I. sp.	Wallern		A species of hound shark.	
Echinorhinus	E. pollerspoecki	Pucking		A echinorhiniform shark of the family Echinorhinidae, the bramble sharks. It would have inhabited the deep watter bottom shelf.	
Keasius	K. sp.	Traunpucking		An extinct relative of the basking shark.	
Palaeocentroscymnus	P. horvathi	Wallern, Pucking, Finklham/Graben	Teeth	A squaliform shark of the family Somniosidae, the sleeper sharks.	

=== Actinopterygii ===
Name	Species	Locality/Member	Material	Notes	Image
Aglyptorhynchus	A. sp.	Pucking		An extinct genus of billfish.	
Argyropelecus	A. sp.	Pucking		A species of hatchetfish, a bathypelagic animal.	
Austromola	A. angerhoferi	Pucking	Three specimen and skeleton parts, one of which was destroyed during excavation.	A large member of the Sunfish family, measuring up to 4 meters from fin tip to fin tip.	
Caproidae		Pucking		Boarfish are distinctly less frequent than mackerel, herring and hakes.	
Carangidae		Pucking		Jack fish are distinctly less frequent than mackerel, herring and hakes.	
Clupeidae		Pucking		Herring are amongst the most common fish at Pucking. Modern members of the family are schooling animals of the pelagic zone.	
Istiophoridae		Pucking	Three specimen including a set of caudal vertebrae.	The oldest known record of the family from the Northern Alpine Foreland Basin and one of the earliest records of the group in general after their appearance in the Chandler Bridge Formation.	
Merlucciidae		Pucking		Modern hake are benthic animals that occur between a few tens to a few hundreds of meters and migrate up the water column at night to feed. This fits with the offshore environment inferred for the Pucking Lagerstätte. They are common at Pucking.	
Myctophidae		Pucking		Lanternfish are regarded as index taxa for deep waters and live a bathypelagic lifestyle, migrating up the water column at night.	
Serranidae		Pucking		Comber are distinctly less frequent than mackerel, herring and hakes.	
Scombridae		Pucking		Mackerels are open water filter feeders. They are common at Pucking.	
Syngnathidae		Pucking		Pipefish are known from mass occurrences at Pucking, but likely did not originate in the offshore environment. Modern pipefish prefer bays and lagoons, thus it is possible that they were washed out to sea after their deaths.	
Xiphiidae		Pucking	One undescribed specimen.	An underscribed swordfish.	

=== Birds ===
Name	Species	Locality/Member	Material	Notes	Image
Petralca	P. austriaca	Pucking	A partial skeleton	Originally thought to be a species of auk, later studies have shown it to be an early species of loon.	

=== Mammals ===
Name	Species	Locality/Member	Material	Notes	Image
undescribed dolphin		Pucking	A well preserved skeleton preserving the skull, forelimbs, ribcage and much of the vertebral column.		
Romaleodelphis	R. pollerspoecki	Pucking	An incomplete skull missing the tip of the rostrum and most of the basicranium. Ribs and vertebrae have also been reported, but were split among collectors with their current whereabouts unknown.	A basal odontocete and member of the "Chilcacetus-Clade", making it basal to true dolphins and beaked whales.	

== See also ==
- List of fossiliferous stratigraphic units in Austria
