= Ranzania =

Ranzania may refer to:

- Ranzania (fish), a genus of fish in the family Molidae with several fossil species and one extant species
  - Ranzania laevis, the slender sunfish, the only extant species in the fish genus
- Ranzania (plant), a genus of plants in the family Berberidaceae

The genus Ranzania Bertoloni, 1855 (in the beetle family Scarabaeidae) is now called Rhamphorrhina Klug, 1855.
