= Mola pileata =

Mola pileata Temporal range: Middle Miocene–Late Miocene

Scientific classification
- Domain: Eukaryota
- Kingdom: Animalia
- Phylum: Chordata
- Class: Actinopterygii
- Order: Tetraodontiformes
- Family: Molidae
- Genus: Mola
- Species: †M. pileata

Binomial name
- †Mola pileata Van Beneden, 1881

Extinct species of fish

Mola pileata is an extinct species of sunfish that lived during the Middle and Late Miocene periods. The type specimen was found near Brussels.

== See also ==
- Austromola angerhoferi
- Eomola bimaxillaria
