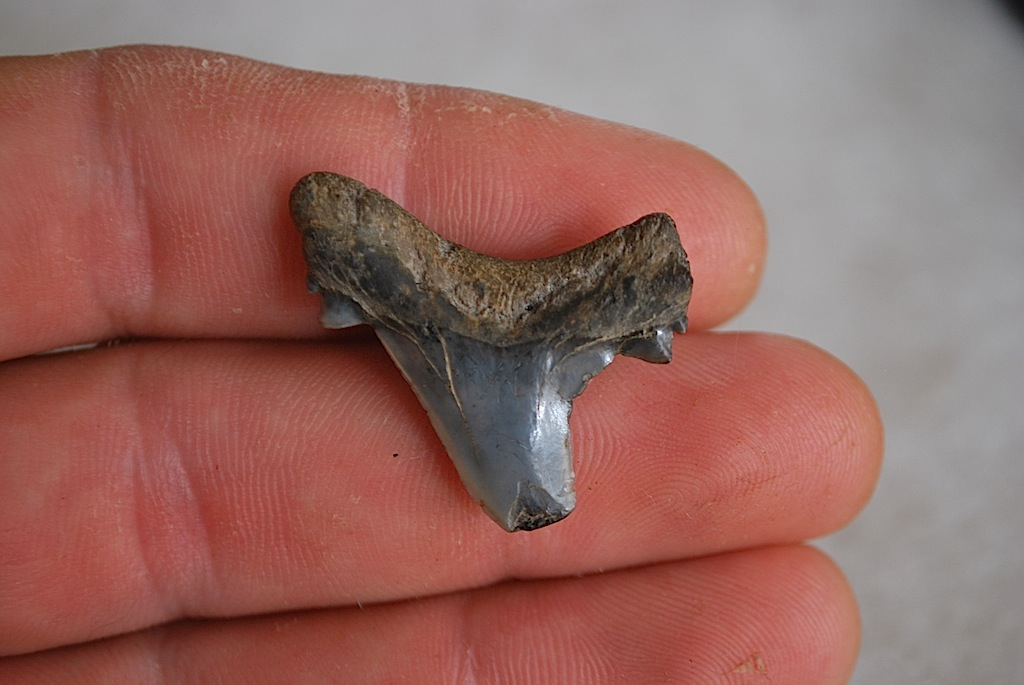
- Lateral tooth of Trigonotodus alteri

Scientific classification
- Kingdom: Animalia
- Phylum: Chordata
- Class: Chondrichthyes
- Subclass: Elasmobranchii
- Division: Selachii
- Order: Lamniformes
- Family: Alopiidae
- Genus: †Trigonotodus; Kozlov, 1999

Type species
- †Trigonotodus tusbairicus (Kozlov, 1999)

Other species
- †T. aktulgaicus? Kozlov, 1999 (nomen nudum); †T. alteri (Kozlov, 2001); †T. grandis? Leriche, 1942; †T. palatasi? Kent & Ward, 2018

= Trigonotodus =

Trigonotodus Temporal range: Late Eocene-Middle Miocene 35–13.7 Ma

Genus of sharls

Trigonotodus is an extinct genus of sharks, most likely belonging to the family Alopiidae. This genus includes three extinct species, which span from the Late Eocene to the Middle Miocene. It was originally placed in the family Otodontidae, but subsequently found to have affinities with thresher sharks. This genus is sometimes considered part of the genus Alopias. It is currently only known from isolated teeth. Recent studies proposed a relation ship with Cretoxyrhinidae because of the similarity with Squalicorax and Cretoxyrhina in the case of T. grandis and T. palatasi, but the proposal was questioned and it was proposed that Trigonotodus be placed in incertae sedis.

== Species ==
Species within this genera include:

Species	Notes	Images	Ref.
Trigonotodus aktulgaicus	Known primarily from the early Eocene of Kazakhstan. It is extremely similar to T. tusbairicus, and if not synonymous is likely its ancestor. It is also sometimes spelled T. aktulagaicus. Some scientists regard it as a Nomen nudum, early eocene species being called Trigonotodus cf. T. tusbairicus.		
Trigonotodus tusbairicus	Known primarily from the middle Eocene of Kazakhstan. It is similar to other early threshers such as A. hermani and A. latidens in terms of size and robustness but has lateral cusplets. It is the type species of Trigonotodus.	Trigonotodus tusbairicus from the Middle Eocene of Kazakhstan	
Trigonotodus alteri	Known primarily from the late Oligocene of South Carolina (Ashley Marl and Chandler Bridge Formations). It is commonly known as the Cusped Giant Thresher. May have one or two lateral cusplets. It is much larger than the other two.	Trigonotodus alteri lateral tooth (Oligocene, Chandler Bridge FM, SC)	

Others species such as Alopias grandis and A. palatasi are now also placed in this genus.
