= Mycteriacetus =

Mycteriacetus Temporal range: Burdigalian, ~18.78 Ma

Scientific classification
- Domain: Eukaryota
- Kingdom: Animalia
- Phylum: Chordata
- Class: Mammalia
- Order: Artiodactyla
- Infraorder: Cetacea
- Family: †Eurhinodelphinidae
- Genus: †Mycteriacetus; Lambert, 2004

Type species
- †Mycteriacetus bellunensis (Pilleri, 1985)

Extinct cetacean of the Early Miocene

Mycteriacetus is an extinct genus of dolphin from the Early Miocene (Burdigalian) of northeastern Italy. The type species is M. bellunensis.

== Etymology ==
Mycteriacetus is named after the Yellow-billed stork (Mycteria ibis) because the bill of that species is as long as the rostrum of Mycteriacetus.

== Taxonomy ==
Mycteriacetus bellunensis was originally named as a new species of Eurhinodelphis, E. bellunensis, by Pilleri (1985). However, Bianucci and Landini (2002) transferred this species to Argyrocetus, creating the new combination A. bellunensis. Lambert (2004) eventually recognized E. bellunensis as sufficiently distinct from Eurhinodelphis and Argyrocetus to warrant a new genus, Mycteriacetus.
