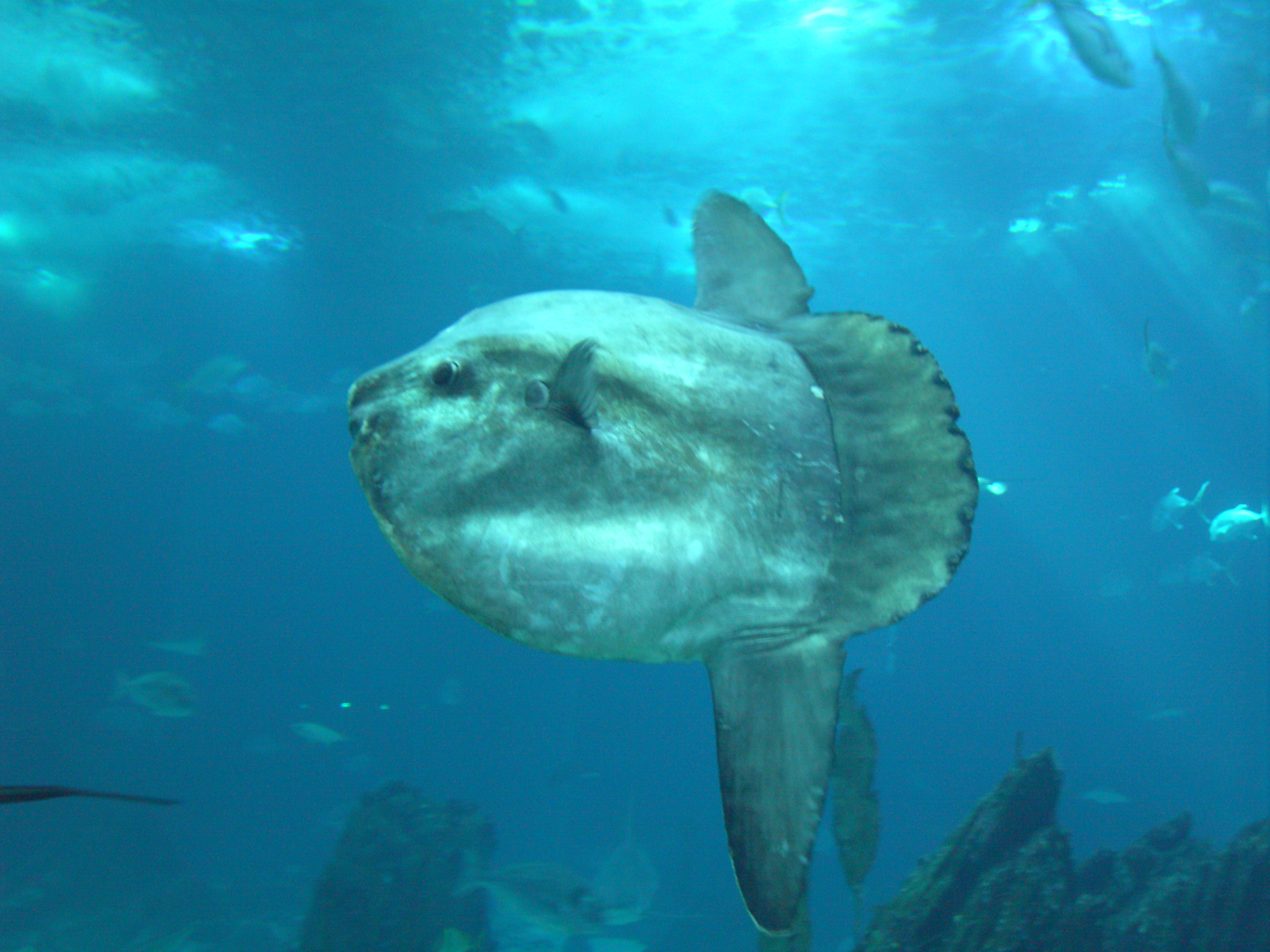
- Mola mola

Scientific classification
- Kingdom: Animalia
- Phylum: Chordata
- Class: Actinopterygii
- Division: Teleostei
- Order: Tetraodontiformes
- Suborder: Tetraodontoidei
- Family: Molidae; Bonaparte, 1832

Genera
- Masturus; Mola; Ranzania; †Austromola; †Eomola

= Molidae =

Molidae Temporal range: Mid/Late Eocene to present

Family of fishes

The Molidae comprise the family of the molas or ocean sunfishes, unusual fish whose bodies come to an end just behind the dorsal and anal fins, giving them a "half-fish" appearance. They are also the largest of the extant ray-finned bony fish, with the southern sunfish, Mola alexandrini, recorded at 4.6 m (15 ft) in length and 2,744 kg (6,049 lb) in weight.

The family name comes from the ocean sunfish's scientific name Mola mola, with its tautonymous name originating from the Latin word mola for "millstone" because of its circular shape.

== Description ==
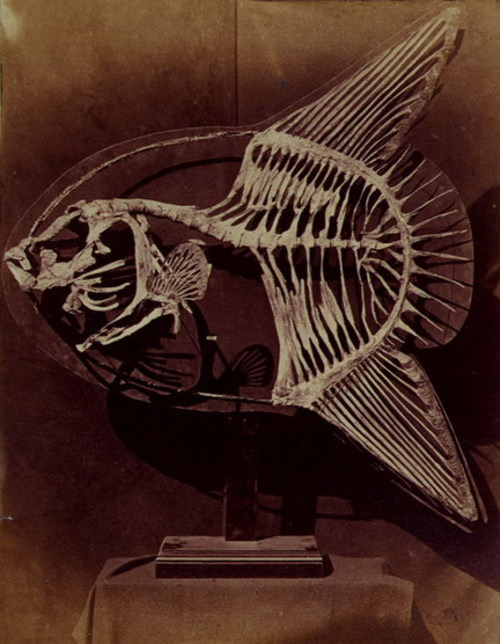
Sunfish skeleton photographed by Lewis Carroll

Molidae have the fewest vertebrae of any fish, with only 16 in Mola mola. The axial musculature, caudal and pelvic fins are completely lost during development, and most of their skeleton is made of cartilage. They also lack swim bladders. No bony plates occur in the skin, which is, however, thick and dense like cartilage and is fairly rough. Under the skin there is a stiff and gelatinous layer consisting of 89.8% water with a collagen and elastin meshwork, acting like an exoskeleton. Due to its greasy texture, it may also contain lipids. This layer, which is horizontally separated by a septum, provides the fish with buoyancy, and makes up a larger part of the animal's total mass the bigger the individual is.

Molids mostly swim by using their anal and dorsal fins (balistiform locomotion); the pectoral fins are likely mainly stabilizers. To steer, they squirt a strong jet of water out of their mouths or gills. They can also make minor adjustments in the orientation of the anal fin or the dorsal fin so as to control the amount of force it produces and the angle at which the force is produced. In this respect, they use their fins much like a bird uses its wings.

Molids are said to be able to produce sound by grinding their pharyngeal teeth, which are long and claw-like. Typical of a member of Tetraodontiformes, their teeth are fused into a beak-like structure, and its structure makes it impossible for them to close their mouths. Despite this, they feed mainly on soft-bodied animals, such as jellyfish and salps, although they also take small fish or crustaceans.

== Behavior ==
Molids have been filmed interacting with other species. Since molids are susceptible to several kinds of skin parasites, they make use of cleaner fish. A molid in need of cleaning will locate a patch of floating algae or flotsam that is home to halfmoons. The molid signals a readiness for cleaning by swimming almost vertically with its head near the surface of the water, and waits for the smaller cleaner fish to feed on the parasite worms. Similarly, the molid may break the surface of the water with its dorsal fin and beak to attract the attention of a gull or similar seabird. The seabird will then dig worms and other stubborn parasites out of the molid's skin.

== Fossil record ==
The known fossil history of Molidae extends back to the Eocene, with the genus Eomola containing the species E. bimaxillaria, known from the mid/late Eocene (Bartonian) of the North Caucasus. The fossil genus Austromola containing one species, A. angerhoferi Gregorova, Schultz, Harzhauser & Kroh, 2009, is known from the Lower Miocene Ebelsberg Formation near Pucking, Austria. This species was a resident of the Paratethys Sea and is estimated to have reached a length around 320 cm (130 in), making it the largest Cenozoic fossil teleost known.

At least one fossil species of Mola, M. pileata (van Beneden, 1881), is known from the Upper and Middle Miocene of Europe with a possible second species known from the Lower Miocene of North Carolina, United States. The genus Ranzania has five known fossil species: R. grahami Weems, 1985 and R. tenneyorum Weems, 1985, both from the Middle Miocene Calvert Formation of Virginia, USA; R. zappai Carnevale, 2007 from the Middle Miocene of Italy; R. ogaii Uyeno & Sakamoto, 1994 from the Middle Miocene of Japan; and an as yet unnamed species from the Upper Miocene of Algeria.

An Early Miocene-aged fossil molid beak (potentially of Ranzania) from the Gaiman Formation of Chubut, Argentina represents one of the southernmost known fossil records of tetraodontiform fish. Although it may have been a stray to the region (a vagrant), it is also possible that the warmer climate of the Miocene allowed molids to inhabit the seas that then covered Patagonia. In modern times, molids are only occasional strays to the region due to its cold climate.

== Species ==
Five extant species in three extant genera are recognized:

Species	Common name	Mass	Total length	Clavus (pseudo-tail) appearance	Shape of head and chin	Image
Mola mola (Linnaeus, 1758)	Ocean sunfish	2,300 kg (5,100 lb)	3.33 m (10.9 ft)	Scalloped	Less bumpy and less protruding	
Mola alexandrini (Giglioli, 1883)	Giant sunfish	2,744 kg (6,049 lb)	3.0 m (9.8 ft)	Rounded	Bumps on head and chin	
Mola tecta Nyegaard et al., 2017	Hoodwinker sunfish	1,870 kg (4,120 lb)	2.42 m (7 ft 11 in)	Rounded with medial indentation	No lumps and bumps on head and chin	
Masturus lanceolatus (É. Liénard, 1840)	Sharptail mola	2,000 kg (4,400 lb)	3.37 m (11.1 ft)	Pointed projection	Convex forehead	
Ranzania laevis (Pennant, 1776)	Slender sunfish	N/A	1.0 m (3 ft 3 in)	Slant and flat	Pointed and bump-less	

The following cladogram is based on a 2002 morphological study and its phylogenetic tree:

- Molidae
  - - Mola
    - Masturus
  - Ranzania
