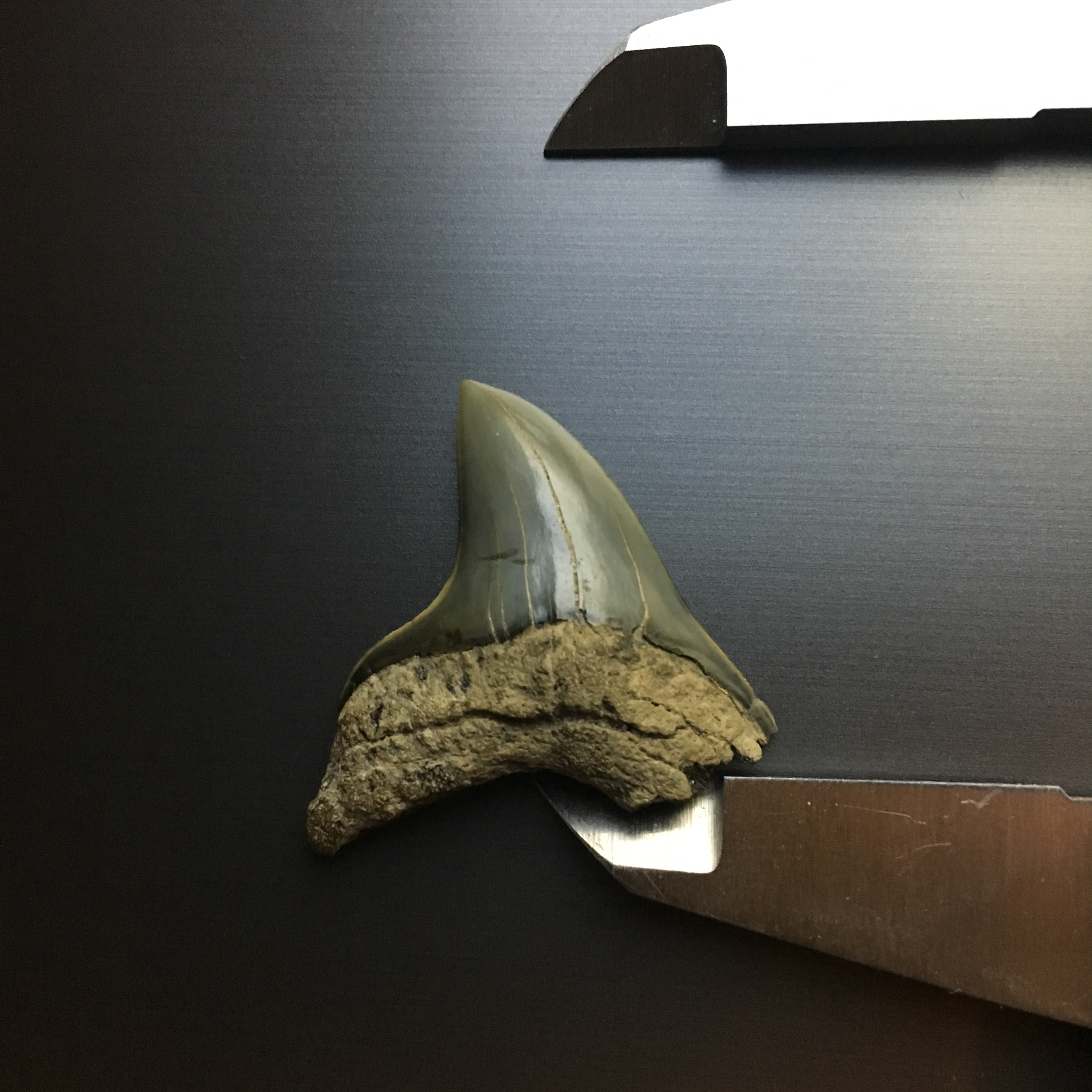
- Fossilized tooth

Scientific classification
- Kingdom: Animalia
- Phylum: Chordata
- Class: Chondrichthyes
- Subclass: Elasmobranchii
- Division: Selachii
- Order: Lamniformes
- Family: Alopiidae
- Genus: Alopias
- Species: A. grandis

Binomial name
- Alopias grandis Leriche, 1942

Synonyms
- Alopecias grandis (Leriche, 1942)

= Alopias grandis =

Alopias grandis Temporal range: Miocene

Giant, extinct thresher shark

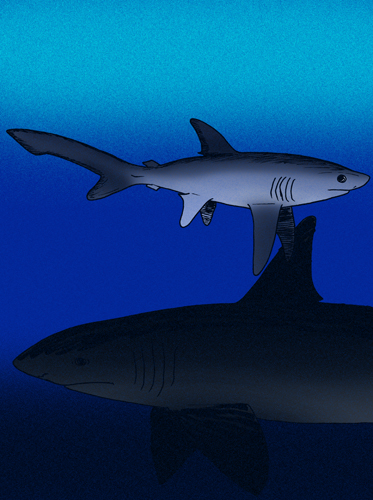
Reconstruction of A. grandis (top), with megalodon (bottom) for comparison

"Alopias" grandis is a species of giant thresher shark from the Miocene. Estimates calculated from teeth comparisons suggest the living animal was comparable in size to the extant great white shark. More recent studies replaced A. grandis into genus Trigonotodus.

== Description ==
It is unlikely it possessed the elongated tail lobe of modern thresher sharks. Some specimens in the Burdigalian show the beginnings of serrations, which are presumably transitional individuals between A. grandis and A. palatasi.

== Distribution ==
Remains generally consist of teeth, which have been found in the United States in the Calvert Formation of Virginia and Maryland, and in Beaufort County, South Carolina. They have also been found in the Miocene of Malta, as well as in southern Italy.
