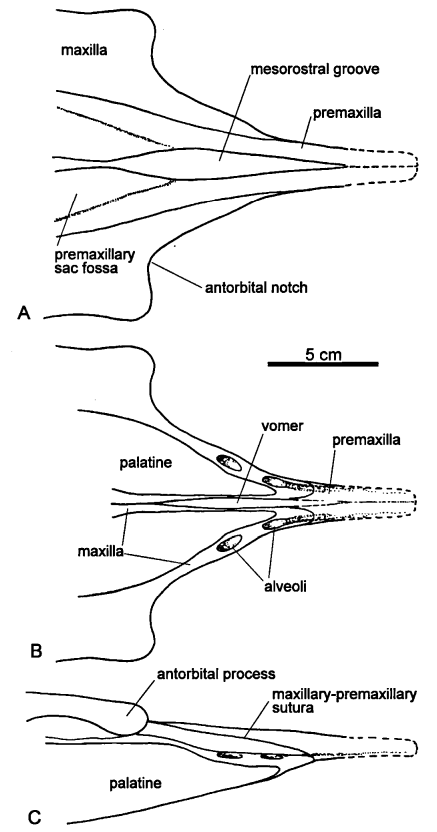
- A hypothetical reconstruction of the skull of V. trigonia.

Scientific classification
- Domain: Eukaryota
- Kingdom: Animalia
- Phylum: Chordata
- Class: Mammalia
- Order: Artiodactyla
- Suborder: Whippomorpha
- Infraorder: Cetacea
- Family: †Eurhinodelphinidae
- Genus: †Vanbreenia; Bianucci & Landini, 2002
- Species: †V. trigonia

Binomial name
- †Vanbreenia trigonia Bianucci & Landini, 2002

= Vanbreenia =

Extinct genus of toothed whale

Vanbreenia is an extinct genus of toothed whale from the Miocene epoch, containing only the species Vanbreenia trigonia. Its fossils have been found in the Miste area of Winterswijk in the Netherlands.

== Etymology ==
Vanbreenia was named after Dr. P.J.H. van Bree from the Zoological Museum Amsterdam. Its grammatical gender (in Latin) is feminine.

== Description ==
V. trigonia is small compared to other odontocete genera, and has a shorter rostrum as well, with a length of 90 millimeters, and a width and height of 95 and 47 millimeters and its base, respectively. Its shorter rostrum likely gave it swimming maneuverability to avoid predators and capture prey.
