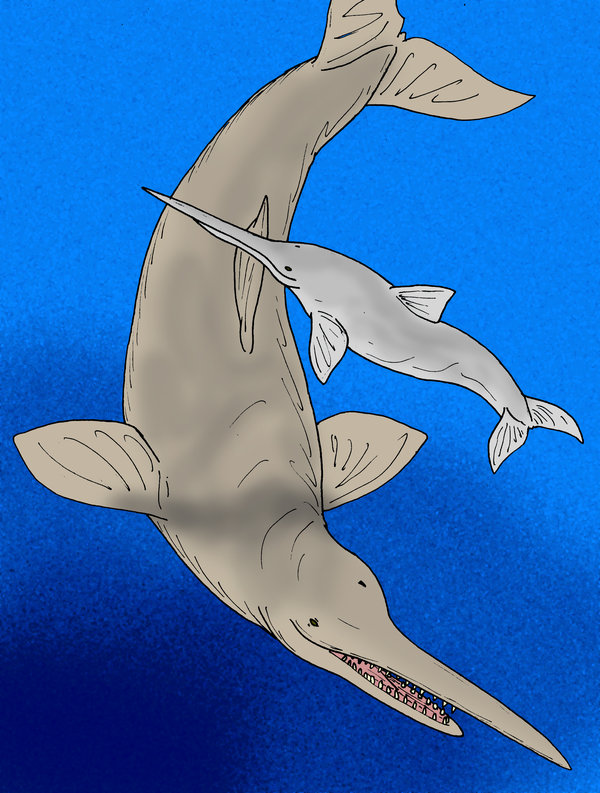
- Macrodelphinus and Eurhinodelphis.

Scientific classification
- Kingdom: Animalia
- Phylum: Chordata
- Class: Mammalia
- Infraclass: Placentalia
- Order: Artiodactyla
- Infraorder: Cetacea
- Family: †Eurhinodelphinidae
- Genus: †Macrodelphinus; Wilson 1935
- Species: †M. kelloggi

Binomial name
- †Macrodelphinus kelloggi Wilson 1935

= Macrodelphinus =

Macrodelphinus Temporal range: Early Miocene

Extinct genus of mammals

Macrodelphinus is an extinct genus of primitive odontocete known from Early Miocene marine deposits in California.

== Biology ==
Macrodelphinus was an orca-sized odontocete similar to members of Eurhinodelphinidae in having a swordfish-like rostrum and upper jaw. Because of its size, and inch-long teeth, it is believed to have been an apex predator.

== Classification ==
Macrodelphinus is known from a fragmentary skull from the Early Miocene Jewett Sand Formation of Kern County, southern California. Although often classified as a member of Eurhinodelphinidae, the cladistic analysis of Chilcacetus recovers it outside Eurhinodelphinidae, less advanced than Eoplatanista. The Miocene species "Champsodelphis" valenciennesii Brandt, 1873, based on a rostrum fragment from marine sediments in Landes, France, was assigned to Macrodelphinus by Kellogg (1944).
