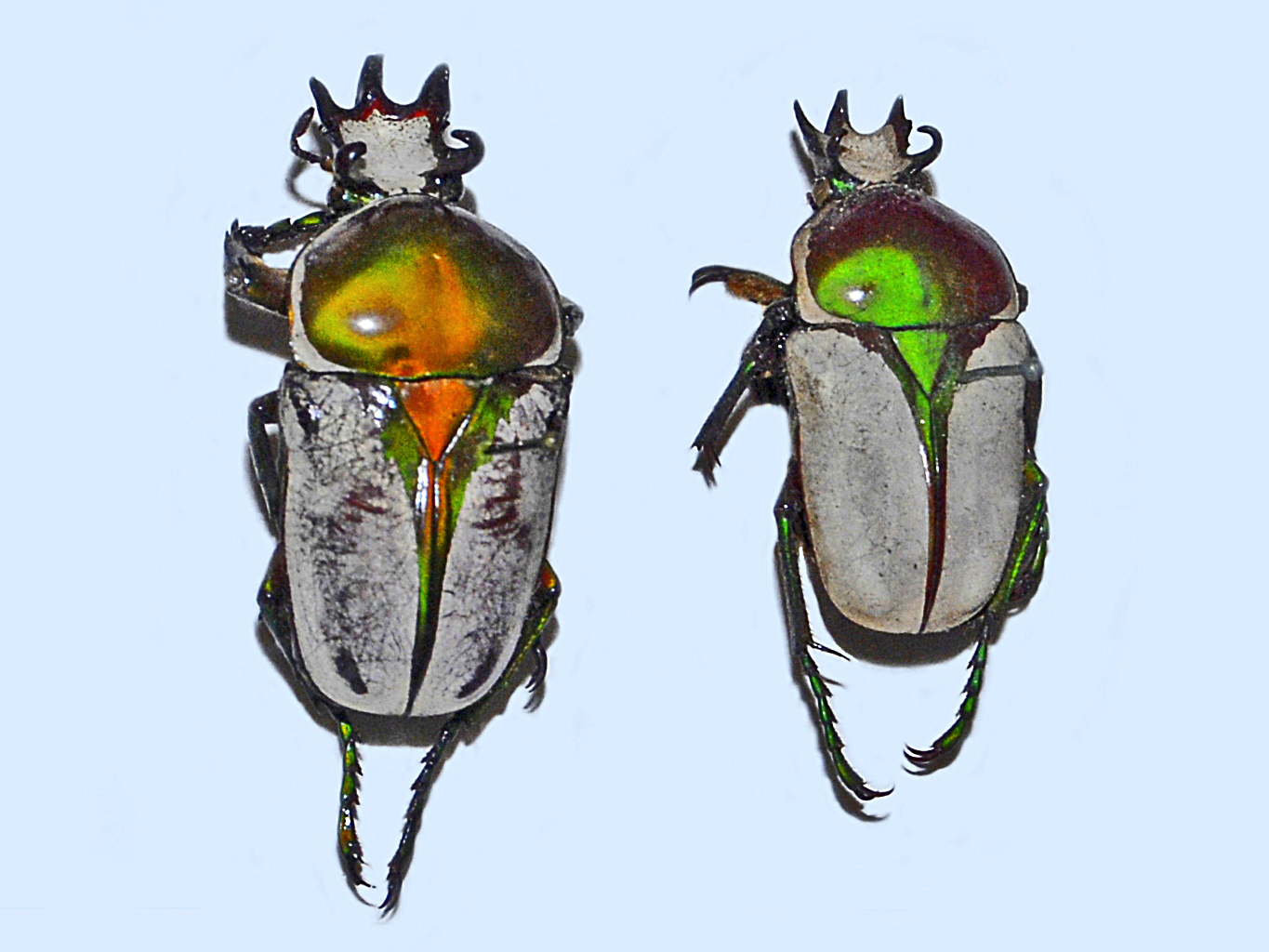
- Museum specimens

Scientific classification
- Kingdom: Animalia
- Phylum: Arthropoda
- Clade: Pancrustacea
- Class: Insecta
- Order: Coleoptera
- Suborder: Polyphaga
- Infraorder: Scarabaeiformia
- Family: Scarabaeidae
- Genus: Rhamphorrhina
- Species: R. bertolonii

Binomial name
- Rhamphorrhina bertolonii (H. Lucas, 1879)

Synonyms
- Ceratorrhina bertolonii H. Lucas, 1879; Ranzania bertolonii (H. Lucas, 1879); Taurhina bertolonii (H. Lucas, 1879)

= Rhamphorrhina bertolonii =

Species of beetle

Rhamphorrhina bertolonii is a beetle belonging to the family Scarabaeidae. The species was first described by Hippolyte Lucas in 1879.

== Description ==
Rhamphorrhina bertolonii can reach a length of about 20–40 millimetres (0.79–1.57 in). Basic color of the elytra is gray, while pronotum may be bright green or orange reddish.

== Distribution ==
This species can be found in Tanzania.

== Etymology ==
The name honours Giuseppe Bertoloni.
