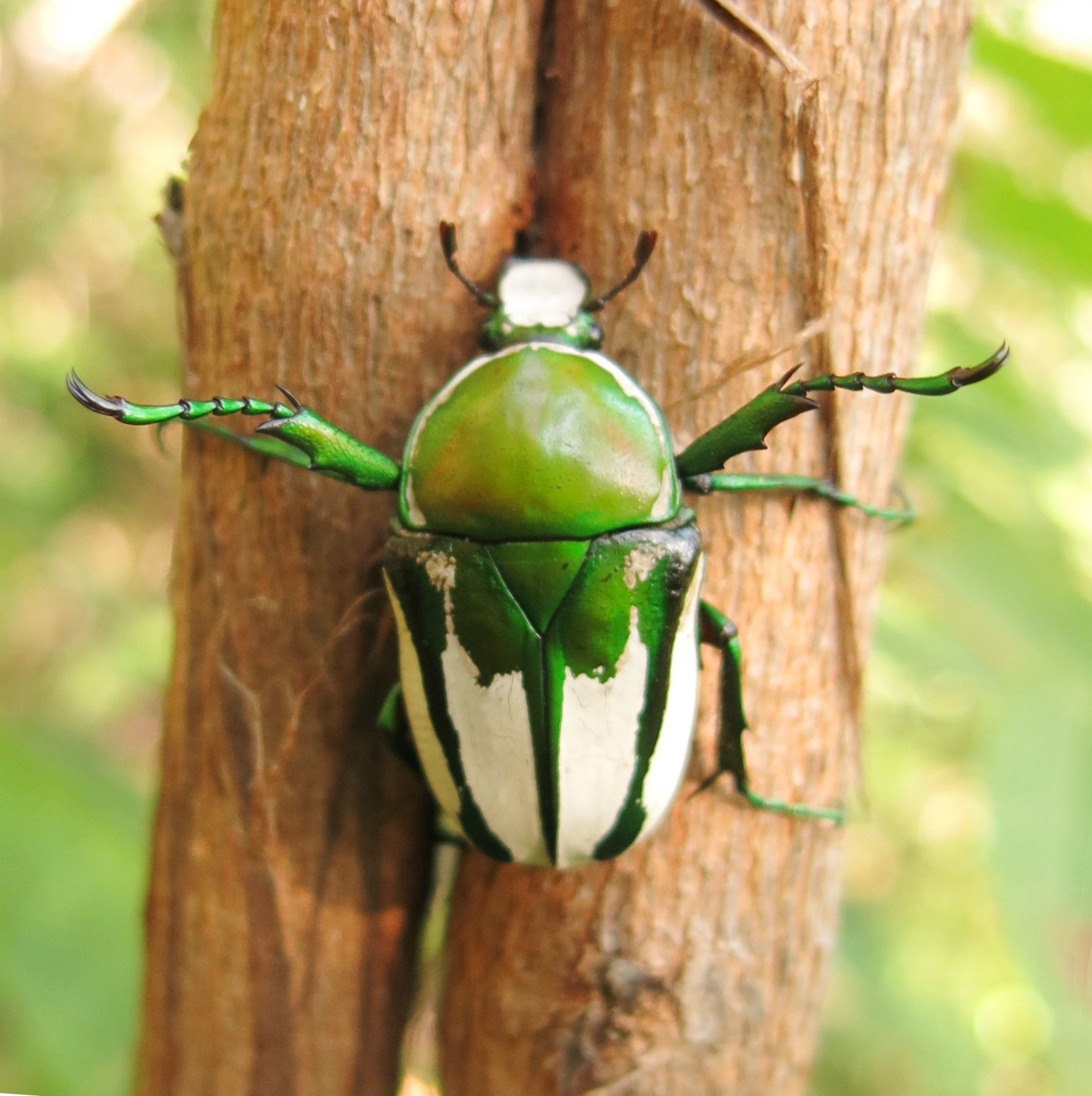

Scientific classification
- Kingdom: Animalia
- Phylum: Arthropoda
- Class: Insecta
- Order: Coleoptera
- Suborder: Polyphaga
- Infraorder: Scarabaeiformia
- Family: Scarabaeidae
- Genus: Rhamphorrhina
- Species: R. splendens

Binomial name
- Rhamphorrhina splendens (Bertoloni, 1855)

Synonyms
- Ranzania splendens Bertoloni, 1855; Taurhina splendens (Bertoloni, 1855)

= Rhamphorrhina splendens =

Species of beetle

Rhamphorrhina splendens, commonly known as the regal fruit chafer, is a large beetle of the family Scarabaeidae which can grow to 30mm long.
