= Ranzania grahami =

Ranzania grahami Temporal range: Middle Miocene

Scientific classification
- Domain: Eukaryota
- Kingdom: Animalia
- Phylum: Chordata
- Class: Actinopterygii
- Order: Tetraodontiformes
- Family: Molidae
- Genus: Ranzania
- Species: †R. grahami

Binomial name
- †Ranzania grahami Weems, 1985

Extinct species of fish

Ranzania grahami is an extinct fossil species of fish, that lived in Middle Miocene, in Calvert Formation, of Virginia state. 10 specimens of R. grahami were found, all in the same location in what is now Virginia. Fossil remains date from the Langhian to the Serravallian.
