= Austromola =

Austromola Temporal range: Early Miocene
- Life restoration

Scientific classification
- Kingdom: Animalia
- Phylum: Chordata
- Class: Actinopterygii
- Division: Teleostei
- Order: Tetraodontiformes
- Family: Molidae
- Genus: †Austromola; Gregorova et al., 2009
- Species: †A. angerhoferi

Binomial name
- †Austromola angerhoferi Gregorova et al., 2009

Extinct species of ocean sunfish

Austromola is an extinct genus of ocean sunfish. It contains a single species, A. angerhoferi, known from the Lower Miocene Ebelsberg Formation near Pucking, Austria. It is thought to be the sister taxon to Mola and Masturus.

This species was a resident of the Paratethys Sea and is estimated to have reached a length around 320 cm (130 in), and total height around 400 cm (160 in), making it among the largest Cenozoic fossil teleosts known. It has been described as "one of the most spectacular Cenozoic teleost fish" in terms of both size and preservation, as three individual articulated, partially complete specimens are known.
