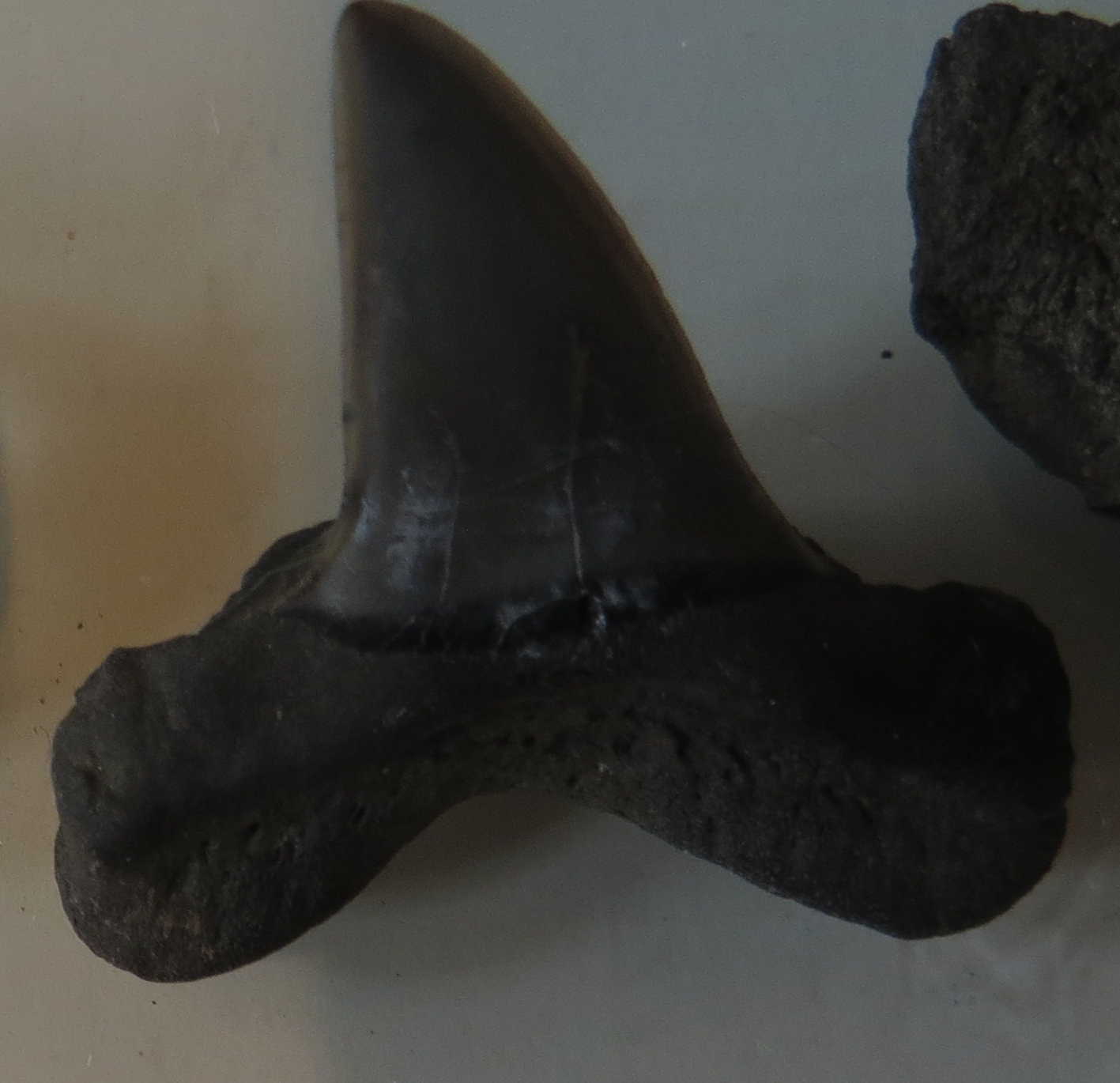
- Tooth of Anotodus retroflexus

Scientific classification
- Kingdom: Animalia
- Phylum: Chordata
- Class: Chondrichthyes
- Subclass: Elasmobranchii
- Division: Selachii
- Order: Lamniformes
- Family: Alopiidae
- Genus: †Anotodus; Le Hon, 1871
- Species: †A. retroflexus

Binomial name
- †Anotodus retroflexus (Agassiz, 1838)

Synonyms
- †Oxyrhina retroflexa Agassiz, 1838; †Isurus retroflexus (Agassiz, 1838); †Anotodus agassizii Le Hon, 1871

= Anotodus =

Anotodus Temporal range: Burdigalian-Zanclean

Extinct genus of sharks

Anotodus is an extinct genus of thresher sharks that lived during the Neogene. It contains one valid species, Anotodus retroflexus, which has been found in North America, South America, Europe, and Australia.

== Taxonomy ==
Oxyrhina retroflexa was named by Louis Agassiz in an 1838 illustration, which was followed by his text description in 1843. (Note: The publication dates are based on Brignon (2014).) Its holotype is a tooth of unknown provenance housed in the State Museum of Natural History, Karlsruhe. In 1871, Henri Le Hon named Anotodus agassizii for teeth from the Pliocene of Belgium, while acknowledging that it could be the same as O. retroflexa. The former species is now regarded as a junior synonym of the latter; while some authors consider it to belong to Isurus, it is more widely accepted as a distinct genus of alopiid.
