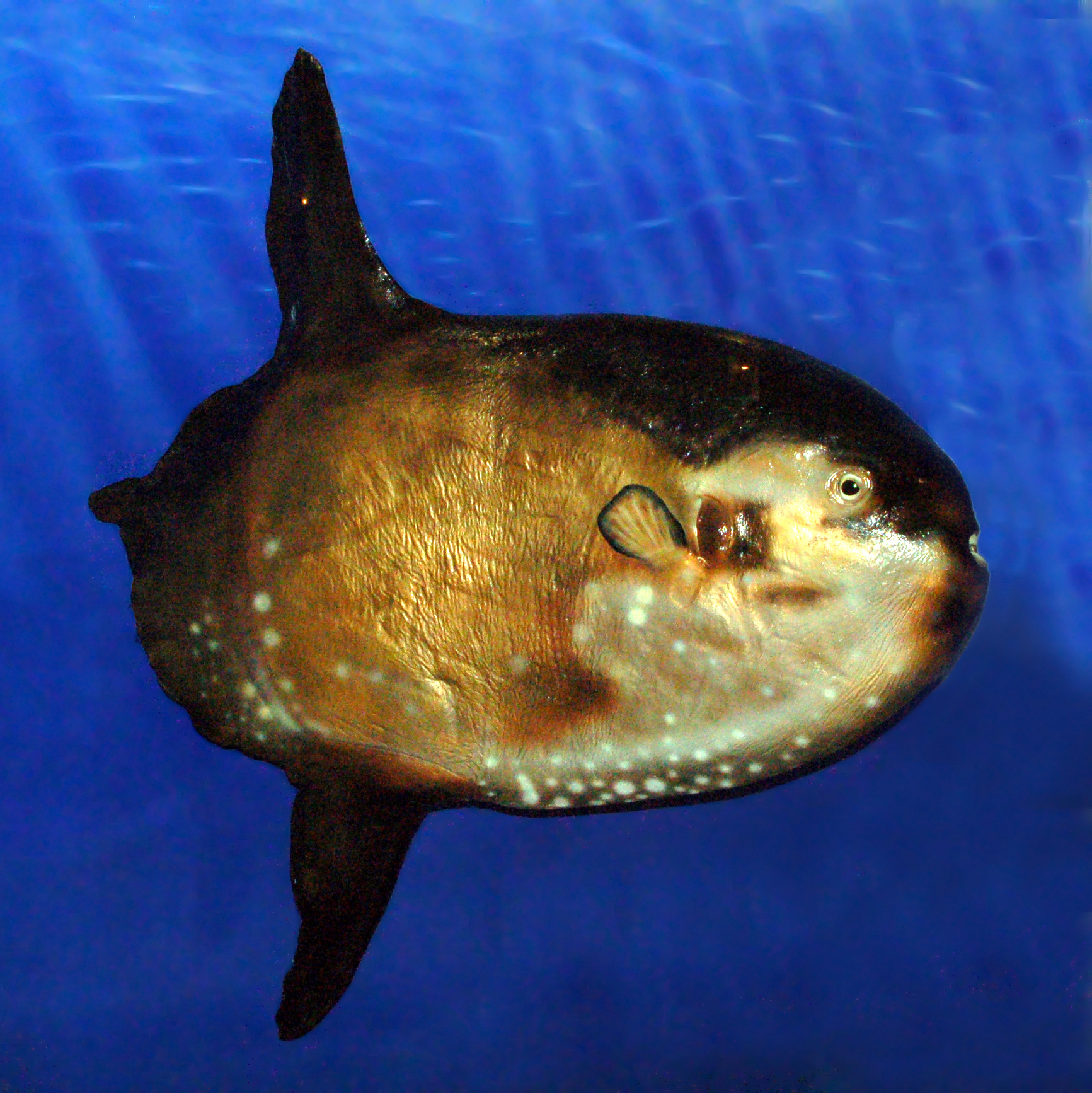
- Mounted specimen at the National Museum of Natural History and Science in Lisbon

Conservation status
- Least Concern (IUCN 3.1)

Scientific classification
- Kingdom: Animalia
- Phylum: Chordata
- Class: Actinopterygii
- Order: Tetraodontiformes
- Family: Molidae
- Genus: Masturus; T. N. Gill, 1884
- Species: M. lanceolatus

Binomial name
- Masturus lanceolatus (É. Liénard, 1840)

Synonyms
- List: Orthagoriscus lanceolatus Liénard, 1840; Masturus lanceolata (Liénard, 1840); Mola lanceolata (Liénard, 1840); Mola lanceolatus (Liénard, 1840); Orthagoriscus oxyuropterus Bleeker, 1873; Masturus oxyuropterus (Bleeker, 1873); Pseudomola lassarati Cadenat, 1959

= Sharptail mola =

Species of fish

The sharptail mola (Masturus lanceolatus) is a species of mola found circumglobally in tropical and temperate waters. It is similar in appearance to the ocean sunfish (Genus: Mola), but can be distinguished by the projection on its clavus (pseudo-tail). Other common names include sharpfin sunfish, point-tailed sunfish, and trunkfish.

Rarely encountered, very little is known of the biology or life history of the sharptail mola. It has recently become important to commercial fisheries operating off eastern Taiwan. This species is the only member of its genus.

== Distribution and habitat ==
The distribution of the sharptail mola is worldwide in tropical and temperate waters. They are primarily inhabitants of the epipelagic zone, but are rarely sighted at the surface, with many of those appearing to be ill and parasite-ridden. During the day, they spend most of their time at depths of 5–200 m (16–656 ft), preferring water temperatures above 20 °C, but making repeated dives into cooler, deeper water, possibly to feed or to avoid predators. At night, they spend most of their time between 100 and 250 m (330 and 820 ft). They have been sighted in the mesopelagic zone to a depth of 670 m (2,200 ft), but may descend to over 1,000 m (3,300 ft). One tagged individual in the Gulf of Mexico moved an average of 10 km (6.2 mi) a day.

== Description ==
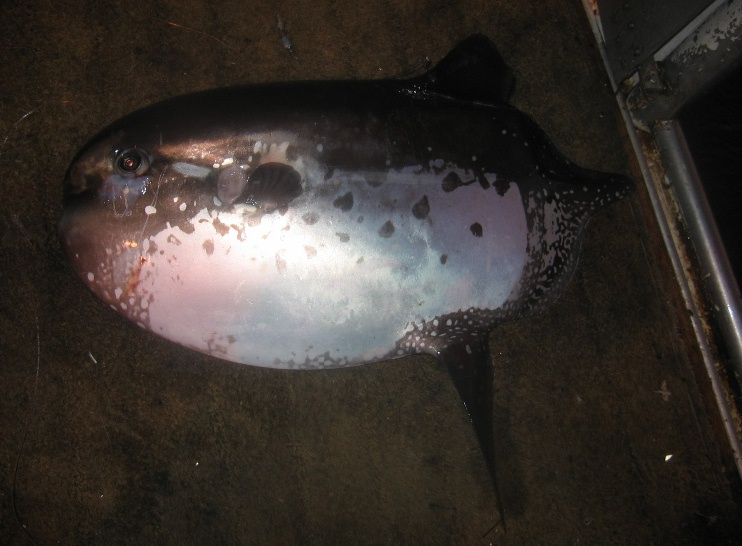
Masturus lanceolatus

One of the largest bony fishes, the sharptail mola can measure up to 3.4 m (11 ft) long and weigh 2,000 kg (4,400 lb). It has an oval body with an evenly convex forehead profile. The eyes are placed more forward on the head than in the genus Mola. The teeth in both jaws are fused into beak-like plates. The dorsal and anal fins are placed posteriorly, and the base of the dorsal fin is longer than that of the anal fin. In place of a caudal fin, the dorsal and anal fins merge into a clavus, formed by 18-20 fin rays. The central rays in the clavus are supported by the last vertebra and form an elongated triangular lobe; some authors believe these rays to be remnants of the larval caudal fin, though this is disputed.

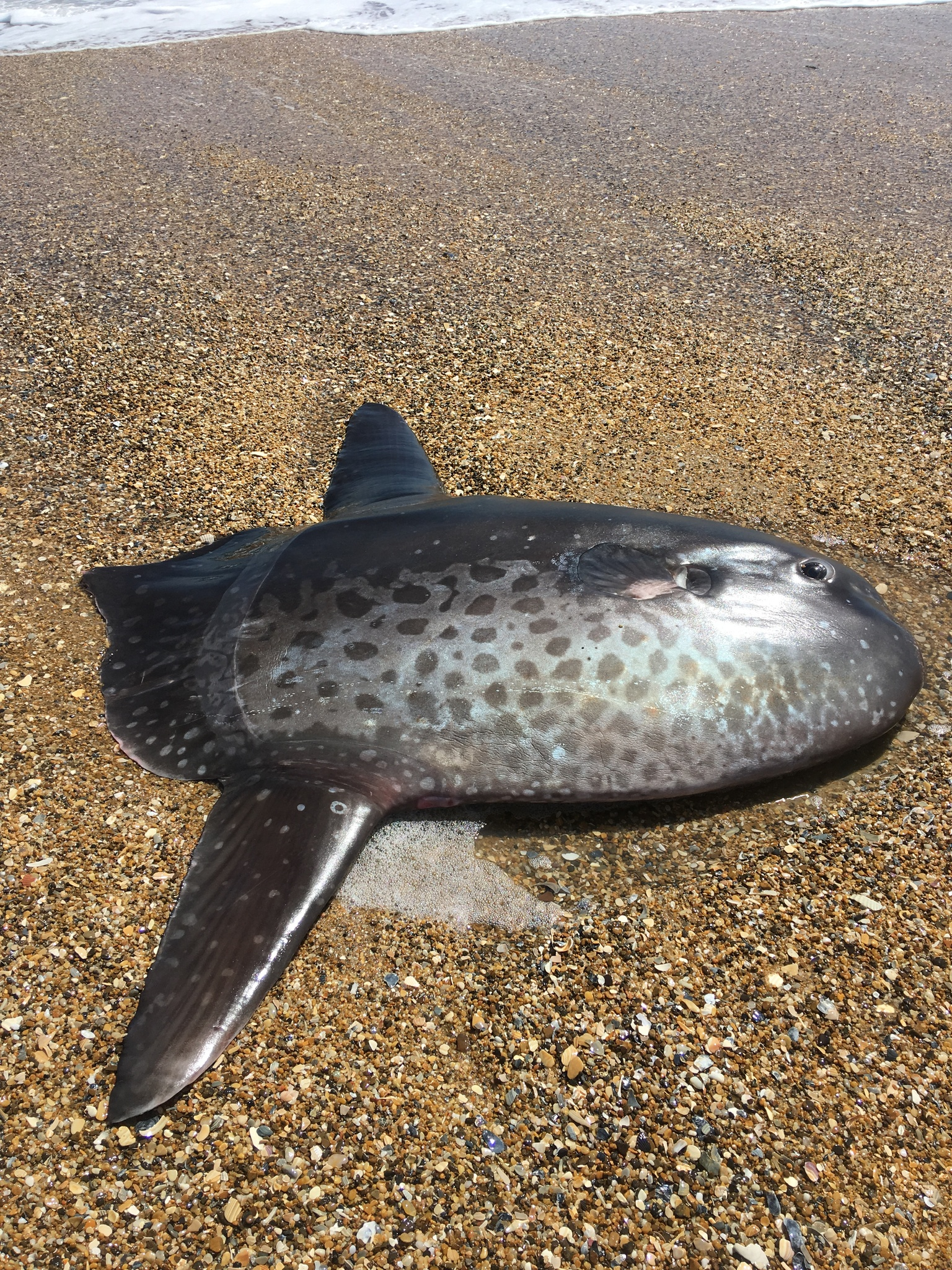
Showing dark ventral spots, in North Carolina

Their skin is covered with small dermal denticles that are finer than those of the ocean sunfish. Their coloration is silvery with the upper parts of the sides grayish brown to blackish. The sides may bear ill-defined dark spots. The dorsal and anal fins are slate gray, while the clavus may have pale blotches. This species is distinguished from the similar Masturus oxyuropterus by its prominent chin, the lack of a concavity above the eyes, and the unequal lengths of the dorsal and anal fin bases. These two forms may represent different sexes of the same species.

== Biology and ecology ==
Robert Collett, who examined some of the first known specimens of sharptail mola, speculated they might represent abnormal ocean sunfishes that had retained larval characteristics. However, the caudal projection is now known to be a secondary development that follows the loss of the primary tail. The swimming mode of the sharptail is similar to that of other ocean sunfishes, using sculling motions of its long dorsal and anal fins to propel itself through the water. The anal fin moves more extensively than the dorsal fin. The small pectoral fins move constantly to control pitch, while the clavus is employed as a rudder.

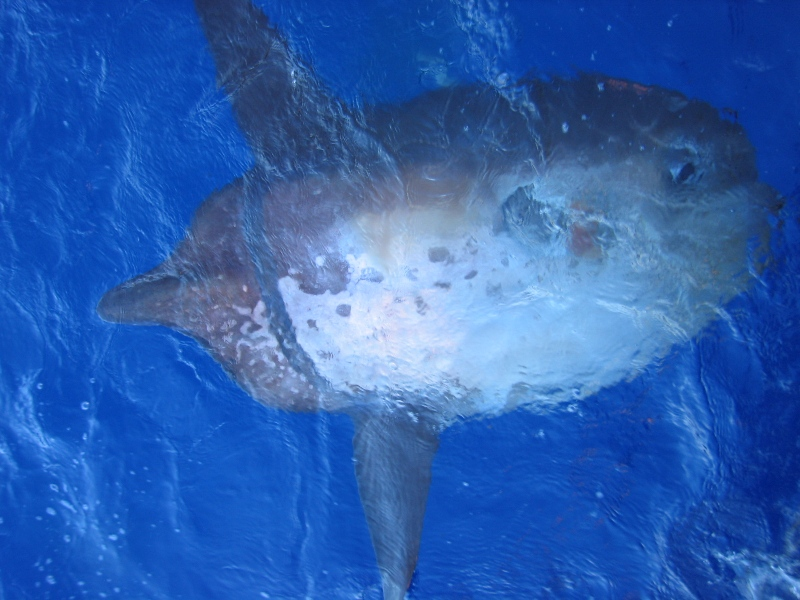
Sharptail mola near the surface

Juvenile sharptail molas are known to feed on benthic annelids and sponges. Adults likely feed on medusae, siphonophores, ctenophores, and salps, as well as some fishes, crustaceans, and molluscs. Sharptail molas sometimes have remoras attached to the surface of their bodies or inside their buccal cavities. In 1949, a sharptail mola off North Carolina was found with a common remora (Remora remora) wedged inside the gill arches on its right side. This evidently impaired the respiration of the mola, such that it foundered on the beach and was collected by fishermen.

Molas are oviparous and are amongst the most fecund of all fishes. Larval sharptail molas are rounded in shape and develop large pyramidal dermal spines over their bodies, which persist through a prejuvenile phase called the "Molacanthus" stage. In this stage, the body is deep and compressed, with a thin, keel-like structure below the abdominal region. This ridge is made from skin and covered with several rows of small spines. The skin is rough, being covered with small prickles. The spines eventually diminish in size and disappear, leaving scars obvious on the sides of young fish up to 70 mm (2.8 in) long. Their coloration is dark brown on the back, becoming very light on the sides and belly. The lifespan for this species is estimated to be 85 years for males and 105 years for females.

== Relationship to humans ==
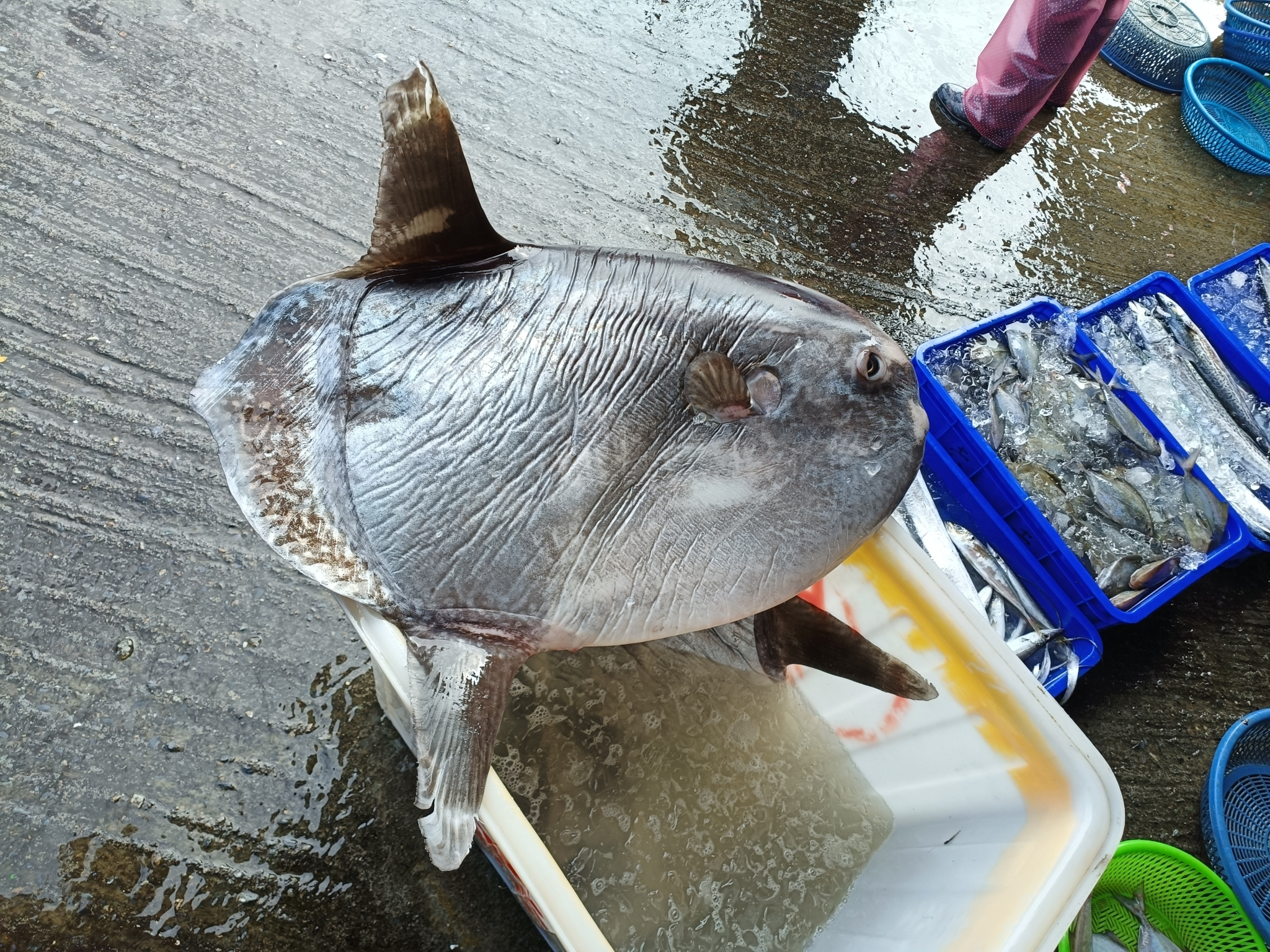
At a fishing port in Taiwan, in 2024

Since 2002, promotion of an ocean sunfish festival in Hualien County, Taiwan, has increased demand for the meat of the sunfish (called "mambo fish" after a public vote), whereas before only the intestines and reproductive organs were sold while the rest of the fish was discarded. The month-long April festival draws some 120,000 visitors, and features "101 ways to eat" sunfish. Consequently, catches of sunfishes off eastern Taiwan have risen sharply, with the sharptail mola comprising 90% of the catch. In 2005, 208 tonnes were landed and the annual sunfish catch was valued at US$ one million. The species is caught by set net, drift net, and longline fisheries. The impact of this increased exploitation on sunfish stocks is under investigation.
