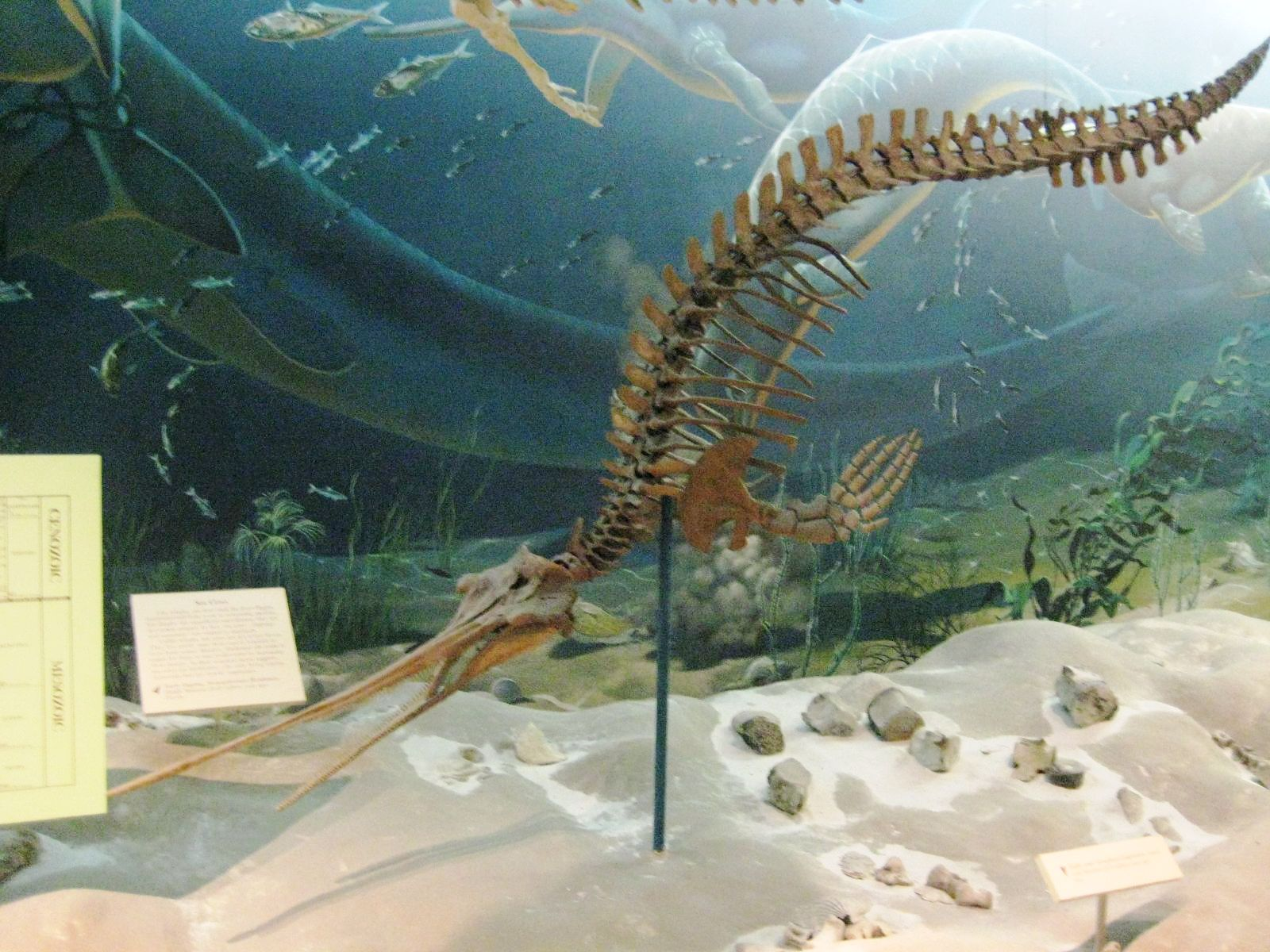
- Fossil X. bossi

Scientific classification
- Kingdom: Animalia
- Phylum: Chordata
- Class: Mammalia
- Order: Artiodactyla
- Infraorder: Cetacea
- Family: †Eurhinodelphinidae
- Genus: †Xiphiacetus; Lambert 2005

Species
- †X. bossi Kellogg 1925; †X. cristatus du Bus 1872

= Xiphiacetus =

Xiphiacetus Temporal range: Miocene, 20.43–7.246 Ma

Extinct genus of mammals

Xiphiacetus is an extinct genus of cetacean known from the Miocene (early Burdigalian to late Tortonian, 20.43 to 7.246 million years ago of Europe and the U.S. East Coast.

== Taxonomy and Naming ==
du Bus 1872 described Priscodelphinus cristatus based on partial and poorly preserved skulls with extremely long and narrow rostra with a huge number of densely packed teeth. He estimated the rostrum of a large specimen to be 90 cm (35 in) long and the cranium to be 20 cm (7.9 in) long and slightly wider. He also found a series of well-preserved cervicals and a few of the anterior-most thoracics.

Kellogg 1925 described Eurhindelphis bossi based on an almost complete skull missing ear bones, both mandibles, sixteen vertebrae, ten ribs, an incomplete scapula, a humerus, and a partial sternum. Kellogg named his species after its discoverer, Norman H. Boss, who had discovered the type specimen in 1918. Kellogg also described several other fossils.

Lambert 2005 recombined these two taxa and placed them under the generic name Xiphiacetus.
