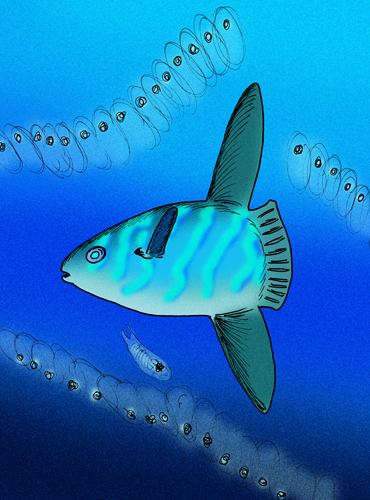

Scientific classification
- Kingdom: Animalia
- Phylum: Chordata
- Class: Actinopterygii
- Order: Tetraodontiformes
- Family: Molidae
- Genus: †Eomola; Tyler & Bannikov, 1992
- Species: †E. bimaxillaria

Binomial name
- †Eomola bimaxillaria Tyler & Bannikov, 1992

= Eomola =

Eomola Temporal range: Middle Eocene (Bartonian)

Extinct genus of fishes

Eomola is an extinct genus of ocean sunfish that inhabited the northeastern Tethys Ocean during the Eocene. It contains a single species, E. bimaxillaria from the Bartonian-aged Kuma Formation of Krasnodar Krai, Russia.

It is one of the earliest fossil ocean sunfishes known, and differs from all other molids by the structure of its jaws, in that its premaxillae are unfused, unlike all other known molids. The genus Eomola was described in 1992 by James Tyler and Alexandre Bannikov.
