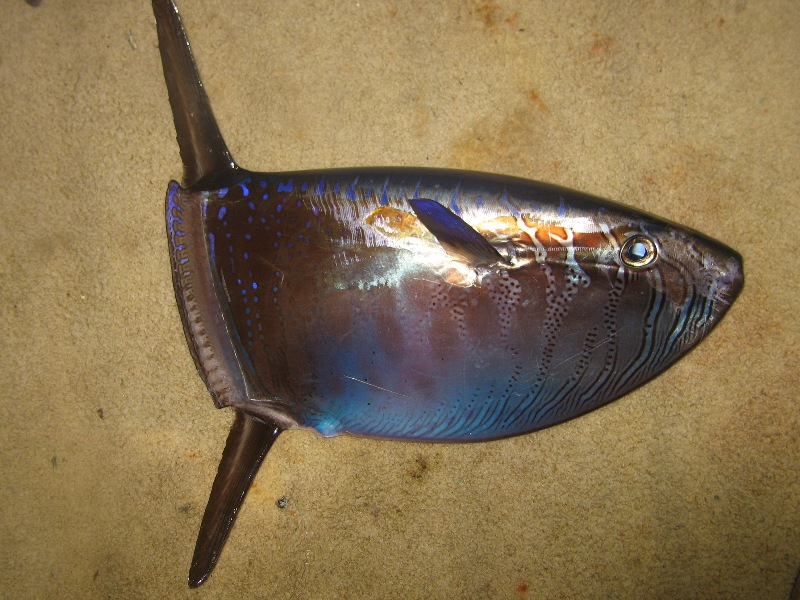

Conservation status
- Least Concern (IUCN 3.1)

Scientific classification
- Kingdom: Animalia
- Phylum: Chordata
- Class: Actinopterygii
- Division: Teleostei
- Order: Tetraodontiformes
- Family: Molidae
- Genus: Ranzania; Nardo, 1840
- Species: R. laevis

Binomial name
- Ranzania laevis (Pennant, 1776)

= Slender sunfish =

Slender sunfish Temporal range: Early Miocene to present

Species of fish

The slender sunfish (Ranzania laevis) is a mola of the family Molidae, the only extant member of the genus Ranzania, found globally in tropical and temperate seas. Its length is up to 1 m (3.3 ft). Several stranding and mass stranding events have occurred on beaches near Albany, Western Australia.

The first South Australian specimen was found at Aldinga in 1944. A cast was made from it, and a replica was made, painted and prepared for display at the South Australian museum that year. Several other individuals have stranded in South Australia at Port Willunga, Netley and West Beach with the latter successfully returned live to deeper water.

In contrast to its much larger relatives in the family Molidae, who are very slow-moving and feed almost exclusively upon jellyfish, salps, and small fish and crustaceans, analysis of stomach contents show that the slender sunfish also consumes squid, particularly of the family Ommastrephidae, which are known for being very fast-moving, displaying evidence that the slender sunfish itself is a faster-moving and agile predator of squid. Unlike its relatives, which possess dull, rough skin, the slender sunfish displays brilliant, silvery hexagonal scales across its body which are smooth to the touch.

Several other fossil species of Ranzania are known:

- †Ranzania grahami Weems, 1985 - Middle Miocene (Langhian/Serravallian) of Virginia, USA
- †Ranzania ogaii Uyeno & Sakamoto, 1994 - Middle Miocene (Langhian) of Saitama, Japan
- †Ranzania tenneyorum Weems, 1985 - Early Miocene (Burdigalian) of Virginia, USA
- †Ranzania zappai Carnevale, 2007 - Middle Miocene (Serravallian) of Italy (named for Frank Zappa)

In addition, a partial fossil of an indeterminate Ranzania is known from the latest Miocene (Messinian) of Algeria. An indeterminate Early Miocene-aged molid, known from a single fossil beak from the Gaiman Formation of Chubut, Argentina, may also be that of Ranzania; this fossil is notable for representing the southernmost record of fossil Tetraodontiformes. During the warmer climate of the Miocene, the now-frigid coast of Chubut may have been more hospitable for pelagic molids like Ranzania.

== Gallery ==
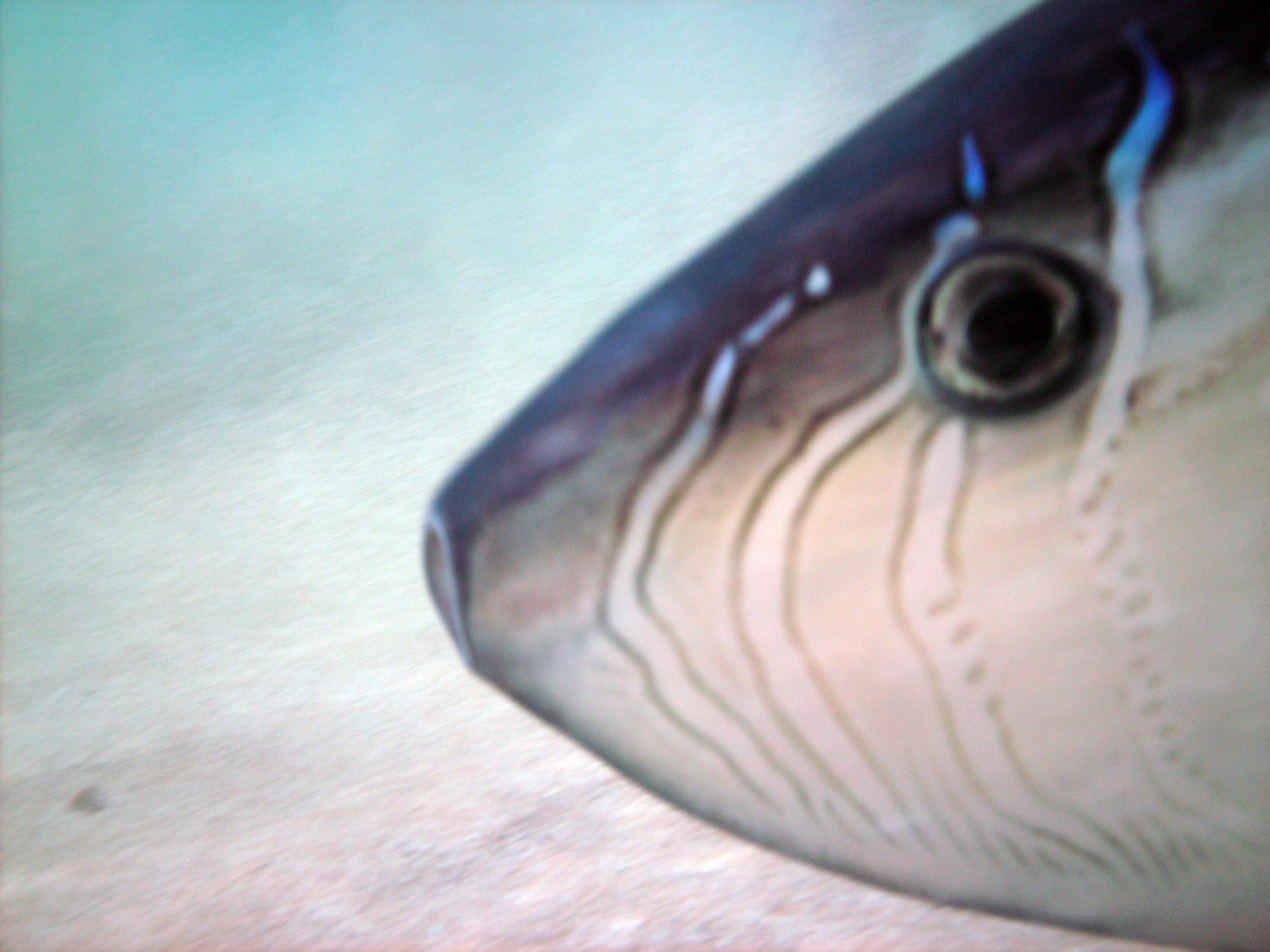
Close-up of the head of a slender sunfish

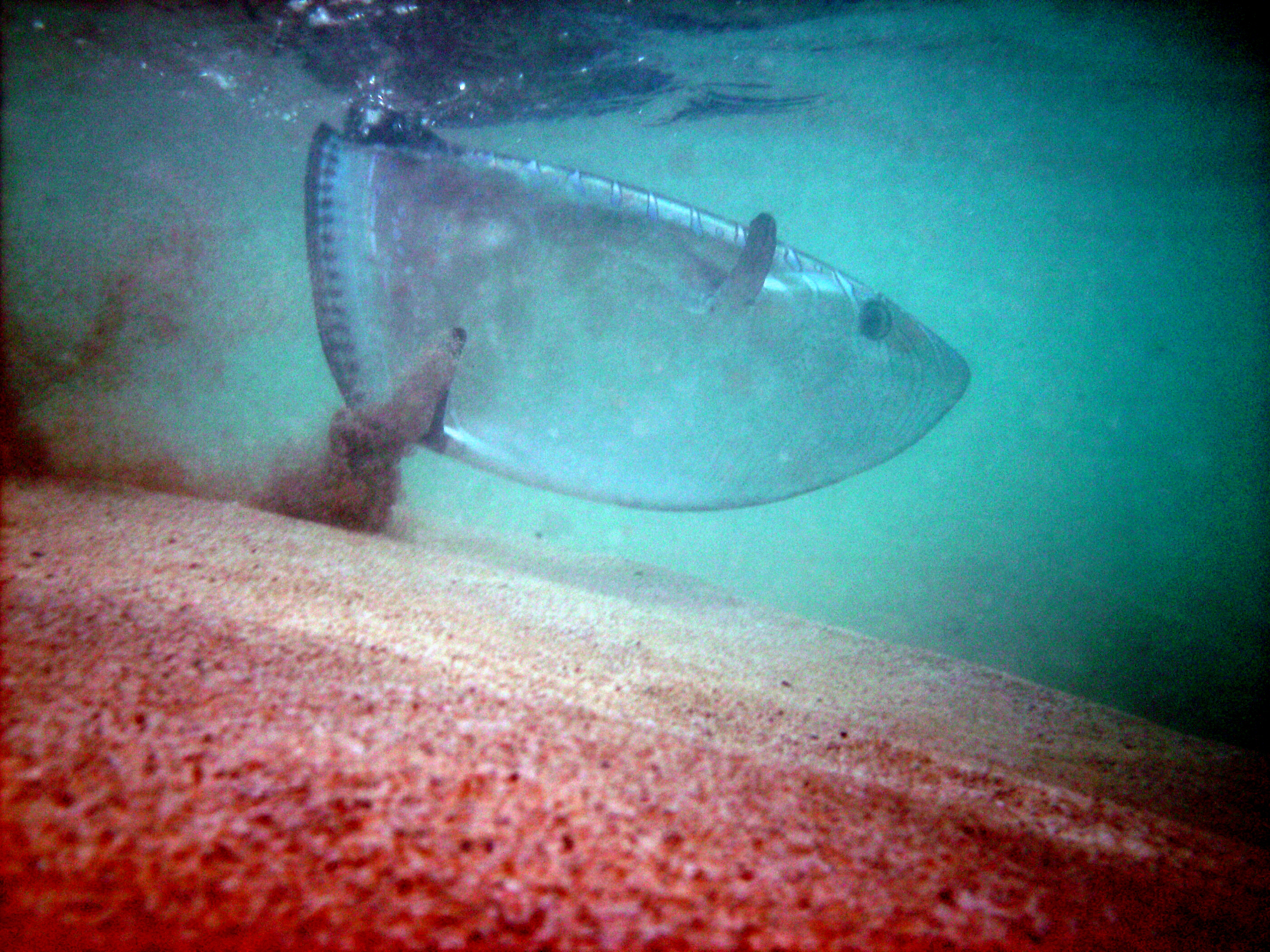
Slender sunfish in Napili Bay, Maui, Hawaii
