= Parkers Creek (Maryland) =

Coordinates: 38°31′32″N 76°31′59″W

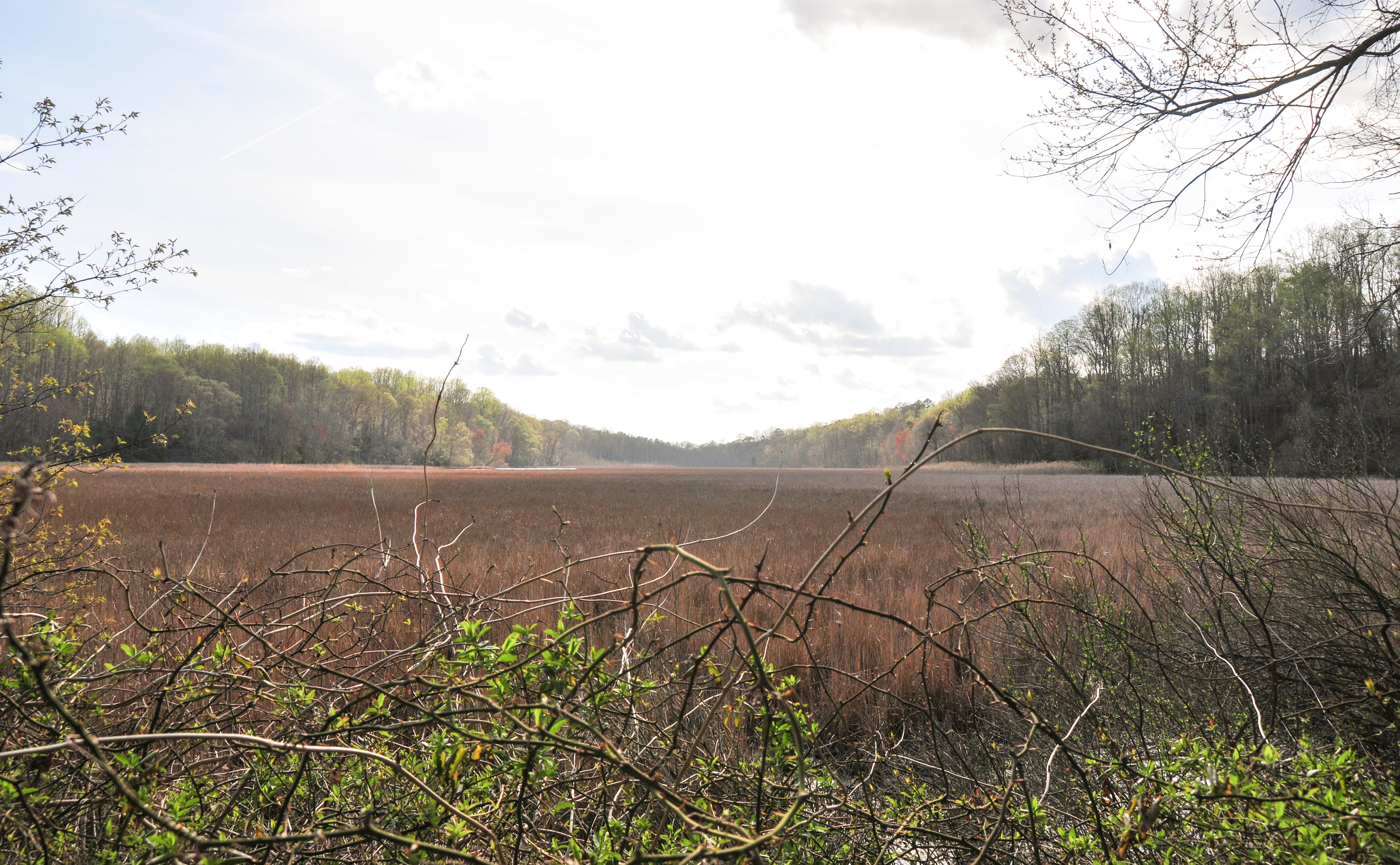
Parkers Creek is hidden by the tall grass and empties into the Chesapeake Bay.

Parkers Creek is a small tributary of the Chesapeake Bay located in central Calvert County, Maryland, United States. The creek entrance is just north of the bayside community of Scientists Cliffs. Most of the land surrounding the creek has been protected from development by numerous land trust purchases and conservation easements. Much of the creek is navigable by canoe. The creek's headwaters are south of the town of Prince Frederick.
