= Rhamphorrhina =

Scientific classification
- Domain: Eukaryota
- Kingdom: Animalia
- Phylum: Arthropoda
- Class: Insecta
- Order: Coleoptera
- Suborder: Polyphaga
- Infraorder: Scarabaeiformia
- Family: Scarabaeidae
- Subfamily: Cetoniinae
- Tribe: Goliathini
- Subtribe: Rhomborhinina
- Genus: Rhamphorrhina; Klug, 1855

Synonyms
- Mephistia Thomson, 1879; Neoranzania Distant, 1911; Ranzania Bertoloni, 1855

Genus of insects

Rhamphorrhina is a genus of beetles belonging to the subfamily Cetoniinae.

The species of this genus are found in Southern Africa.

Species:

- Rhamphorrhina bertolonii (Lucas, 1879)
- Rhamphorrhina splendens (Bertoloni, 1855)
