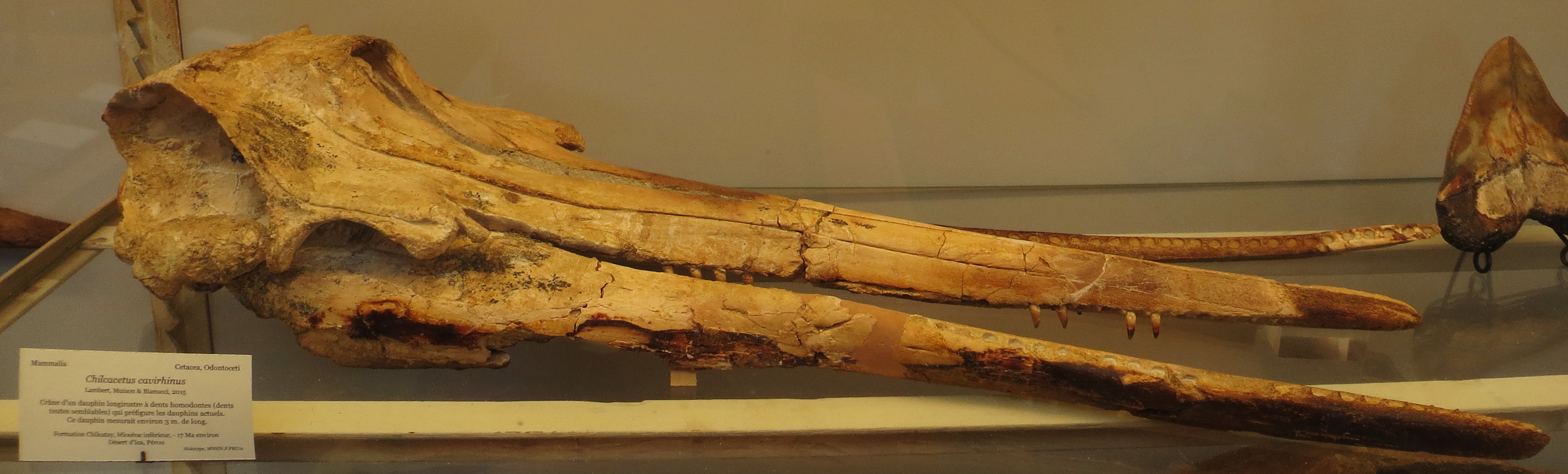
- Skull at the Gallery of Paleontology and Comparative Anatomy, Paris.

Scientific classification
- Kingdom: Animalia
- Phylum: Chordata
- Class: Mammalia
- Order: Artiodactyla
- Infraorder: Cetacea
- Genus: †Chilcacetus; Lambert et al. 2015
- Species: †C. cavirhinus

Binomial name
- †Chilcacetus cavirhinus Lambert et al. 2015

= Chilcacetus =

Chilcacetus Temporal range: Early Miocene (Deseadan) ~23 Ma

Extinct genus of mammals

Chilcacetus is an extinct genus of primitive odontocete known from Early Miocene (Aquitanian) of Peru. Fossils were found in and named after the Chilcatay Formation of the Pisco Basin.

== Classification ==
Chilcacetus is recovered along it with the putative eurhinodelphinids Argyrocetus and Macrodelphinus in a clade basal to Eoplatanista and Eurhinodelphinidae. The authors stressed that updated osteological descriptions of Argyrocetus and Macrodelphinus are necessary to provide more cladistic analysis support for this grouping.

== Description ==
The teeth of Chilcacetus are homodont in nature, and the rostrum is long. The presence of a cavity between nasals and mesethmoid on the posterior wall of the bony nares that distinguishes this taxon from other archaic odontocetes, hence the species name cavirhinus. The dorsal surface of the nasal rising anterodorsally, extended edentulous anterior premaxillary portion of the rostrum, and a cranium distinctly shorter than wide unite Chilcacetus with Argyrocetus and Macrodelphinus to the exclusion of all other homodont odontocetes, including eurhinodelphinids.
