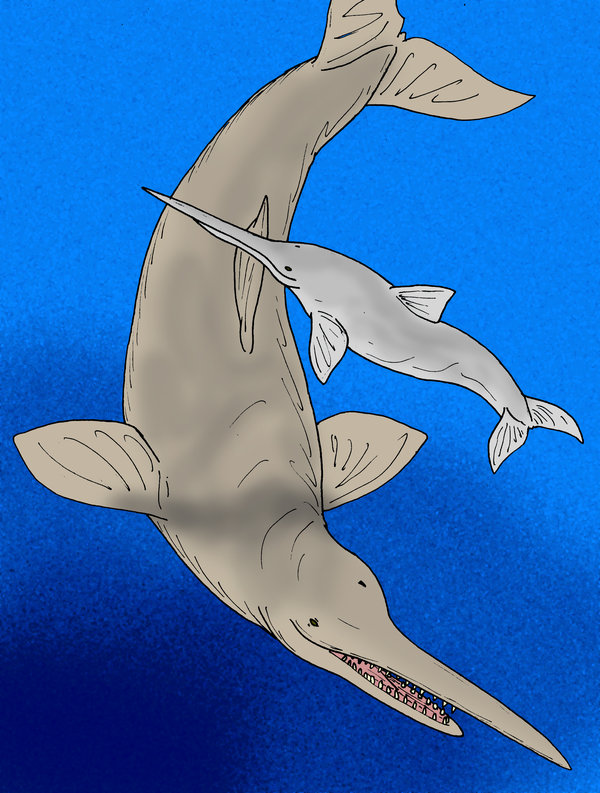
- Macrodelphinus and Eurhinodelphis.

Scientific classification
- Kingdom: Animalia
- Phylum: Chordata
- Class: Mammalia
- Order: Artiodactyla
- Infraorder: Cetacea
- Parvorder: Odontoceti
- Superfamily: †Eurhinodelphinoidea
- Family: †Eurhinodelphinidae; Abel, 1901

Genera
- see text

= Eurhinodelphinidae =

Eurhinodelphinidae Temporal range: 23.3–7.246 Ma Oligocene to Miocene

Extinct family of mammals

Eurhinodelphinidae is an extinct family of toothed whales which lived from the Oligocene to the Miocene. Members of the family possessed an elongated jaw similar in appearance to a swordfish.

== Taxonomy ==
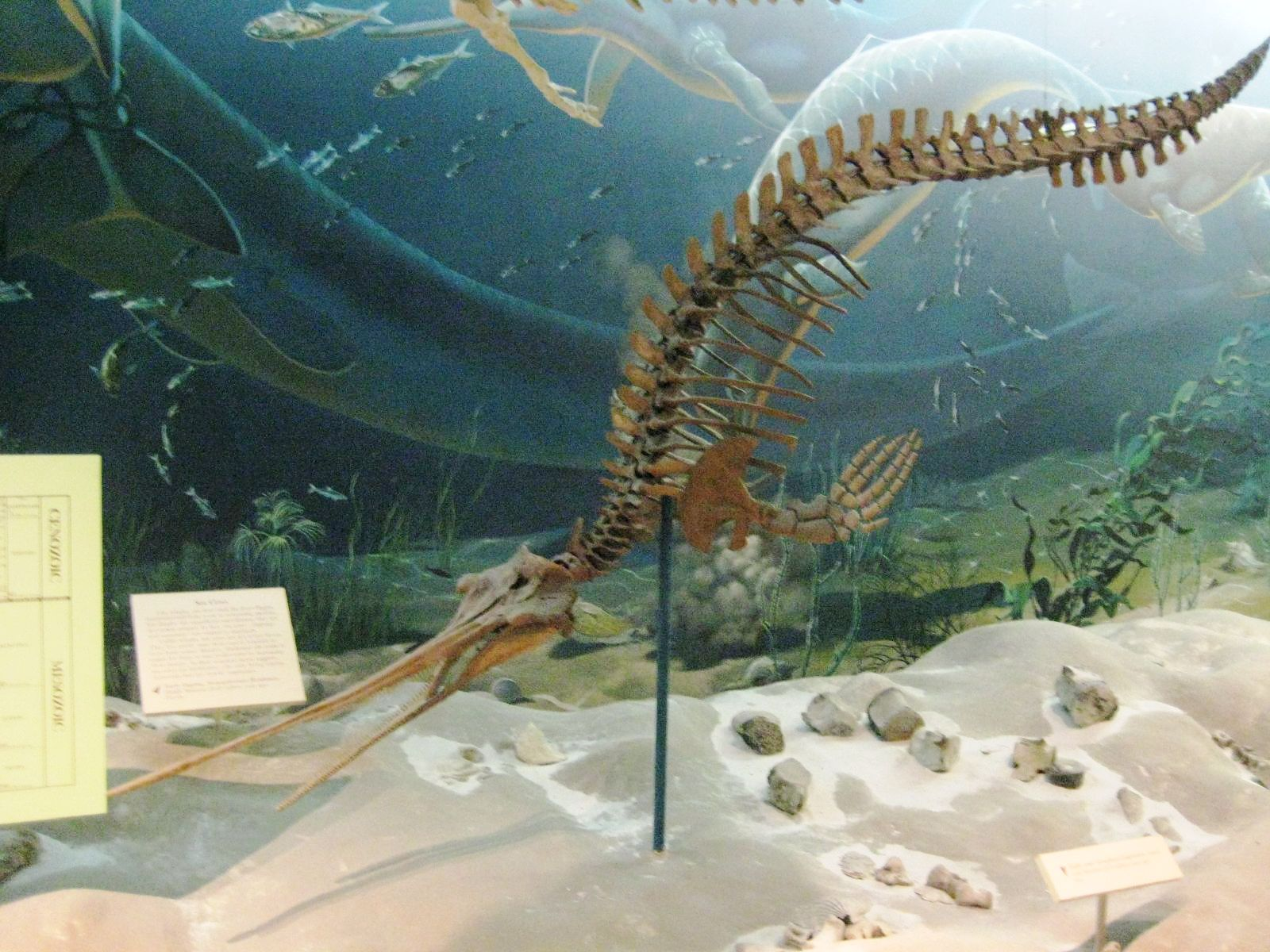
Skeleton of Xiphiacetus bossi

- Family Eurhinodelphinidae
  - Ceterhinops
  - Eurhinodelphis
  - Iniopsis
  - Mycteriacetus
  - Phocaenopsis
  - Schizodelphis
  - Vanbreenia
  - Xiphiacetus
  - Ziphiodelphis
