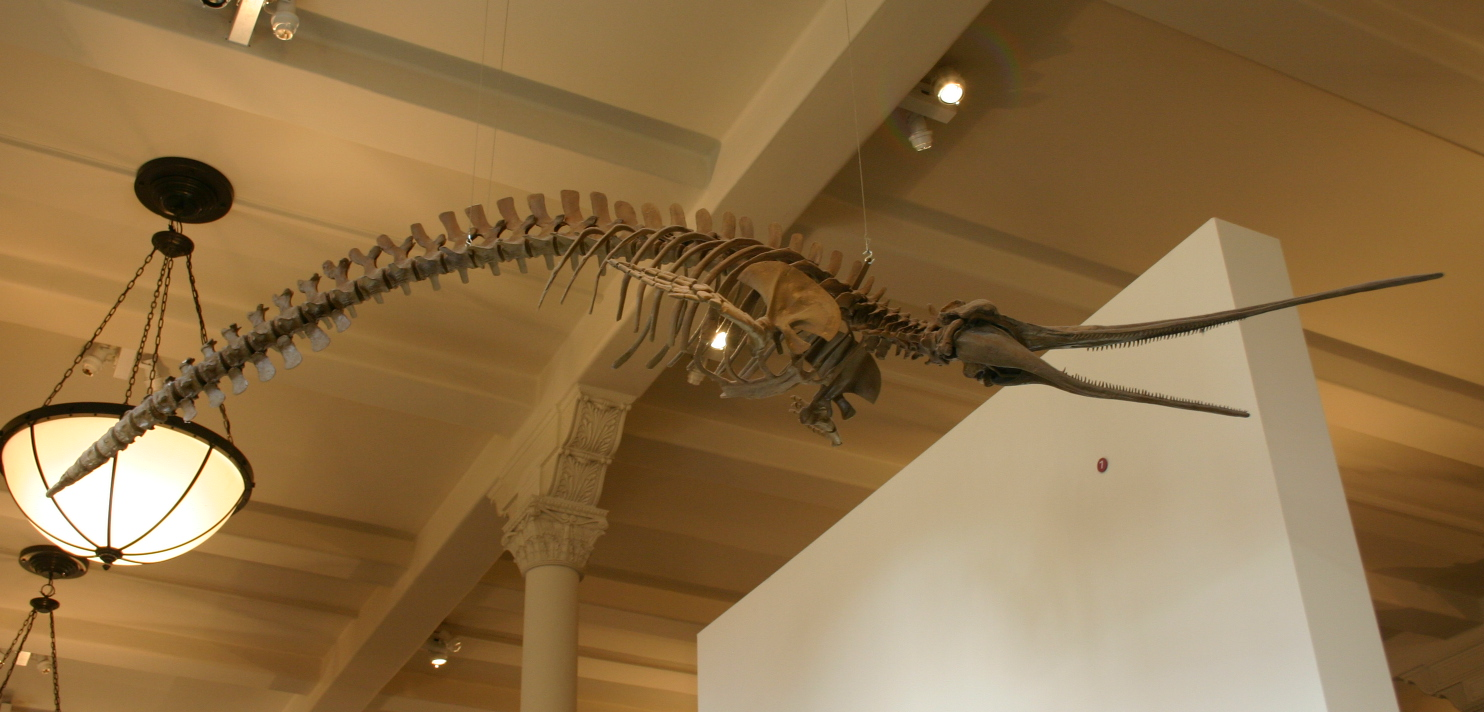
- Skeleton of E. longirostris

Scientific classification
- Kingdom: Animalia
- Phylum: Chordata
- Class: Mammalia
- Infraclass: Placentalia
- Order: Artiodactyla
- Infraorder: Cetacea
- Family: †Eurhinodelphinidae
- Genus: †Eurhinodelphis; Du Bus, 1867

Species
- E. cocheuteuxi Du Bus, 1867(type); E. longirostris Du Bus, 1872

= Eurhinodelphis =

Eurhinodelphis Temporal range: Middle Miocene–Late Miocene

Extinct genus of mammals

Eurhinodelphis ("well-nosed dolphin") is an extinct genus of Miocene cetacean. Its fossils have been found in Belgium, France, and Maryland.

== Species ==
Currently-valid species are:

- E. cocheuteuxi
- E. longirostris

Former species include:

- E. bossi, now a species of Xiphiacetus.

== Description ==
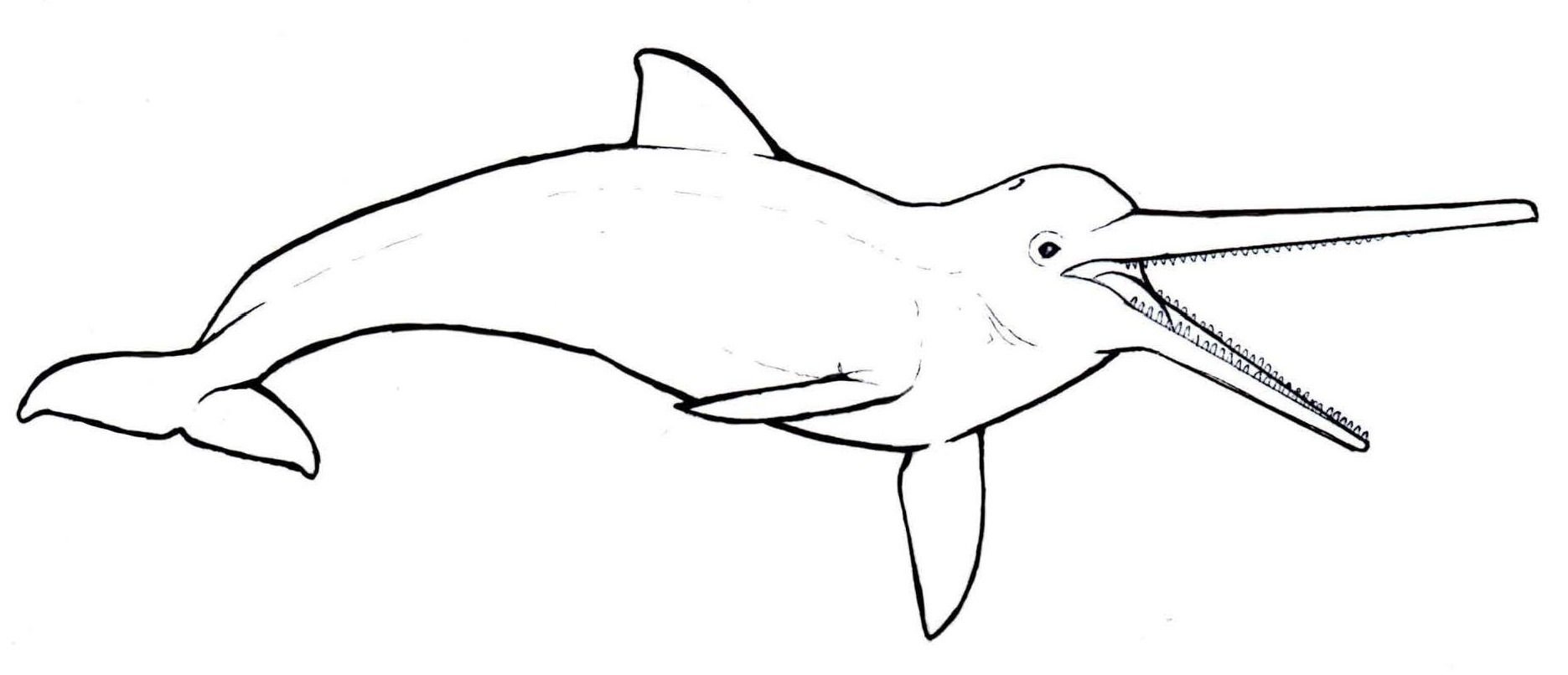
Life restoration

Eurhinodelphis was around 2 metres (6.6 ft) in length. In most respects, it would have looked like a modern dolphin or porpoise, but its upper jaw was elongated into a sharp tip similar to that of a swordfish. Most likely, Eurhinodelphis used it in a similar manner to swordfish, hitting or stabbing prey. It also had long, sharp teeth.

Compared with earlier fossil species, Eurhinodelphis had complex ears, suggesting that it already hunted by echolocation like modern whales. Its brain was also asymmetrical, a trait found in modern dolphins, and possibly associated with the complexities of navigating its environment.

== History ==
Eurhinodelphis was first described by Bernard du Bus de Gisignies in a paper read before the Royal Academy of Sciences of Belgium on 17 December 1867. Othenio Abel studied and illustrated the European species in a series of articles published in 1901, 1902 and 1905; subsequently, fossil skulls found in the Calvert Formation in Maryland and Virginia could be attributed to this genus.
