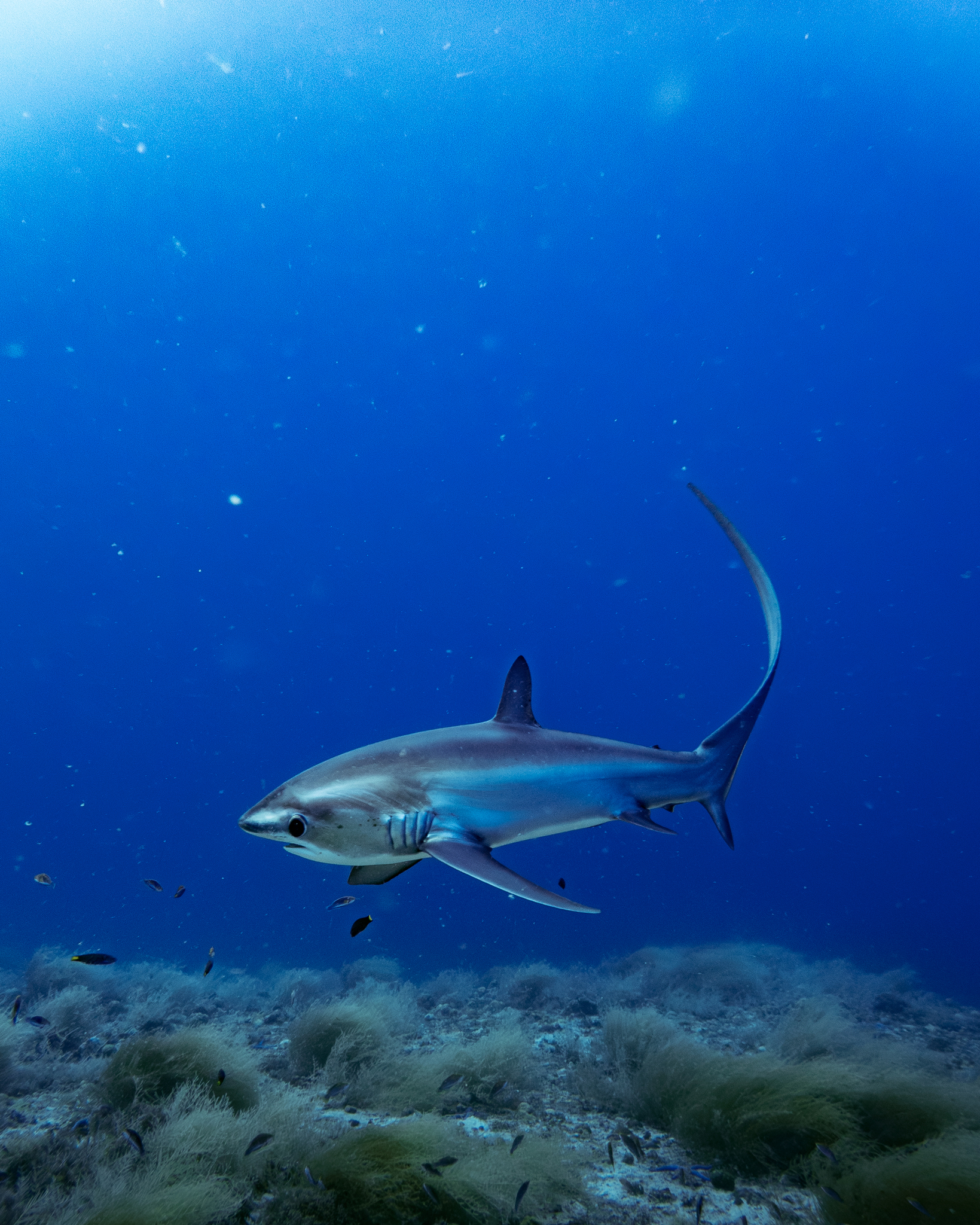
- Pelagic thresher (A. pelagicus)

Scientific classification
- Kingdom: Animalia
- Phylum: Chordata
- Class: Chondrichthyes
- Subclass: Elasmobranchii
- Division: Selachii
- Order: Lamniformes
- Family: Alopiidae; Bonaparte, 1838

Genera
- Alopias; †Anotodus?; †Paranomotodon; †Usakias; †Trigonotodus?

= Alopiidae =

Alopiidae Temporal range: Late Cretaceous–recent (Maastrichtian–Holocene), 70–0 Ma

Family of sharks

Alopiidae is a family of large mackerel sharks (order Lamniformes). The only extant genus is the thresher shark (Alopias). The extinct genera Anotodus, Paranomotodon, Usakias and Trigonotodus have been proposed as members of this family.

It is believed that thresher sharks originated from a common ancestor that appeared in the Late Cretaceous, at least 70 million years ago. The first thresher sharks of the genus Alopias appeared about 50 million years ago. Trigonotodus is known from the Oligocene.
