= Pucking =

- Municipality
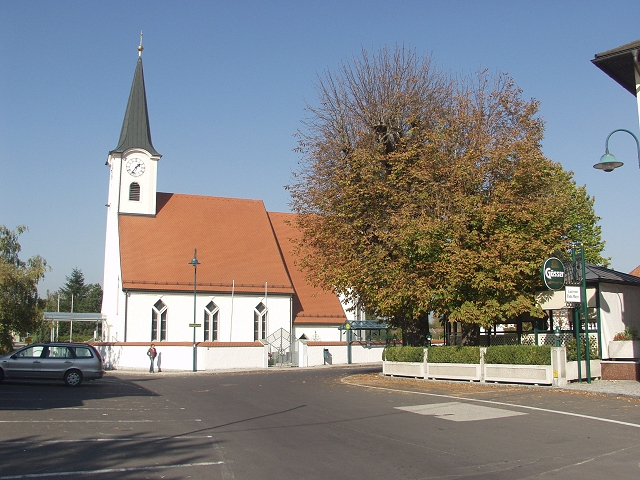
- Saint Michael's church

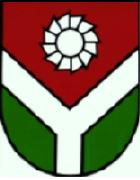
- Coat of arms

- Location within Austria
- Coordinates: 48°11′21″N 14°11′1″E
- Country: Austria
- State: Upper Austria
- District: Linz-Land

Government
  - Mayor: Robert Aflenzer (ÖVP)

Area
  - Total: 19.67 km^{2} (7.59 sq mi)
- Elevation: 286 m (938 ft)

Population (2018-01-01)
  - Total: 3,904
  - Density: 198.5/km^{2} (514.0/sq mi)
- Time zone: UTC+1 (CET)
  - Summer (DST): UTC+2 (CEST)
- Postal code: 4055
- Area code: 07229
- Vehicle registration: LL
- Website: www.pucking.at

Pucking is a small town in the Linz-Land district in the Austrian state of Upper Austria.

== Geography ==
Pucking lies in central Upper Austria. About 19 percent of the municipality is forest, and 62 percent is farmland.
