= List of longest fish =

This list includes extant fish with reported maximum length more than 6 metres.

Rank	Animal	Scientific name	Maximum length	Image	Habitat
1	Whale shark	Rhincodon typus	18.8 m (62 ft) (see Whale shark)		
2	Basking shark	Cetorhinus maximus	12.27 m (40.3 ft)		
3	Giant oarfish	Regalecus glesne	11 m (36 ft)		
4	Russell's oarfish	Regalecus russellii	8 m (26 ft)		
5	Largetooth sawfish	Pristis pristis	7.5 m (25 ft)		
6	Tiger shark	Galeocerdo cuvier	7.4 m (24 ft)		
7	Longcomb sawfish	Pristis zijsron	7.3 m (24 ft)		
8	Greenland shark	Somniosus microcephalus	7.3 m (24 ft)		
9	Beluga sturgeon	Huso huso	7.2 m (24 ft)		
10	Great white shark	Carcharodon carcharias	7.1 m (23 ft) (disputed)		
11	Pacific sleeper shark	Somniosus pacificus	7 m (23 ft)		
12	Common thresher shark	Alopias vulpinus	6.5 m (21 ft)		
13	Goblin shark	Mitsukurina owstoni	6.2 m (20 ft)		
14	Great hammerhead shark	Sphyrna mokarran	6.1 m (20 ft)		
15	White sturgeon	Sinosturio transmontanus	6.1 m (20 ft)		
16	Bluntnose sixgill shark	Hexanchus griseus	6.1 m (20 ft)		
17	European sea sturgeon	Acipenser sturio	6 m (20 ft)		

== See also ==
- List of largest fish
- Largest organisms
