= List of largest fish =

Largest known fish species

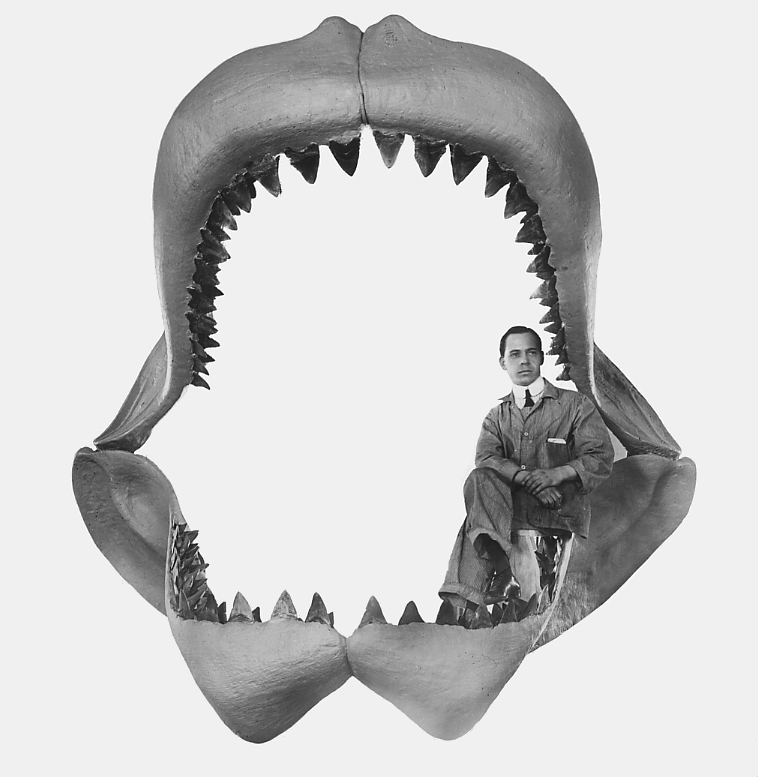
The jaws of a megalodon, likely the largest fish to have ever existed

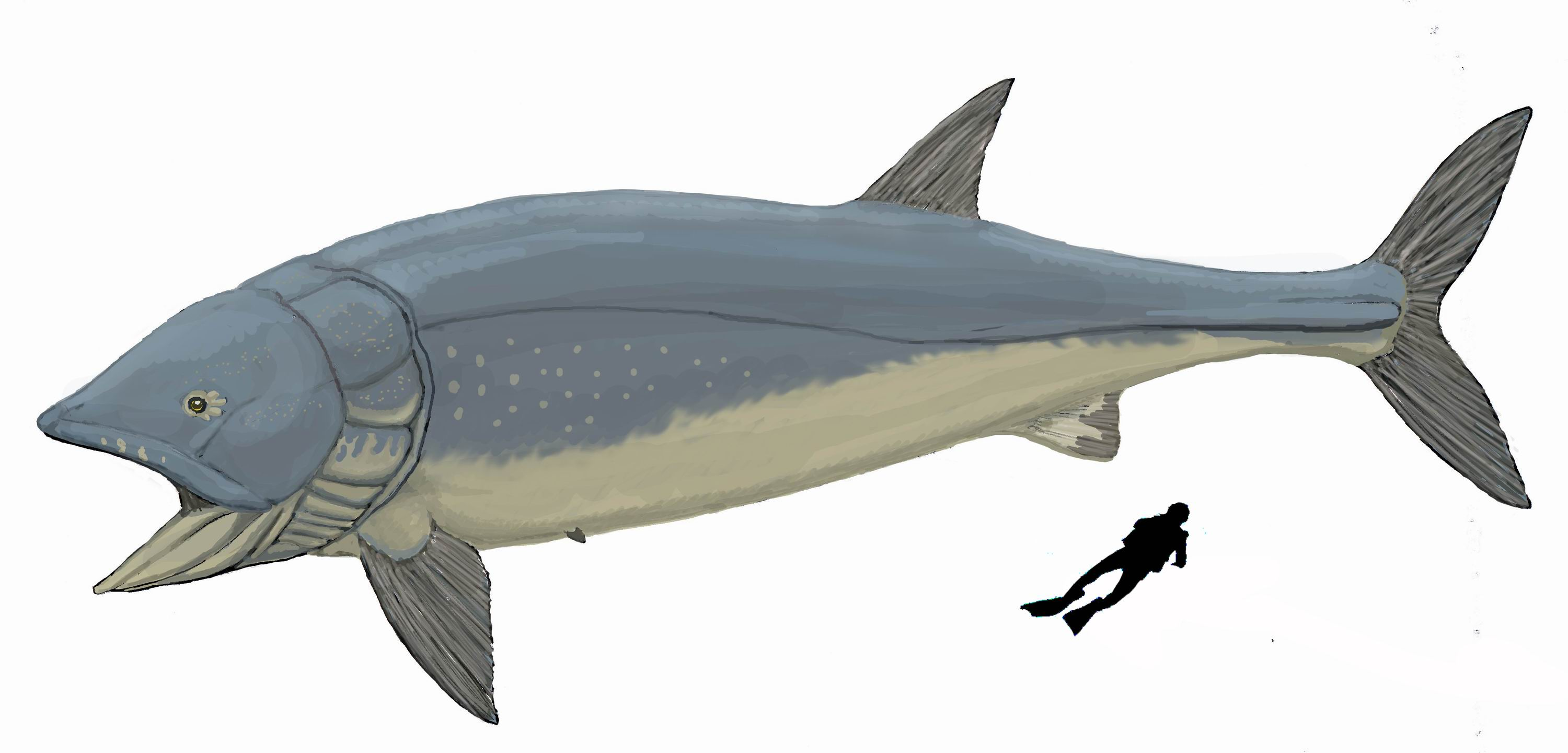
Life restoration of the extinct Leedsichthys, one of the largest bony fish to have ever lived

Fish vary greatly in size. The extant whale shark and basking shark exceed all other fish by a considerable margin in weight and length. The extinct Otodus megalodon exceeds all other fish, extant and extinct (excluding tetrapods), in size. Fish in the common usage are a paraphyletic group that describes aquatic vertebrates while excluding the tetrapods, four limbed vertebrates nested within the lobe-finned fish, which include all land vertebrates and their nearest extinct relatives.

This list therefore excludes the various marine reptiles and mammals, such as the extinct ichthyosaur, plesiosaur and mosasaur reptiles (none of which are dinosaurs) and the extant sirenia and cetacea mammals (such as the marine tetrapod blue whale, generally considered to be the largest animal known to have ever lived). (Note: The extinct whale species Perucetus colossus (described in 2023) has been suggested as similar to the blue whale in size, although this has been disputed. Several extinct dinosaurs may also have reached a similar mass to the blue whale.)

== Largest extant fish ==
Rank	Name	Binomial name	Taxonomic class	Known maximum mass (tonnes, lb)	Maximum length [m (ft)]	Images	Size comparison to human
1	Whale shark	Rhincodon typus	Chondrichthyes (Cartilaginous fish)	21.5 tonnes (47,000 lb)	18.8 metres (61.7 ft)		
2	Basking shark	Cetorhinus maximus	Chondrichthyes (Cartilaginous fish)	16 tonnes (35,000 lb)	14 metres (46 ft)		
3	Great white shark	Carcharodon carcharias	Chondrichthyes (Cartilaginous fish)	3.324 tonnes (7,330 lb)	7 metres (23 ft)		
4	Tiger shark	Galeocerdo cuvier	Chondrichthyes (Cartilaginous fish)	3.11 tonnes (6,900 lb) (unconfirmed)	7.5 metres (25 ft) (unconfirmed)		
5	Giant oceanic manta ray	Mobula birostris	Chondrichthyes (Cartilaginous fish)	3 tonnes (6,600 lb)	5 metres (16 ft)		
6	Giant sunfish	Mola alexandrini	Osteichthyes (Bony fish)	2.744 tonnes (6,050 lb)	3.3 metres (11 ft)		
7	Ocean sunfish	Mola mola	Osteichthyes (Bony fish)	2.3 tonnes (5,100 lb)	3.1 metres (10 ft)		
8	Beluga sturgeon	Huso huso	Osteichthyes (Bony fish)	2.072 tonnes (4,570 lb)	7.2 metres (24 ft)		
9	Sharptail mola	Masturus lanceolatus	Osteichthyes (Bony fish)	2 tonnes (4,400 lb)	3.0 metres (9.8 ft)		
10	Hoodwinker sunfish	Mola tecta	Osteichthyes (Bony fish)	1.87 tonnes (4,100 lb)	2.4 metres (7.9 ft)		
11	Reef manta ray	Manta alfredi	Chondrichthyes (Cartilaginous fish)	1.4 tonnes (3,100 lb)	5.5 metres (18 ft)		
12	Greenland shark	Somniosus microcephalus	Chondrichthyes (Cartilaginous fish)	1.397 tonnes (3,080 lb)	7.3 metres (24 ft)		
13	Megamouth shark	Megachasma pelagios	Chondrichthyes (Cartilaginous fish)	1.215 tonnes (2,680 lb)	5.2 metres (17 ft)		
14	Kaluga	Sinosturio dauricus	Osteichthyes (Bony fish)	1.14 tonnes (2,500 lb)	5.6 metres (18 ft)		

== Jawless fish (Agnatha) ==
- Hagfish (Myxini)

Hagfish are among the most primitive extant vertebrates. There is only one order and family in this animal class. All of the 77 known species have elongated, eel-like bodies but can be distinguished by their downward-facing mouths. The largest form is the goliath hagfish (Eptatretus goliath). This species can range up to 1.28 m (4.2 ft) in length and weigh to 6.2 kg (14 lb).

- Lampreys (Petromyzontiformes)

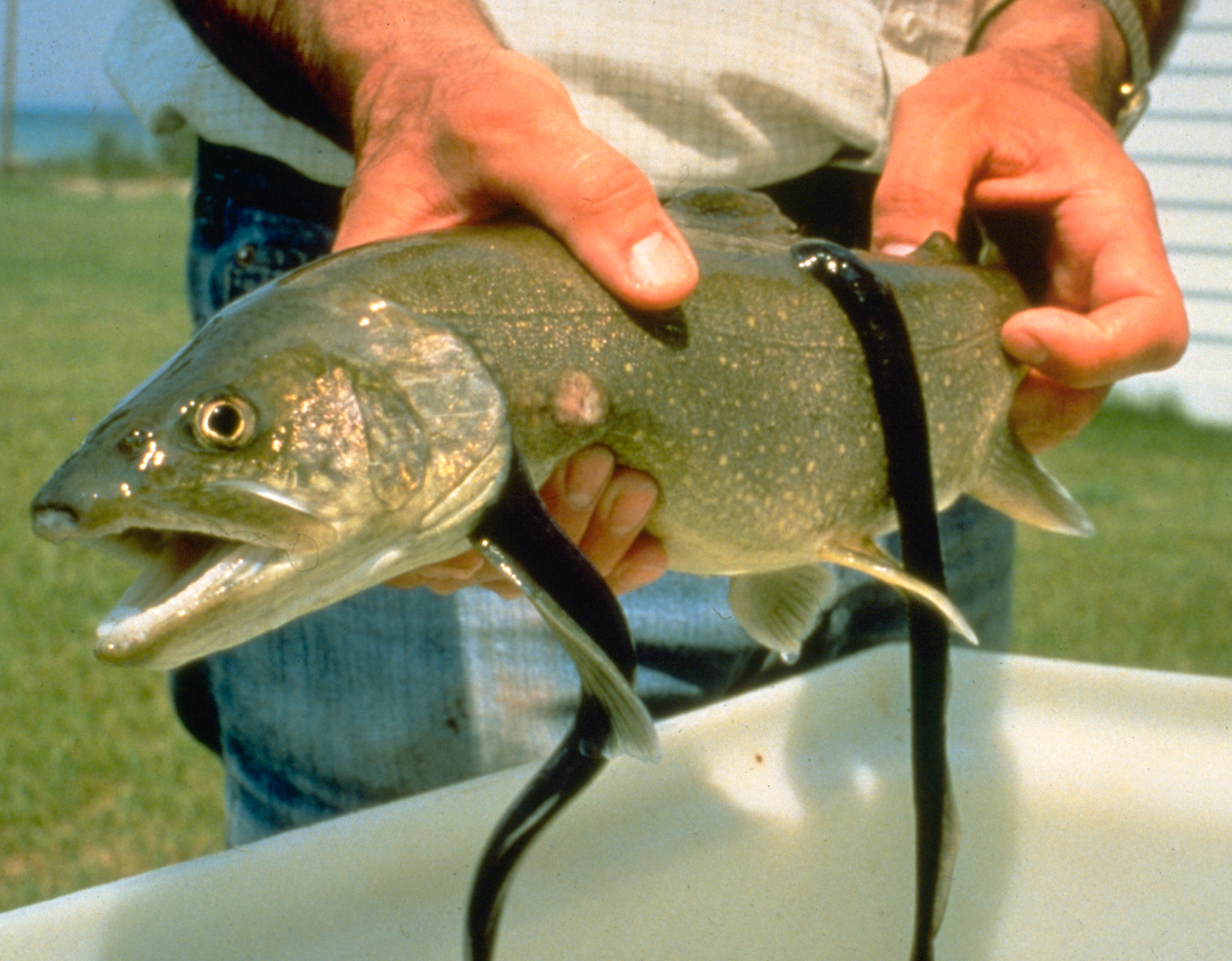
Sea lamprey feeding on a lake trout

Lampreys, as with the hagfish, appear eel-like in shape. They have cartilaginous skeletons and have been evolving separately from any other group for over 400 million years. They are predatory and often attach themselves to a fish or other small animal and gradually drain blood and organs. The largest species is the sea lamprey (Petromyzon marinus), which can grow to 1.2 m (3.9 ft) and weigh 2.5 kg (5.5 lb).

== Armored fish (Placodermi) ==
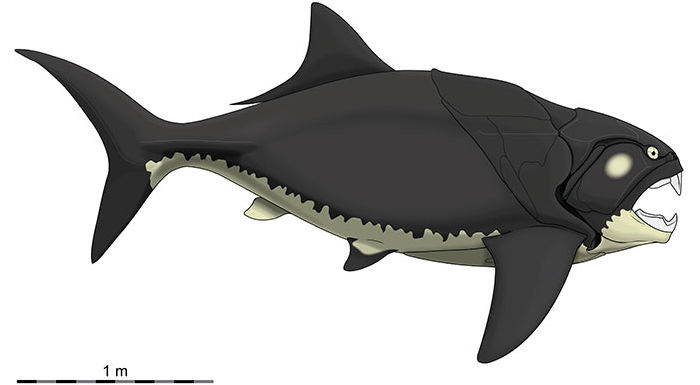
2024 reconstruction of Dunkleosteus terrelli

The largest fish of the now-extinct class Placodermi was the giant predatory Dunkleosteus. The largest and most well-known species was D. terrelli, which grew almost 4.1 m (13.5 ft) in length Engelman (2023), using an ellipsoid volumetric method, estimated weights of 950–1,200 kilograms (2,090–2,650 lb) for typical (3.41 metres (11.2 ft) long) adult Dunkleosteus, and weights of 1,494–1,764 kilograms (3,294–3,889 lb) for the largest (4.1 metres (13.5 ft)) individual. Its filter feeding relative, Titanichthys, may have rivaled it in size. Titanichthys reached a length of 7 m (23 ft) though in older paper it was estimated at 7.5 m (25 ft). However, according to a 2023 paper, it would have been the same size as Dunkleosteus.

== Cartilaginous fish (Chondrichthyes) ==
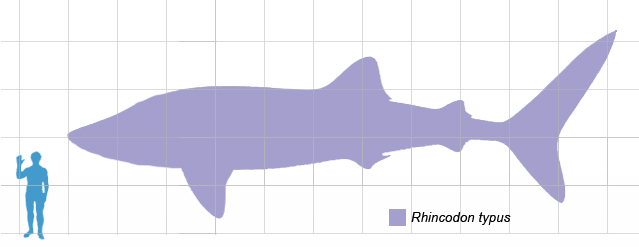
A size comparison of a whale shark and a human

The cartilaginous fish are not directly related to the "bony fish," but are sometimes lumped together for simplicity in description. The largest living cartilaginous fish, of the order Orectolobiformes, is the whale shark (Rhincodon typus), of the world's tropical oceans. It is also the largest living animal that is not a cetacean and, like the largest whales, it is a docile creature that filter-feeds on tiny plankton. With average lengths estimates between 9–14.5 metres (30–48 ft), with regional variation in average body size being possible. The largest verified and reliably measured individual was a female individual repoted from the Arabian Sea with a standard length of 15 metres (49 ft) with an estimated Total length of 18.8 metres (62 ft). The largest maximum possibly attainable size a whale shark could potentially attain is 21.9 metres (72 ft).

The extinct Megalodon is estimated to have been the largest cartilaginous fish as well as the largest fish to have ever existed. It was macropredatory feeding mainly on marine mammals. With maximum total length estimates ranging from 14.3–24.3 metres (47–80 ft). With the 24.3 meter specimen being estimated to have been around 94 tonnes (94,000 kg) in weight.

- Ground sharks (Carcharhiniformes)

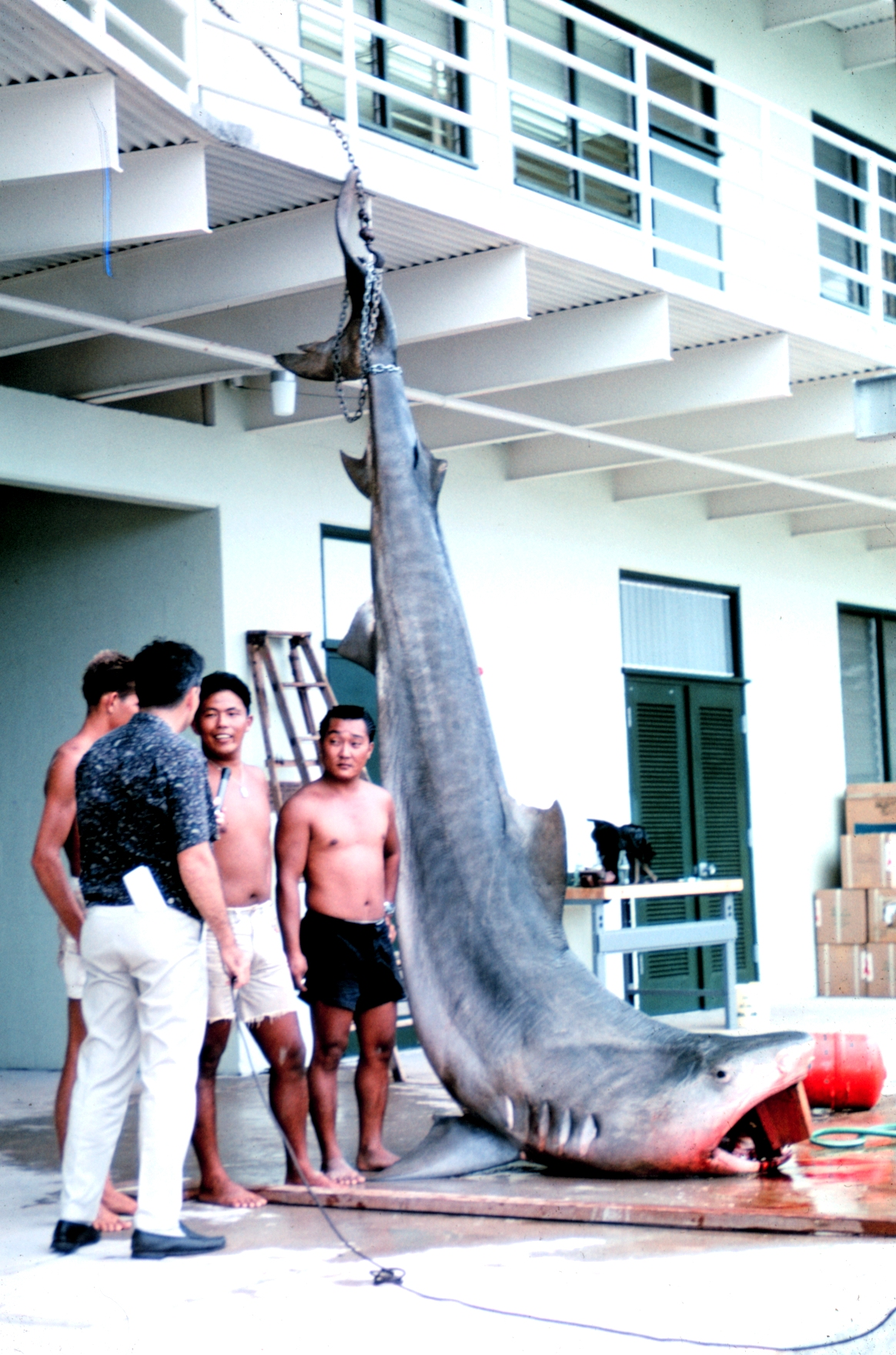
A large tiger shark ranks as the biggest of ground sharks

The largest species of this order is the widely distributed tiger shark (Galeocerdo cuvier). Specimens have been verified to at least 5.5 m (18 ft) but even larger ones have been reported. One specimen, a gravid female caught off Australia and measuring only 5.5 m (18 ft) long, weighed an exceptional 1,524 kg (3,360 lb). A female caught in 1957 reportedly measured 7.4 m (24 ft) and weighing 3,110 kg (6,860 lb), although this very outsized shark is not known to have been confirmed. The largest of the "requiem sharks" in the family Carcharhinidae is disputed. In axial length, it seems to be the dusky shark (C. obscurus), at up to 4.2 m (14 ft) and a weight of 350 kg (770 lb). However, the bulkier bull shark (C. leucas) has been estimated to weigh about 575 kg (1,268 lb) in recent specimens that measured over 4 m (13 ft) long. The silky shark (C. falciformis) is another contender for the largest requiem shark at a maximum weight of 350 kg (770 lb) and a maximum length of around 3.5 m (11 ft). The largest hammerhead shark is the great hammerhead (Sphyrna mokarran), which can reach 6.1 m (20 ft) and weigh at least 500 kg (1,100 lb). The most species-rich shark family, the catsharks, are fairly small-bodied. The largest, the nursehound (Scyliorhinus stellaris), can grow up to 1.7 m (5.6 ft) and a weight of at least 10.8 kg (24 lb).
Within the Triakidae family, also known as houndsharks, the largest is the heavily overfished school shark (Galeorhinus galeus), also known as the soupfin shark, which can reach up to 1.95 m (6.4 ft) and 45.4 kg (100 lb). Other large fish in the order are the leopard shark (Triakis semifasciata), with one specimen recorded at 2.13 m (7.0 ft) in length, and the common smoothhound (Mustelus mustelus) at 2 m (6.6 ft).

- Chimaeras (Chimaeriformes)

These odd, often translucent cartilaginous fish are typically quite small. The largest species is the carpenter's chimaera (Chimaera lignaria) of the oceans near Australia and New Zealand. It can reach up to 1.5 m (4.9 ft) in length and weigh 15.4 kg (34 lb).

- Frill sharks and cow sharks (Hexanchiformes)

The largest of the frill sharks and cow shark is the bluntnose sixgill shark (Hexanchus griseus). This large species typically inhabits depths greater than 90 m (300 ft), and has been recorded as deep as 1,875 m (6,152 ft). The largest specimen known (caught off Cuba) reportedly weighed 763 kg (1,682 lb) and measured 4.82 m (15.8 ft) long.

- Bullhead sharks (Heterodontiformes)

These tropical, small sharks are noted for their broad head shape. The largest species is the Port Jackson shark (Heterodontus portusjacksoni) of Australasian waters, at up to 1.65 m (5.4 ft) long and weighing up to 20 kg (44 lb).

- Mackerel sharks (Lamniformes)

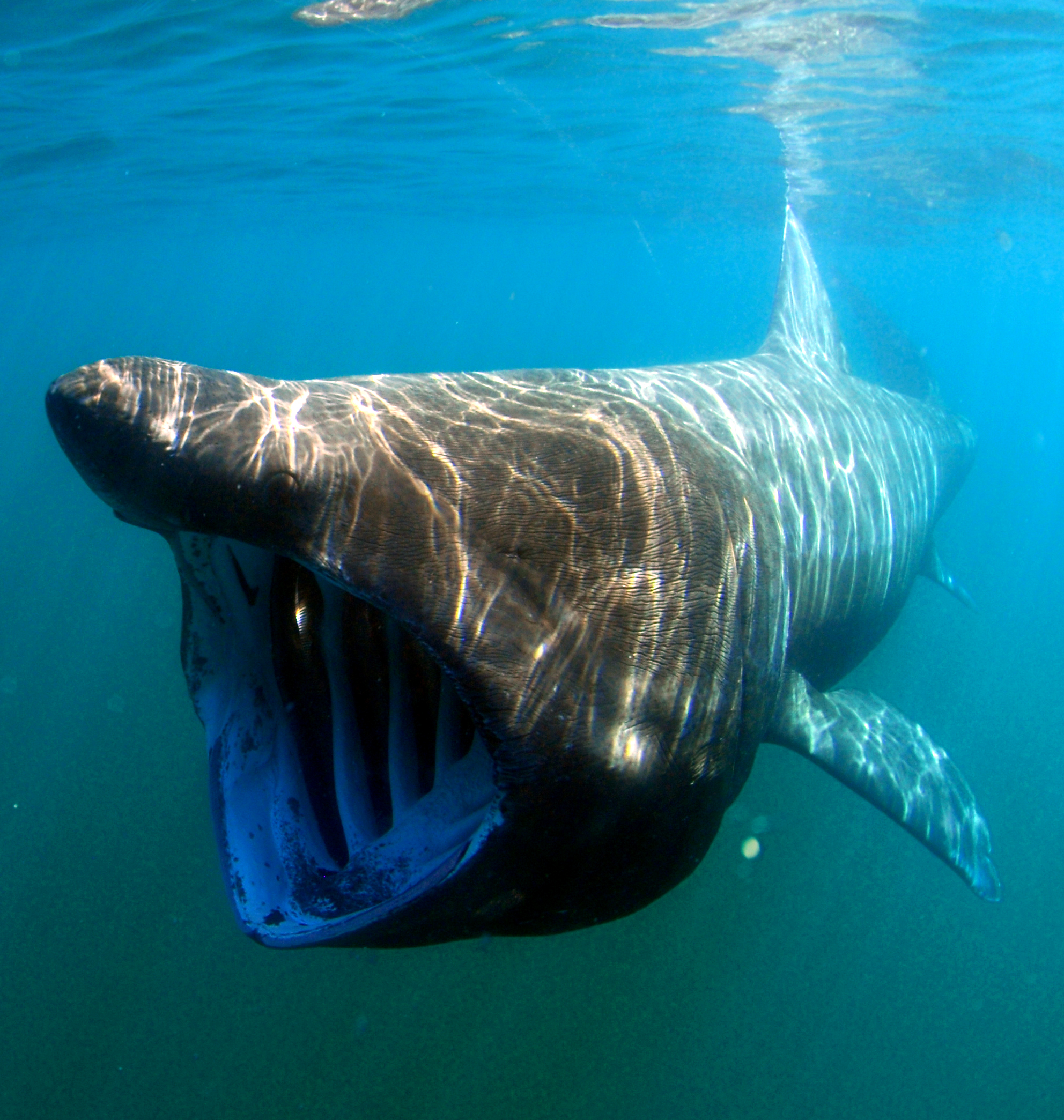
The dramatically large mouth of the basking shark, the second largest living fish

Most species in this order grow quite large. The largest living species is the basking shark (Cetorhinus maximus) of the world's northern temperate oceans, also the second largest fish. The largest specimen, which was examined in 1851, measured 12.3 m (40 ft) long and weighed 16 tonnes (16,000 kg; 35,000 lb). Perhaps the most famous "big fish" is the great white shark (Carcharodon carcharias). Specimens have been measured up to 6.4 m (21 ft) and weighing 3,312 kg (7,302 lb), with great whites of at least 7 m (23 ft) long generally accepted. The common thresher (Alopias vulpinus), can grow to 7.6 m (25 ft) and weigh over 510 kg (1,120 lb), but much of its length is comprised by its extreme tail. Odd and recently discovered giants also live in this order: the slender, sword-snouted goblin shark (Mitsukurina owstoni), with unweighted specimens of up to approximately 6.17 m (20.2 ft), and the massive megamouth shark (Megachasma pelagios), up to 5.6 m (18 ft) long and a weight of 1,215 kg (2,679 lb).

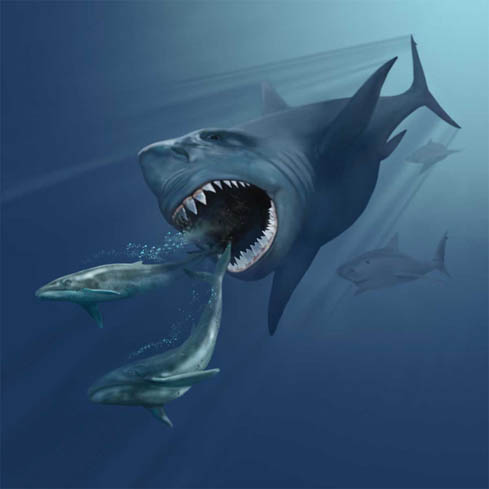
An artist's impression of Otodus megalodon, thought to be the largest shark ever, pursuing two Eobalaenoptera whales

The largest shark in the fossil record is the megalodon (Otodus megalodon), a colossal Neogene lamniform. The range of estimates of the maximum length for megalodon are from 17 to 24.3 m (56 to 80 ft), with a mass ranging from 65 to 114 short tons (59 to 103 t). It is also regarded as the largest macro-predatory fish ever. Another extinct giant was the Ginsu shark (Cretoxyrhina mantelli) a Cretaceous shark that is estimated to have approached 8 m in length and 4,944 kilograms in mass.

- Stingrays and allies (Myliobatiformes)

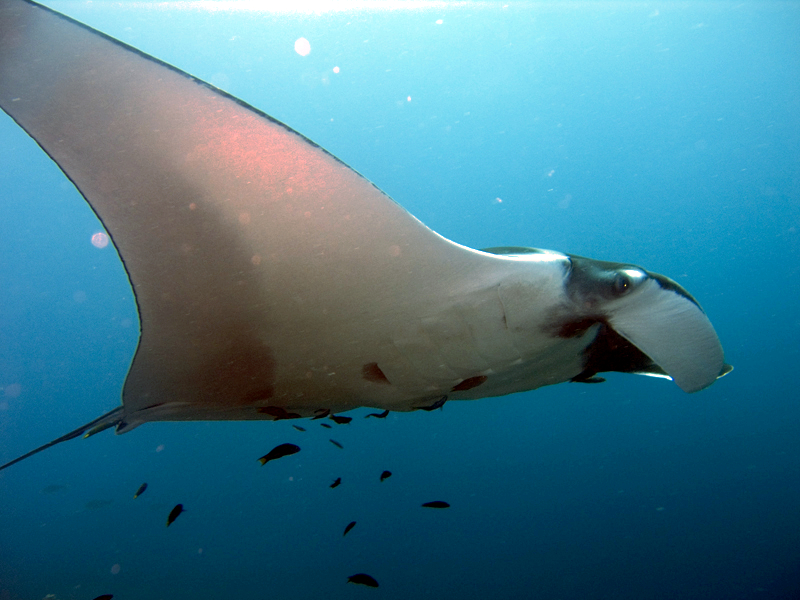
The manta ray, here seen at Hin Daeng, Thailand, is the largest ray.

Both the largest species of this order and the largest of all rays is the giant oceanic manta ray (Manta birostris). This peaceful leviathan can reach a weight of 3,000 kg (6,600 lb), a "disk" width of 9.1 m (30 ft) and a total length of 5 m (16 ft). A related species reaches barely smaller sizes, the devil fish (Mobula mobular). It can grow up to a 5.2 m (17 ft) disk width, a total length of 6.5 m (21 ft) and a weight of at least 1,000 kg (2,200 lb). The largest stingray is generally accepted to be the short-tail stingray (Dasyatis brevicaudata), found off the southern tip of Africa and Australasia, at up to 4.3 m (14 ft) across the disk and weighing more than 350 kg (770 lb). Although there are several large stingrays that at least approach this species' size. One, the giant freshwater stingray (Himantura polylepis), of the large rivers of South Asia, can weigh up to 600 kg (1,300 lb), measure up to 5 m (16 ft) in total length and have a disc span of 2.4 m (7.9 ft). The largest verifiably recorded was 300 kg (660 lb) and 4 m (13 ft). Still, they are the largest of all freshwater exclusive (non-anadromous) fish.

- Carpet sharks (Orectolobiformes)

The whale shark is the largest species in this order, reaching up to 20 meters long when fully mature. No other species in the order even approaches this size. The next largest species is the nurse shark (Ginglymostoma cirratum), which can grow up to 4.3 m (14 ft) across the disk and weighing more than 350 kg (770 lb).

- Sawfish (Pristiformes)

Distinguished by a long snout decorated with sharp teeth on the sides, these little-known cartilaginous fish are often reported to attain huge sizes. The definitive largest species is not known, although the smalltooth sawfish (Pristis pectinata) and the green sawfish (P. zijsron), at up to reportedly 7.6 and 7.3 m (25 and 24 ft), respectively, may be the largest. Weights of up to 1,955 kg (4,310 lb) have been reported, possibly for the smalltooth species, but are not verified. The large-tooth sawfish (P. pristis) and freshwater sawfish (P. microdon) can both exceed 6.5 m (21 ft).

- Sawsharks (Pristiophoriformes)

Despite sharing a similar appearing snout adapted in both to shred fish prey, the sawsharks are typically much smaller than sawfish. The largest sawshark is the Sixgill sawshark (Pliotrema warreni) of the South Indian ocean, which can grow up to 1.7 m (5.6 ft) and weigh 15 kg (33 lb).

- Skates and allies (Rajiformes)

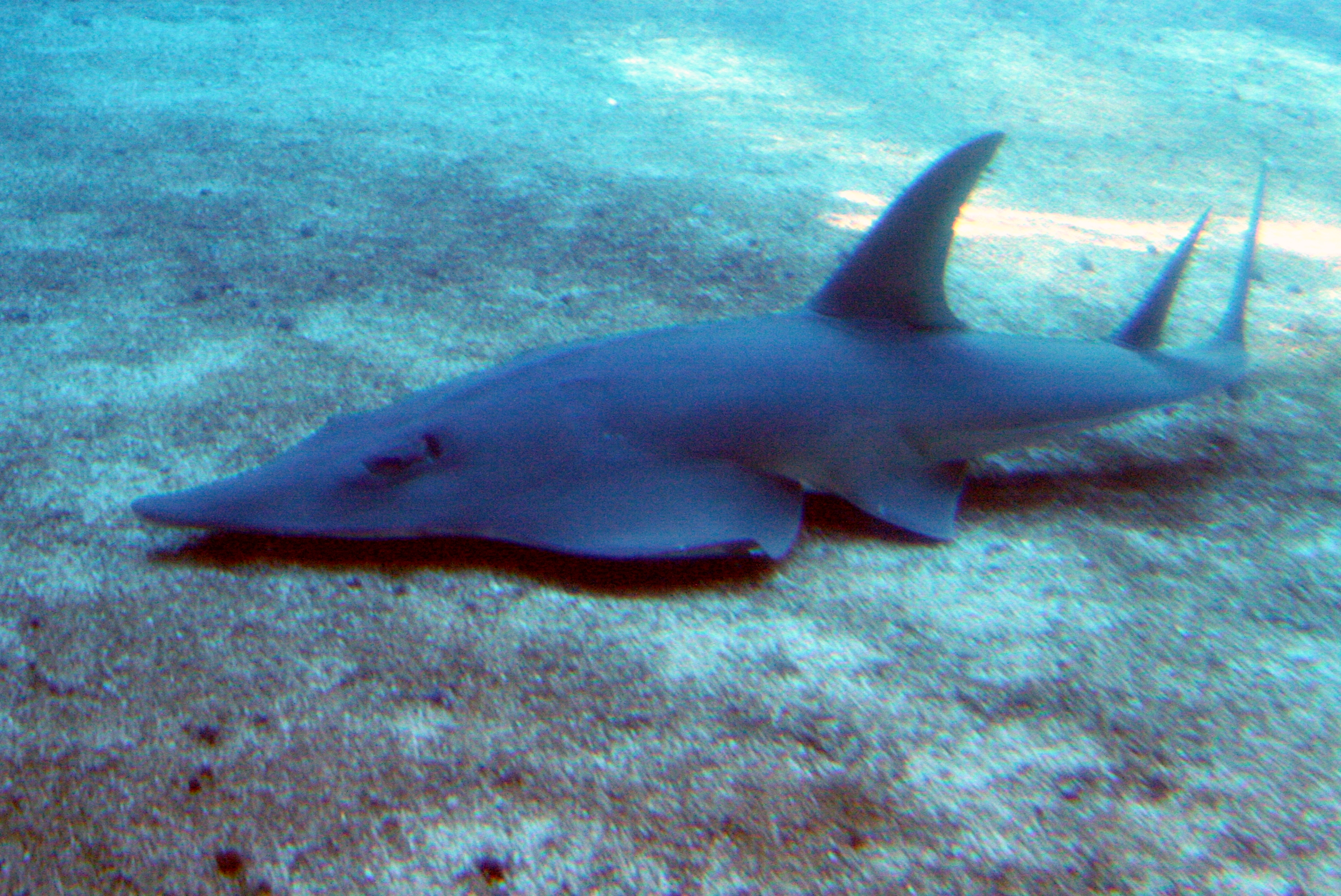
The giant guitarfish is largest species in the skate order

The largest and most diverse order of rays' largest species is the giant guitarfish (Rhynchobatus djiddensis) of the Red Sea and the Eastern Indian Ocean. The top size of the species is 227 kg (500 lb) and 3.1 m (10 ft). The largest of the skates is the flapper skate (Dipturus intermedius) along with the blue skate (D. batis) (previously thought to be the same species, the common skate). D. batis can reach 2.85 m (9.4 ft) and 97.1 kg (214 lb), while D. intermedius can grow up to 2.85 m (9.4 ft) and weight 113 kg (249 lb). In North American waters, the largest is the big skate (Beringraja binoculata) of the Pacific Ocean, growing to 2.4 m (7.9 ft), and 91 kg (201 lb).

- Dogfish and allies (Squaliformes)

The largest known member of this order is the Greenland shark (Somniosus microcephalus), a giant predator of sub-Arctic waters. This species has been confirmed to reach as much as 6.4 m (21 ft) in length and a weight of 1,397 kg (3,080 lb), although specimens of up to 7.3 m (24 ft) have been reportedly caught. The Pacific sleeper shark (Somniosus pacificus) has been measured only to 4.4 m (14 ft) and 888 kg (1,958 lb) in a gravid female, although specimens up to an estimated 7 m (23 ft) have been scientifically observed. A single unconfirmed account exists of an enormous Pacific sleeper shark that potentially measured up to 9.2 m (30 ft) long. The Pacific spiny dogfish (Squalus suckleyi), a very common species, reaches the largest sizes of the "true dogfish" family. Specimens have been measured at up to 1.6 m (5.2 ft) and 10 kg (22 lb).

- Angelsharks (Squatiniformes)

The largest of the bottom-dwelling angelsharks (named for their shape rather than disposition) is the common angelshark (Squatina squatina) of the Northeast Atlantic Ocean. This species can grow up to 2.4 m (7.9 ft) long and weigh up to 80 kg (180 lb).

- Electric rays (Torpediniformes)

The largest of the electric rays is Atlantic torpedo (Torpedo nobiliana). This fish can measure 1.8 m (5.9 ft) long and weigh 90 kg (200 lb). However, a length of 0.6–1.5 m (2.0–4.9 ft) and weight of 30 pounds (14 kg) is more typical. Females attain a larger size than males.

=== Spiny sharks (Acanthodii) ===
The largest of the now-extinct Acanthodii was Xylacanthus grandis, an ischnacanthiform based on a ~35 cm (14 in) long jaw bone. Based on the proportions of its relative Ischnacanthus, X. grandis had an estimated total length of 2.5 m (8 ft 2 in).

== Bony fish (Osteichthyes) ==
=== Ray-finned fish (Actinopterygii) ===
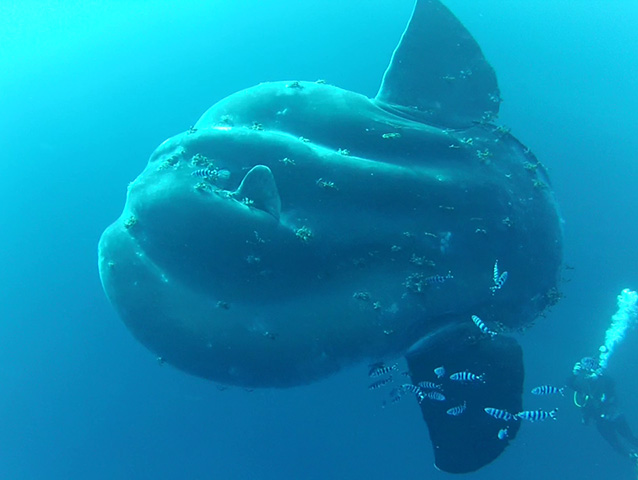
The bumphead sunfish (Mola alexandrini), also known as the giant sunfish, is the heaviest of the bony fish.

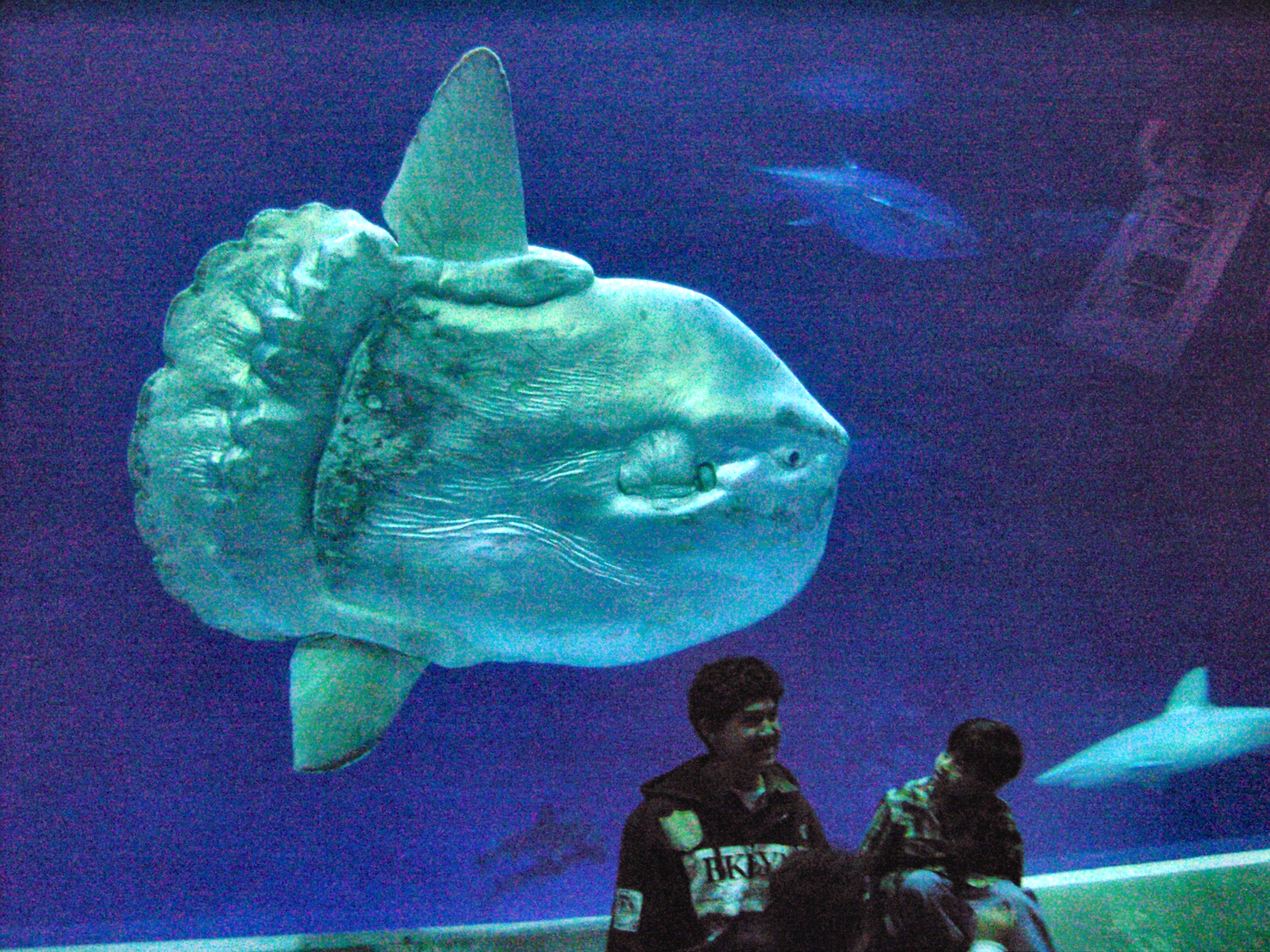
The Ocean sunfish was mistakenly described as the same as Mola alexandrini, the heaviest bony fish.

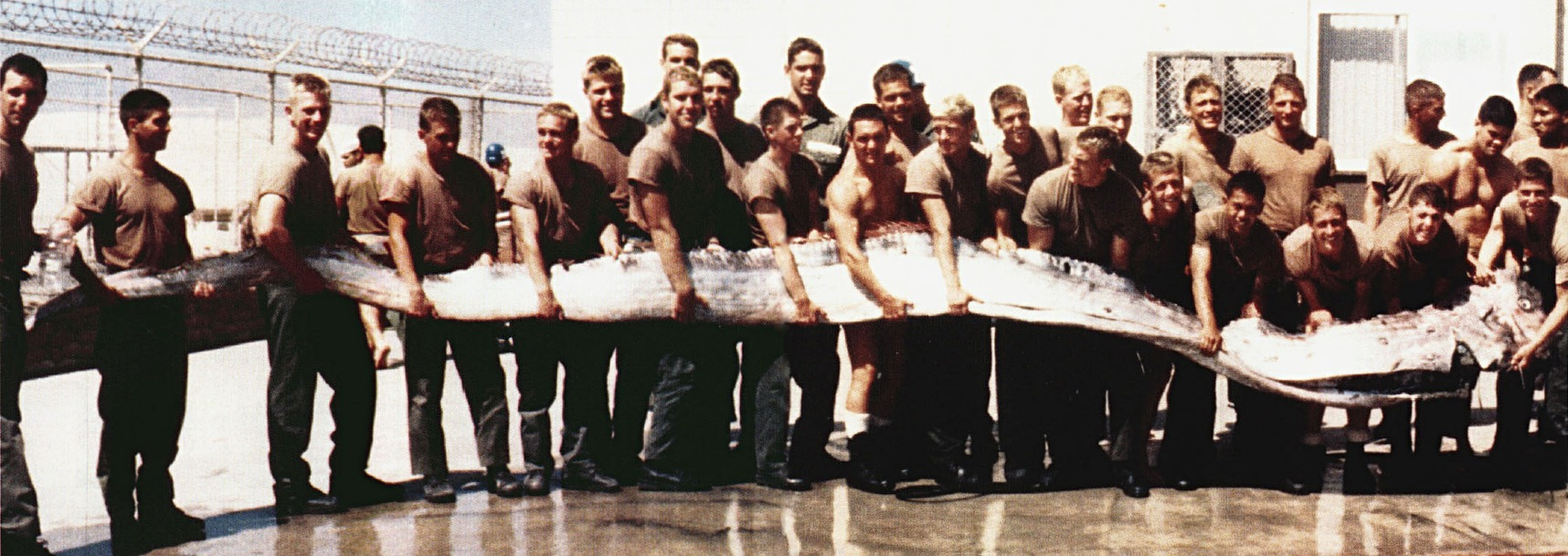
The extremely rare oarfish, the longest of all bony fish

The largest living bony fish (superclass Osteichthyes, which includes both ray-finned and lobe-finned fish) are the lesser known southern sunfish (Mola alexandrini) also known as the giant sunfish, followed by widely distributed and better known ocean sunfish (Mola mola) and, both being members of the order Tetraodontiformes. The largest verified specimen belongs to the southern sunfish discovered dead near the Azores in the Atlantic has set the record for being the largest extant bony fish with the weight of 2,744 kg (6,049 lb). The record size ocean sunfish crashed into a boat off Bird Island, Australia in 1910 and measured 4.3 m (14 ft) from fin-to-fin, 3.1 m (10 ft) in length and weighed about 2,300 kg (5,100 lb), while the other record for the biggest bony fish is yet held by a Mola alexandrini which was also coincidentally 2,300 kg (5,100 lb) in mass and 3 m (9.8 ft) in length, caught off in 1996 and misidentified as a Mola mola.

As for length, the longest extant bony fish on earth is the giant oarfish (Regalecus glesne). Slender and compressed, it averages over 6 m (20 ft) long at maturity. A specimen caught in 1885 of 7.6 m (25 ft) in length weighed 275 kg (606 lb). The longest known example, which was hit by a steamship, was measured as 13.7 m (45 ft) long.

Much larger bony fish existed prehistorically, the largest ever known having been Leedsichthys of the Jurassic period. This species is the largest known bony fish ever and one of the largest non-cetacean marine animals to have ever existed. Estimates of the size of this fish range from 21 to 27 m (69 to 89 ft) and mass from 20 to 50 tons. A maximum size of 22 m (72 ft) and 25–30 tons had been deemed to be most realistic. However, a 2013 study which estimated the maximum size of the animal based on the largest specimens it is estimated that Leedsichthys would have a maximum length of 16.5 metres (54 ft) and a maximum weight of 49 tonnes (108,000 lb).

==== Subclass Chondrostei ====
- Sturgeons and paddlefishes (Acipenseriformes)

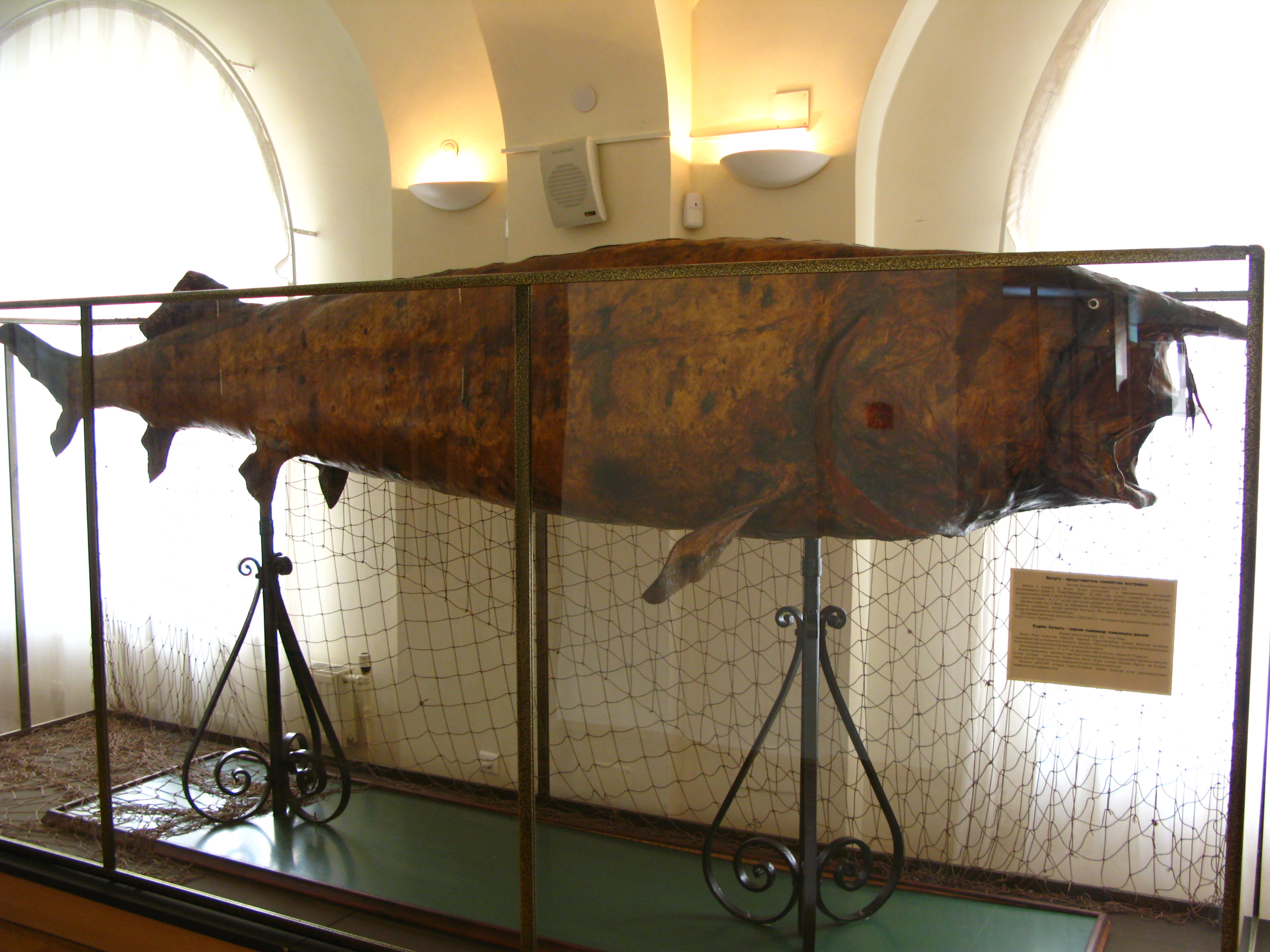
The remains of a 1000 kg beluga sturgeon, one of the largest bony fish

The largest species is the beluga sturgeon (Huso huso) of the Caspian and Black seas, the only extant bony fish to rival the massiveness of the ocean sunfish. The largest specimen considered reliable (based on remains) was caught in the Volga estuary in 1827 and measured 7.3 m (24 ft) and weighed 1,474 kg (3,250 lb). The slightly smaller kaluga (Sinosturio dauricus) or great Siberian sturgeon has been weighed reliably up to 1,140 kg (2,510 lb) (Berg, 1932) and a length of 5.6 m (18 ft). The North American white sturgeon (Sinosturio transmontanus), is unverified to 907 kg (2,000 lb) (more likely to 700 kg (1,500 lb)) and 6.1 m (20 ft), with multiple fish verified at 500 kg (1,100 lb) and 4 m (13 ft). Chinese (S. sinensis) reach 500 kg (1,100 lb) and 5 m (16 ft), European oceanic (Acipenser sturio) 400 kg (880 lb), and the Russian sturgeon (Huso gueldenstaedtii) reach 115 kg (254 lb) respectively. Atlantics (A. oxyrinchus oxyrinchus) with a weight of 360 kg (790 lb) and Baikal sturgeons (Huso baerii) at 210 kg (460 lb) are also considerably large. These fish are sometimes called the largest freshwater fish, but sturgeons spend a great deal of time in brackish water and switch back and forth between saltwater and freshwater environments in their life cycle. Also included in this order are the paddlefish and the Chinese paddlefish (Psephurus gladius), now officially recognized as extinct by the IUCN (as of July 2022), which was also a very large fish. Reportedly, fisherman as recently as the 1950s have caught paddlefish measuring up to 6.7 m (22 ft) in total length, although no specimen greater than 3.1 m (10 ft) has been scientifically measured. The weight of the Chinese paddlefish is reportedly 300 to 500 kg (660 to 1,100 lb).

==== Superorder Elopomorpha ====
- Bonefish (Albuliformes)

The largest Albuliformes is the shortjaw bonefish (Albula glossodonta), which weighs up to 19 lb (8.6 kg) and measures up to 90 cm (35 in) long. It is silvery in color with dusky fins. The bases of the pectoral fins are yellow.

- Eels (Anguilliformes)

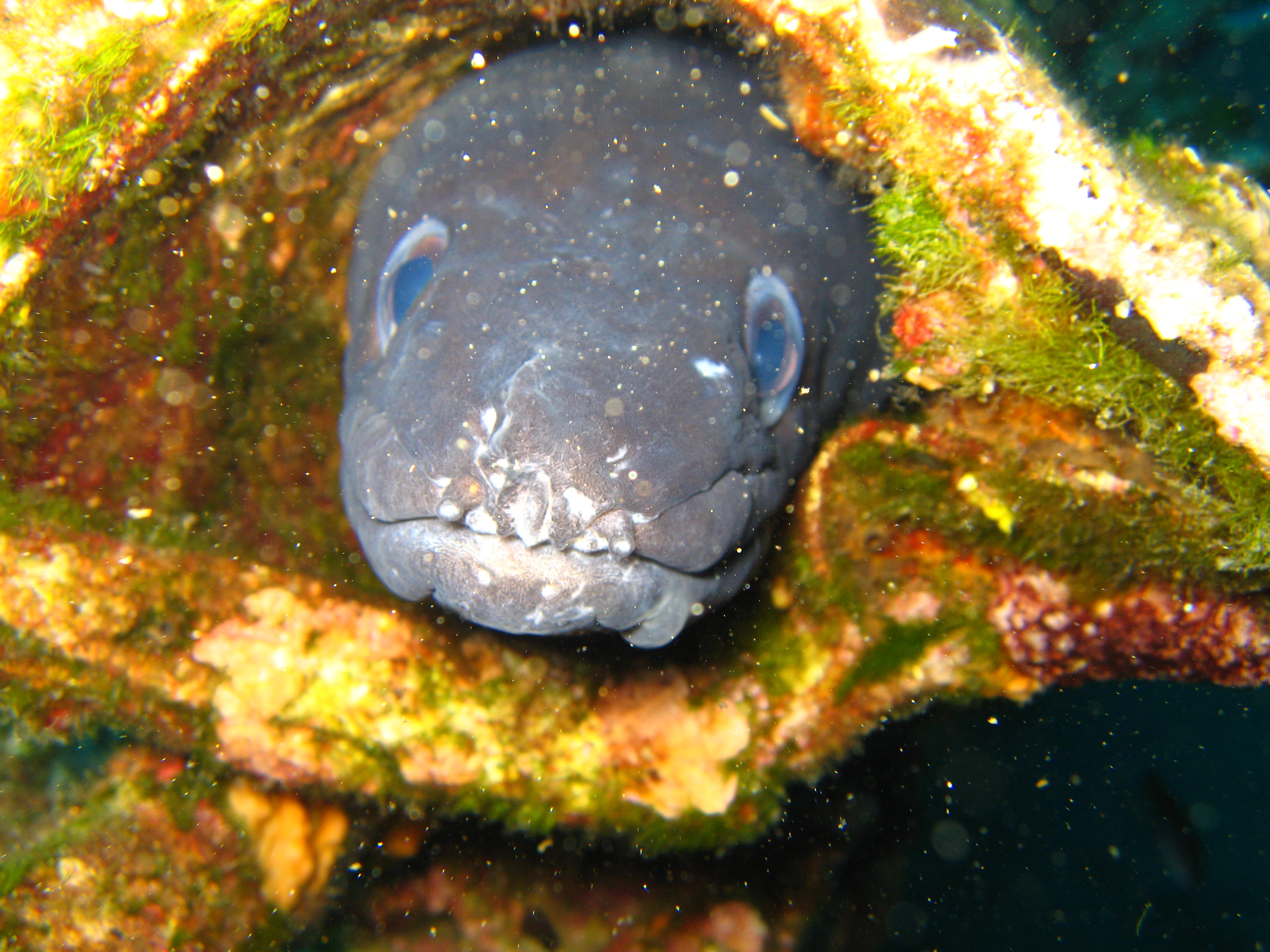
The head of a European conger, the world's most massive eel

The largest species of "true eel," if measured in weight and overall bulk, is the European conger (Conger conger). The maximum size of this species has been reported to 3 m (9.8 ft) and a mass of 110 kg (240 lb), but possibly up to 160 kg (350 lb). Several moray eels can equal or exceed the previous eel in length but do not weigh as much. The longest fish in the order, at up to 4 m (13 ft), is the slender giant moray (Strophidon sathete) of the Indo-Pacific oceans.

- Ladyfish and allies (Elopiformes)

This small order is usually considered closely related to the true eels although its members are very different in appearance and behavior from eels. The largest species is much-coveted-sport fish, the Atlantic tarpon (Megalops atlanticus). The maximum recorded size for this species is 161 kg (355 lb) and a length up to 2.5 m (8.2 ft). The largest caught on rod and reel was 130 kg (286.5 lb).

- Gulper eels (Saccopharyngiformes)

The largest gulper eel is the pelican eel (Eurypharynx pelecanoides). The pelican eel grows to about 1 m (3.3 ft) in length.

==== Infraclass Holostei ====
- Bowfins (Amiiformes)

The bowfin (Amia calva) is one of two extant species of its order, along with the emerald bowfin (Amia ocellicauda.) The most distinctive characteristic of the bowfin is its very long dorsal fin consisting of 145 to 250 rays, and running from mid-back to the base of the tail. The caudal fin is a single lobe, though heterocercal. They can grow up to 109 cm (43 in) in length, and weigh 9.75 kg (21.5 lb).

- Gars (Lepisosteiformes)

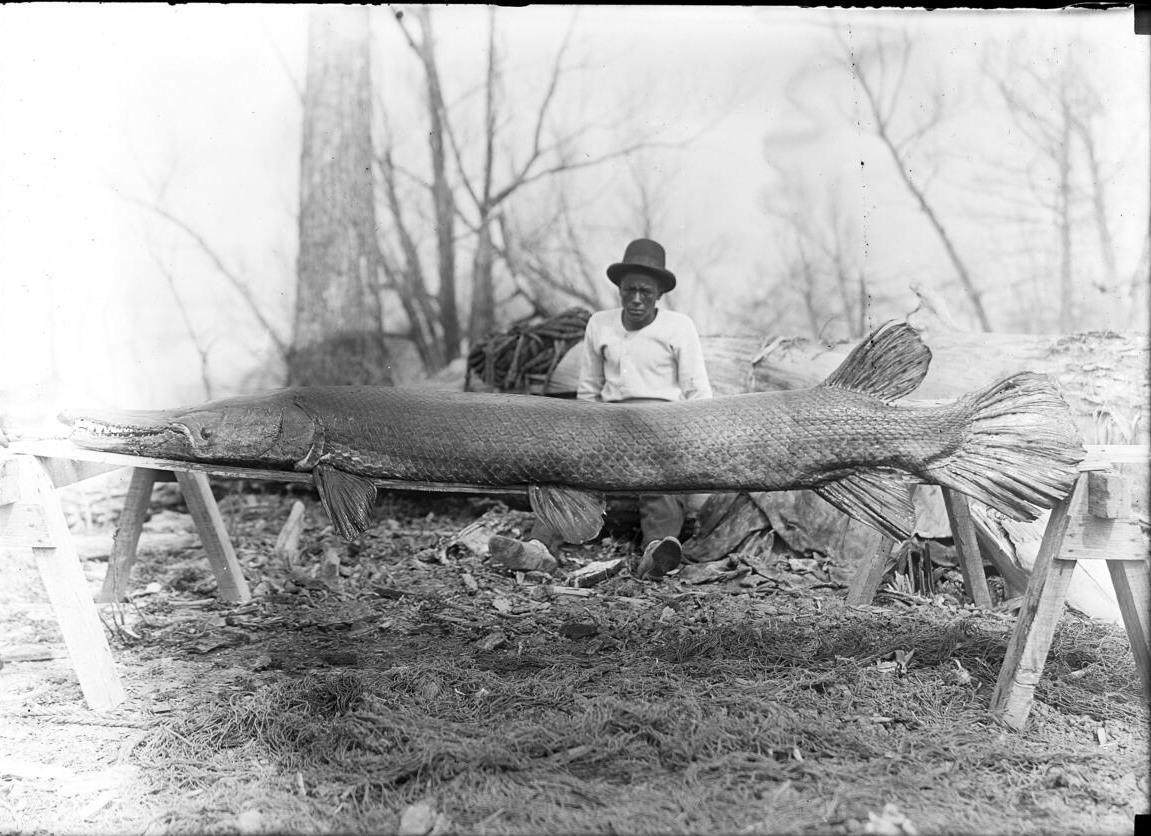
A large alligator gar, the largest freshwater fish in North America

The largest of the gar, and the largest entirely freshwater fish in North America, is the alligator gar (Atractosteus spatula). The previous largest gar ever known, caught in Louisiana in 1925, was 3 m (9.8 ft) in length and weighed 137 kg (302 lb). A more recently caught alligator gar from 2011 was verified to weigh 148.5 kg (327 lb) and was 2.6 m (8.5 ft) long, and may have been between 70 and 95 years.

==== Superorder Protacanthopterygii and allies ====
- Barreleyes, slickheads and argentines (Argentiniformes)

The largest species is the greater argentine (Argentina silus), that can reach 76 centimetres (30 in) TL.
The largest barreleyes are javelin spookfish (Bathylychnops exilis) found in the Northern Pacific and in the eastern Atlantic Ocean near the Azores where it is found at depths of around 640 metres (2,100 ft). This species grows to a length of 50 centimetres (20 in) SL.

- Pikes and allies (Esociformes)

The largest species in this small but interesting order (formerly allied with the salmonids) is the muskellunge (Esox masquinongy) of the rivers and lakes of North America, also commonly known as the musky or muskie. These predatory fish can grow up to 1.8 m (5.9 ft) and 31.8 kg (70 lb).

- Salmon and allies (Salmoniformes)

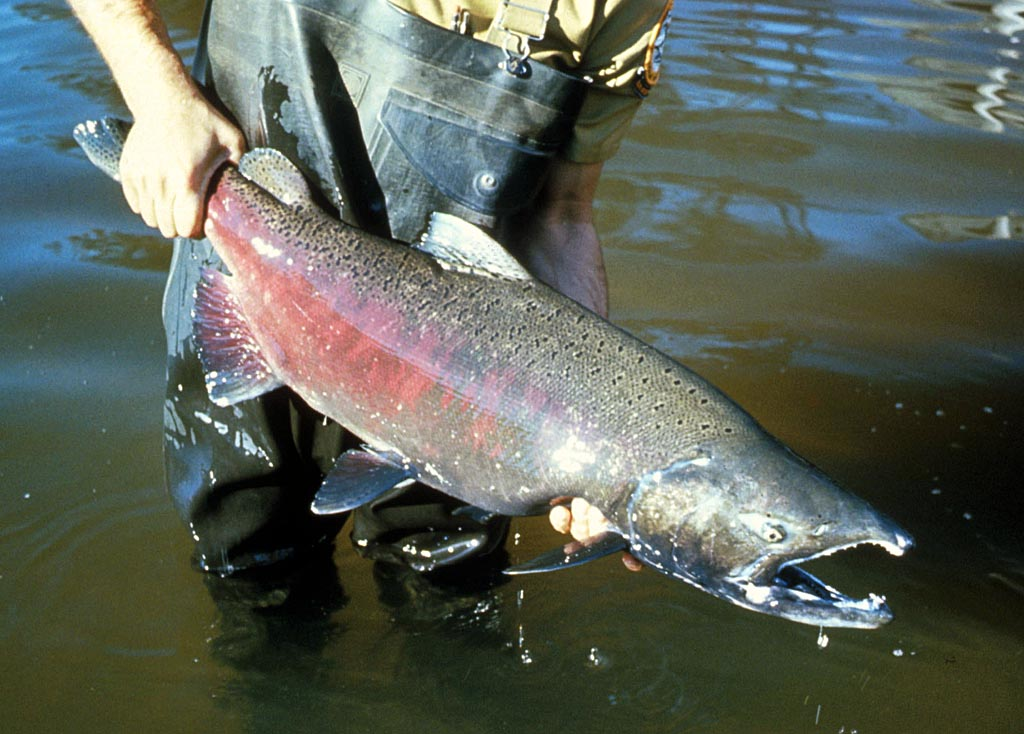
The Chinook salmon is one of the largest species of salmon

The largest species of "true" salmonid is the Siberian taimen (Hucho taimen). The biggest recorded taimen was caught in the Kotui River in Russia, and measured 2.1 m (6.9 ft) and weighed 105 kg (231 lb). Some sources claim the largest is the Chinook salmon (Oncorhynchus tshawytscha) of America's Pacific Northwest, although this species falls behind the taimen in maximum size. The maximum size of this fish is 61.4 kg (135 lb) and 1.5 m (4.9 ft) long.

- Smelts and allies (Osmeriformes)

The largest smelt is the rainbow smelt (Osmerus mordax). The body of the rainbow smelt is slender and cylindrical. When full grown, the rainbow smelt is between 18 and 23 centimetres (7 and 9 in) long and weighs about 85 grams (3.0 oz). Individuals over 12 inches (30 cm) long are known.

- Bristlemouths (Stomiiformes)

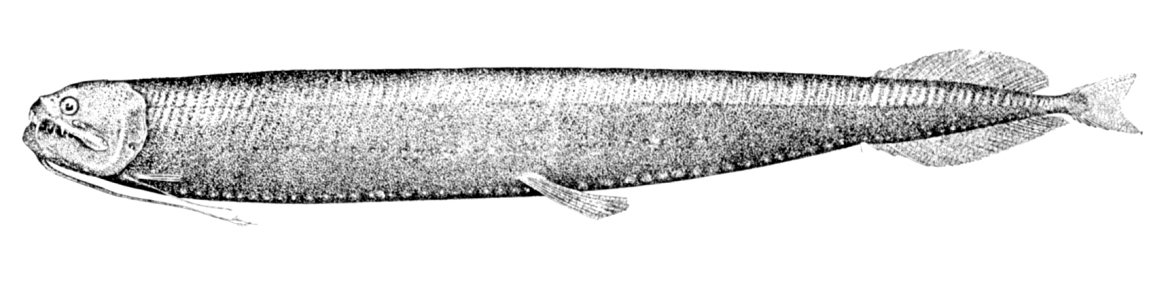
The largest bristlemouth, the short-tailed barbeled dragonfish

The largest of the deep-sea bristlemouths is the short-tailed barbeled dragonfish (Oppostomias micripnus). The top size of a female of this species is probably over 452 g (0.996 lb) and 50 cm (20 in) long. In species like the barbeled dragonfish (Idiacanthus atlanticus), the snake-like females can measure up to 0.5 m (1.6 ft) long, about 50 times as long as the male. Although Idiacanthus is much more slender and is lighter than Oppostomias.

- Jellynose fishes (Ateleopodiformes)

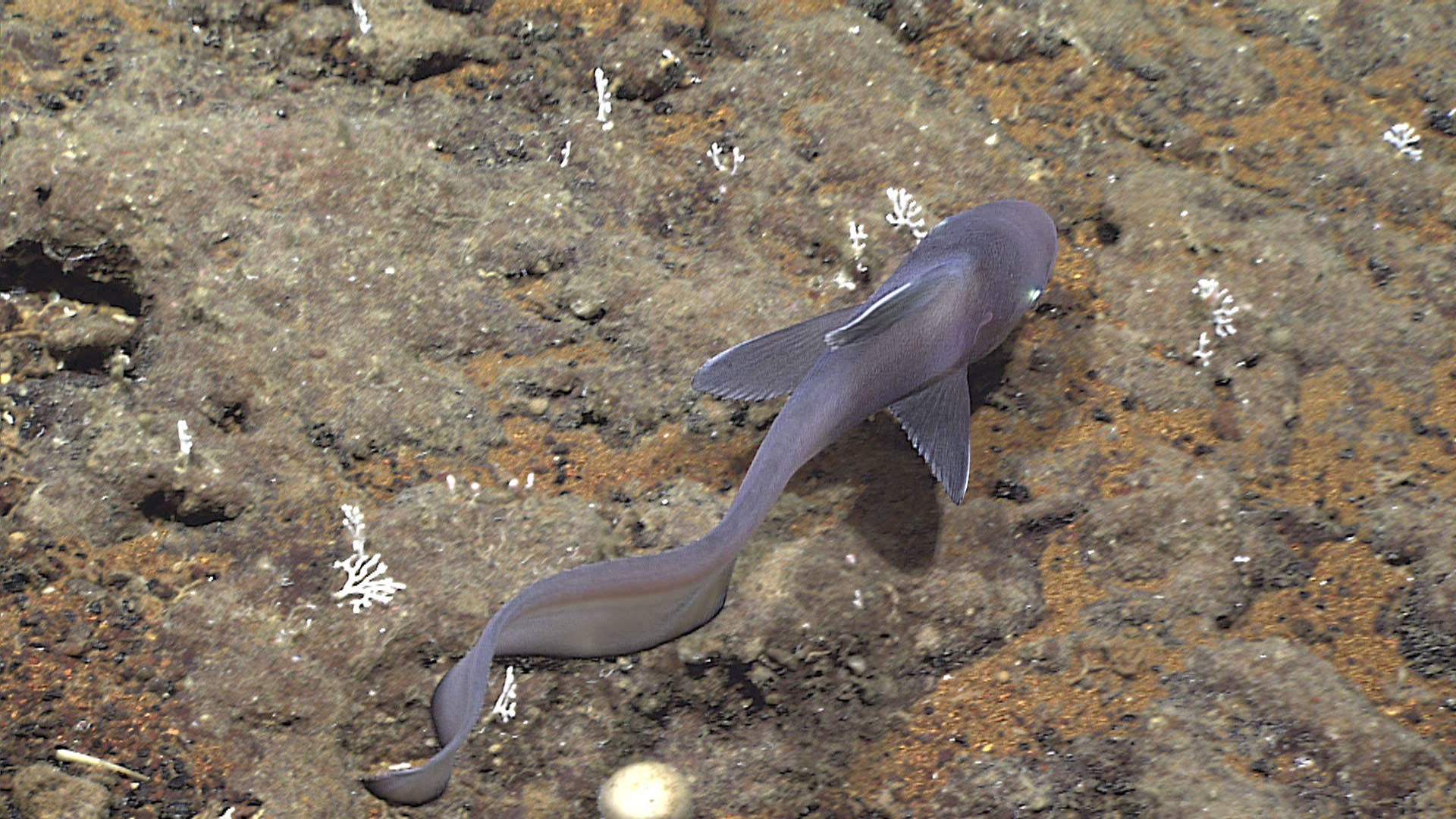
NOAA picture of Ijimaia plicatellus (Ateleopodidae)

Jellynose fish are benthic marine fish typically found at depths around 200 to 600 m (660 to 1,970 ft). This is a small order, containing only 14 species, The largest species is usually cited as the jellynose (Guentherus altivela) which grows to 2 meters (79 in). A more recently described species, Ateleopus edentatus may grow to 4.4 meters (170 in).

- Grinners and lizard fish (Aulopiformes)

The largest member of this order is the longnose lancetfish (Alepisaurus ferox), found in all the world's oceans. Slender, with a huge spine, these fish can reach 2.1 m (6.9 ft) long and can weigh up to 11 kg (24 lb).

==== Superorder Acanthopterygii and the Clade Percomorpha ====
This superorder Acanthopterygii, meaning "spiny-finned one", encompasses over half of all known ray-finned fish species (usually cited as 17,000-20,000 of the approximate 35,000-37,000 known extant species in Actinopterygii). It includes two major series/clades, being Percomorpha and Berycida, where all but around 200 species are under Percomorpha. Therefore, this section is divided partially into subsections for further organization. Several of these orders have also been placed under Perciformes as suborders.

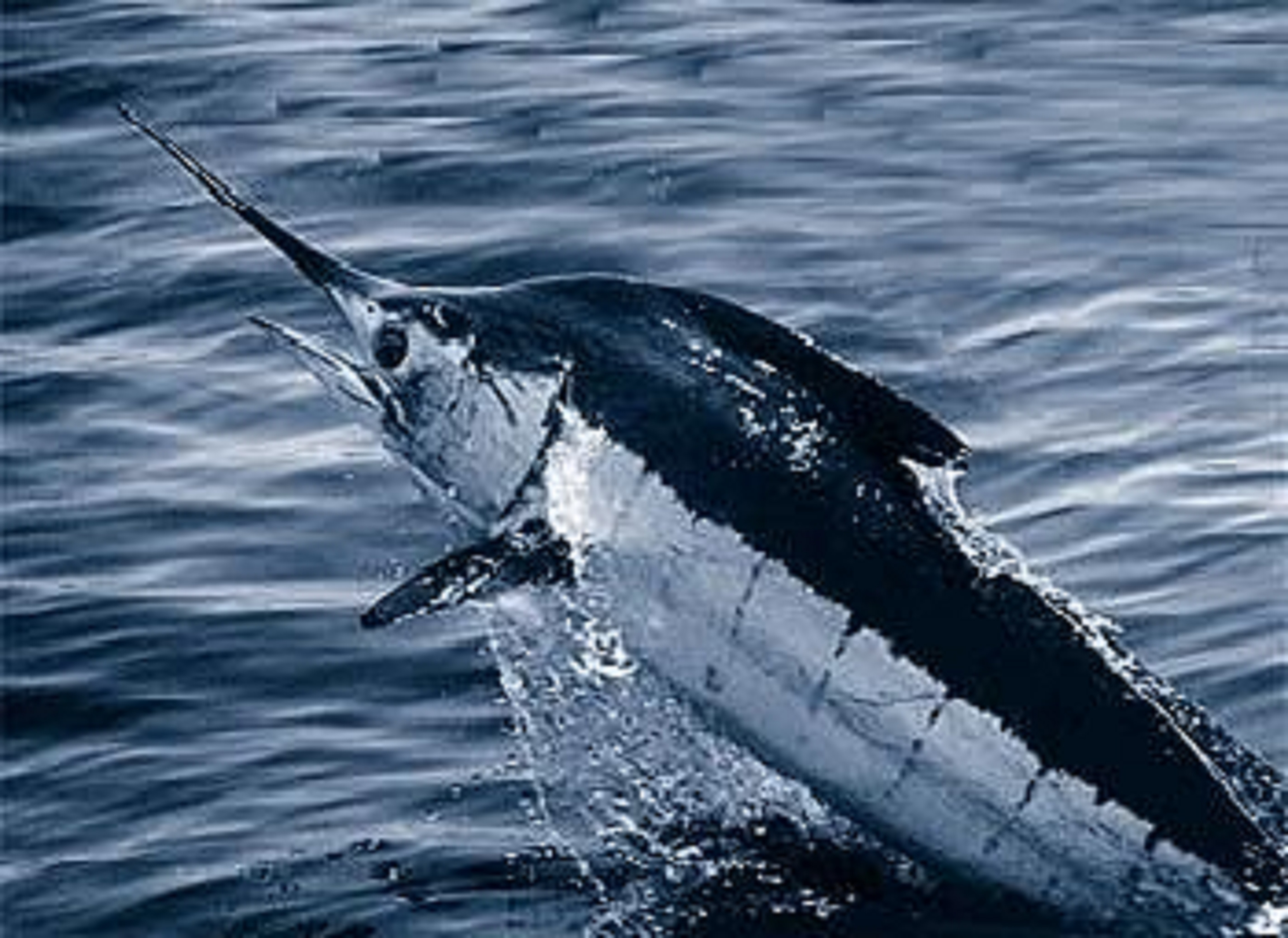
The Atlantic blue marlin is one of the largest species of the perch-like fish

The title of the largest members of this order, the most numerous order of all vertebrates, is the aforementioned sunfish of the family Molidae. However, the largest of those considered to have more traditional fish morphology is a matter of some debate. A large marlin is the biggest of these fishes: the black marlin (Istiompax indica) of the Indo-Pacific, the Atlantic blue marlin (Makaira nigricans) and the Indo-Pacific blue marlin (Makaira mazara). All of these similarly sized species can exceptionally reach up to 5 m (16 ft) in length and weight may be as much as 907 kg (2,000 lb), or even an estimated 1,360 kg (3,000 lb) with rumors of even larger marlins existing.
Another notable giant of the perch order is the Atlantic bluefin tuna (Thunnus thynnus) of the Northern Atlantic Ocean, which has been verified at up to 4.4 m (14 ft) and 679 kg (1,497 lb), although can reportedly reach 910 kg (2,010 lb).
The swordfish (Xiphias gladius) can reach a maximum weight of 650 kg (1,430 lb) and length of 4.5 m (15 ft).
Due to heavy fishing of both groups, billfish and tuna of the genus Thunnus of great sizes are increasingly rare.

===== Perches, groupers, sea basses, and allies (Suborder Percoidei) =====
- Perches, pike-perches, ruffles, and darters (Percidae)

Within the Percidae family, namesake of the Perciformes order, the largest fish is the zander (Sander lucioperca) which can weigh up to 18.7 kilograms (41 lb 4 oz). The popular North American walleye (Sander vitreus) can reach a maximum weight of 11.5 kilograms (25 lb). The freckled darter (Percina lenticula) of the United States, is the biggest of the darters (subfamily Etheostomatinae), reaching 20 cm (7.9 in) and 70 g (2.5 oz).

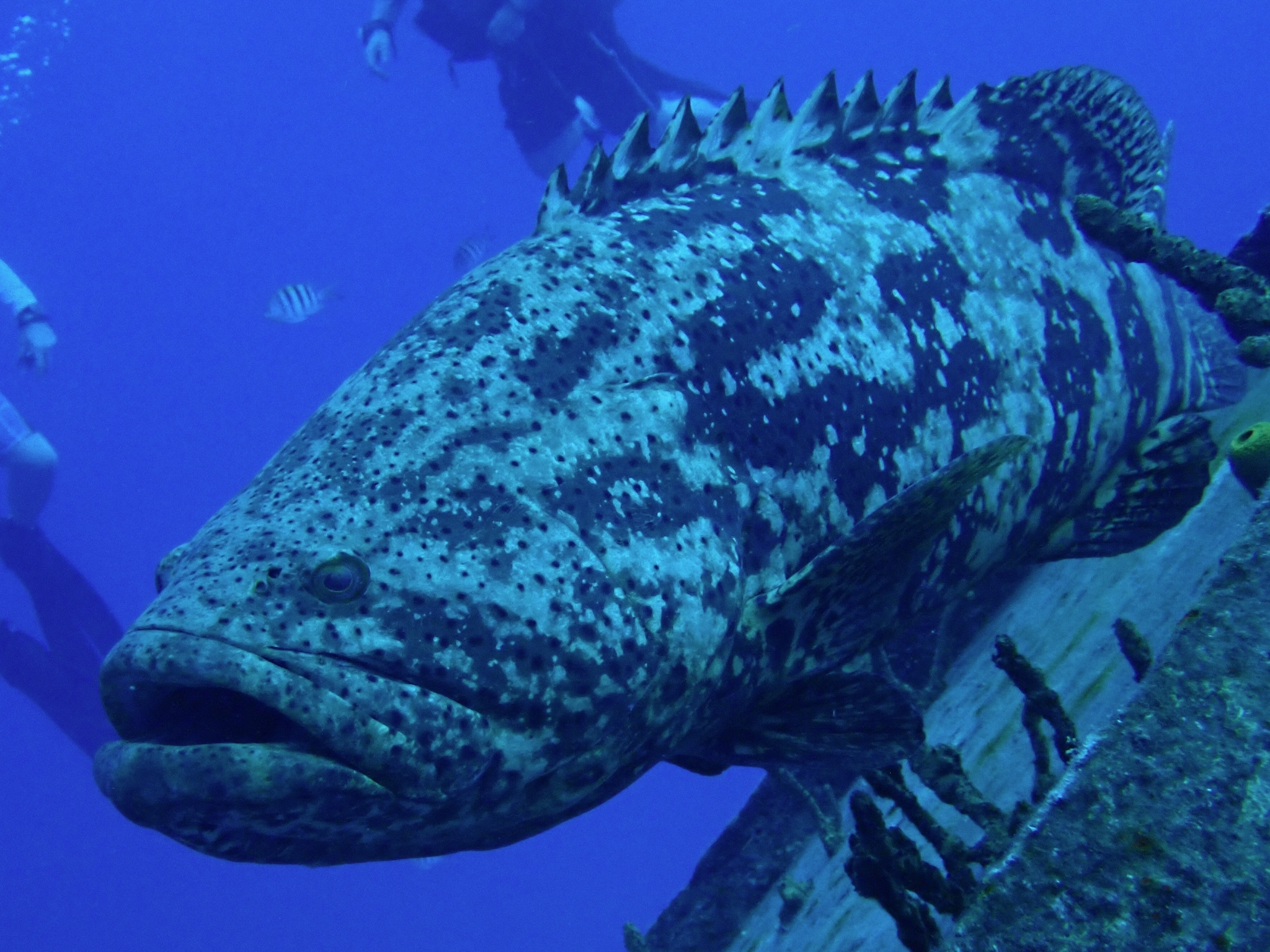
A large goliath grouper

- Groupers (Epinephelidae)

Among the groupers, many of which can grow quite large, the greatest size are reached in the Atlantic goliath grouper (Epinephelus itajara) and the giant grouper (Epinephelus lanceolatus), also known as the Queensland grouper. Both can reach a maximum known length of 2.6 m (8.5 ft) and weight of 455 kg (1,003 lb) and 400 kg (880 lb) respectively.

===== Sculpins, Lionfish, Rockfish, and allies (Order Scorpaeniformes) (Note: Now widely considered a part of the order Perciformes) =====
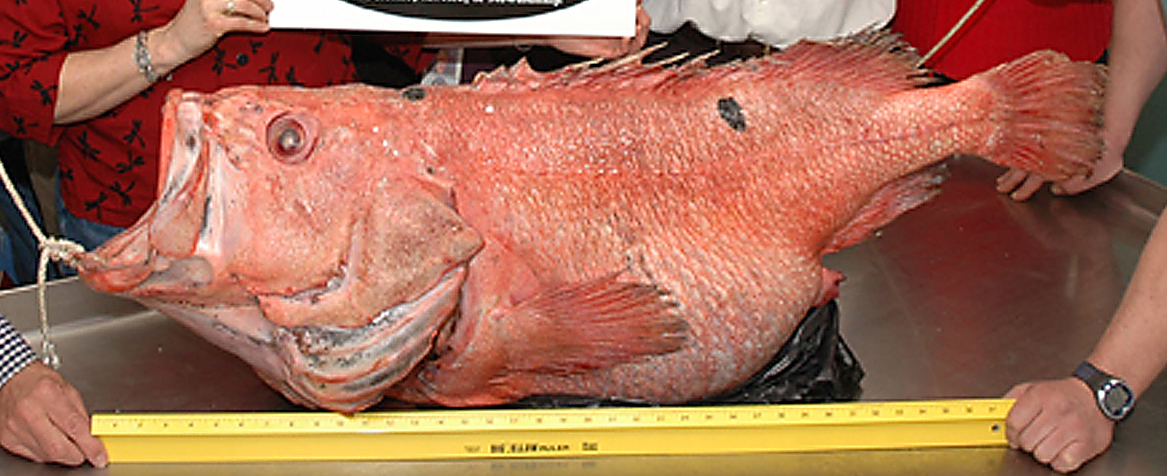
Largest recorded shortraker rockfish, weighing 28 kg (62 lb), and may have been as old as 150 years.

The order Scorpaeniformes, known for their venomous spines and benthic lifestyle, has a large variety of subfamilies and over 1320 species. This order has also been classified as a suborder under perciformes as Scorpaenoidei.
Although less venomous than many smaller fish in the same order, the skilfish (Erilepis zonifer) of the North Pacific, is largest of the Scorpaeniformes. The maximum size is 2.01 m (6.6 ft) and the weight can be up to 100 kg (220 lb). The Lingcod (Ophiodon elongatus) of the west coast of North America is sometimes listed as the largest in the order, but it is not known to exceed 1.5 m (4.9 ft) in length or 60 kg (130 lb) in weight, which still makes it the largest of the Hexagrammidae.

- Sticklebacks and allies (Gasterosteiformes)

The largest form of stickleback, a small, cylindric type of fish, is the sea stickleback or fifteenspine stickleback (Spinachia spinachia). This species can range up to 22 cm (8.7 in) in length and weigh up to 8.5 g (0.30 oz).

- Flatheads (Platycephalidae)

The largest flathead is the dusky flathead (Platycephalus fuscus) growing to 120 cm (47 in) and 15 kg (33 lb).

- Scorpionfish and allies (Scorpaenidae)

For the Scorpaenidae family, which includes rockfish, lionfish, and stonefish, is the extremely long-lived shortraker rockfish (Sebastes borealis) reaching 120 cm (47 in) and at least 20 kg (44 lb), with one specimen reported at 28 kg (62 lb).

- Sculpins (Cottoidea)

The Cottoidea superfamily, also known as the sculpins (with most species in the cottidae and psychrolutidae families), has its largest species in the cabezon (Scorpaenicthys marmoratus) of coastal North America, which can range up to 99 cm (39 in) and 14 kg (31 lb).

- Wolffishes, gunnels and eelpouts (Zoarcoidei)

In this suborder, which includes the pricklebacks and wolf fish, the largest is the Atlantic wolffish (Anarhichas lupus) at 23.6 kg (52 lb) and 1.5 m (4.9 ft). Other large species in this suborder include the wolf eel (Anarrhichthys ocellatus) at up to 18.4 kg (41 lb) and 2.4 m (7.9 ft), and the giant wrymouth (Cryptacanthodes giganteus) at 1.6 m (5.2 ft).

===== Mackerels, Tunas, Butterfishes, and Allies (Order Scombriformes) =====
- Tunas and allies (Scombridae)

The largest is the aforementioned Atlantic Bluefin Tuna (Thunnus thynnus) at 679 kg (1,497 lb). Another notable species is the Pacific bluefin tuna (Thunnus orientalis) It may reach as much as 3 m (9.8 ft) in length and 450 kg (990 lb) in weight.

The Spanish mackerels (Scomberomorini) reach their maximum size in the Chinese mackerel (Scomberomorus sinensis), which can attain a size of 131 kg (289 lb) and 2.47 m (8.1 ft). Related to the true Spanish mackerels in Scomberomorus, the wahoo (Acanthocybium solandri) can reach 83.5 kg (184 lb) and 2.5 m (8.2 ft). They are closely related to tunas of the tribe Thunnini.

The small tribe of bonitos (Sardini) which is also closely related to tuna, contains 8 species in 4 genera, with most as true bonitos in Sarda. All grow to a maximum size under 13 kg (29 lb), with the exception of the dogtooth tuna (Gymnosarda unicolor), which grows to 2.48 m (8.1 ft) and 130 kg (290 lb).

- Pomfrets (Bramidae)

The largest pomfret is the deep sea dwelling big-scale pomfret (Taractichthys longipinnis) at 21.4 kg (47 lb) and 100 cm (39 in). Although resembling the butterfish of Stromateidae, the pomfrets are in a separate suborder (although some in Stromateidae are called pomfrets).

- Snake Mackerels (Gempylidae)

The oilfish (Ruvettus pretiosus), attaining 3 m (9.8 ft) and 63.5 kg (140 lb), is the largest of the snake mackerels. Another notable fish is the elongated snoek (Leionura atun) at 2 m (6.6 ft) but only 6 kg (13 lb). A related fish (which is sometimes placed in the monotypic family Lepidocybiidae, and sometimes under Gempylidae) is the escolar (Lepidocybium flavobrunneum), 2 m (6.6 ft) reaching and 45 kg (99 lb).

- Cutlass fishes (Trichiuridae)
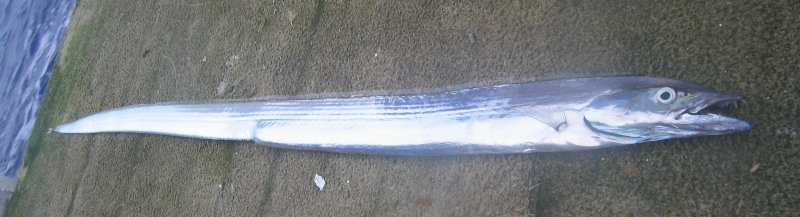
  A razorback scabbardfish

The largest species in this very odd-looking family, known for their shiny elongated bodies and sharp teeth, is the razorback scabbardfish (Assurger anzac), growing to 2.5 m (8.2 ft).

- Stromateales (Stromateoidei)

The largest of this suborder likely the bluenose warehou (Hyperoglyphe antarctica) which reaches 140 cm (55 in) and 61 kg (134 lb), additionally making it the largest of the medusa fish family Centrolophidae. Some other large fish in Centrolophidae include the black ruff/rudderfish (Centrolophus niger) at 150 cm (59 in) and Schedophilus griseolineatus growing to 256 cm (101 in). Still, this suborder mostly consists of small fish, primarily butterfish of the family Stromateidae (although some in Centrolophidae are also called butterfish) with its largest species as the Silver pomfret (Pampus argenteus) reaching 60 cm (24 in) and the longfin cigarfish (Cubiceps paradoxus) at 127 cm (50 in) as the biggest in the driftfish family Nomeidae.

===== Jacks, Flounders, Barracudas, and Allies (Order Carangiformes) =====
- Billfish (Istiophoridae)

The largest of this family (and larger Carangiformes order) is the aforementioned blue marlins of the genus Makaira (as the Indo-Pacific blue marlin and Atlantic blue marlin are sometimes considered the same species) apparently up to 1,000 kg (2,200 lb), and the black marlin (Istiompax indica) verified at 708 kg (1,561 lb) reportedly up to 750 kg (1,650 lb). One Pacific blue marlin caught in Hawaii, named "Choy's monster", was 819 kg (1,806 lb) and likely the largest caught on rod and reel. Some marlin caught by commercial fisheries have been speculated to weigh over 1,360 kg (3,000 lb).

- Giant perches, snooks, barracudas, and allies (Centropomoidei)

One of the largest freshwater fishes is the Nile perch (Lates niloticus), which grows up to 200 kg (440 lb) and 2 m (6.6 ft), and is the largest of the suborder Centropomoidei. The Lates genus includes other large freshwater fish, such as the barramundi (Lates calcarifer) verified to 45 kg (99 lb) (possibly to 60 kg (130 lb)) and the Tanganyika lates (Lates angustifrons) at 100 kg (220 lb).
Also in this suborder, the largest barracuda is the great barracuda (Sphyraena barracuda) reaching 50 kg (110 lb), and the largest snook is the Pacific black snook (Centropomus nigrescens) reaching up to 33 kg (73 lb).

- Flatfish (Pleuronectiformes)

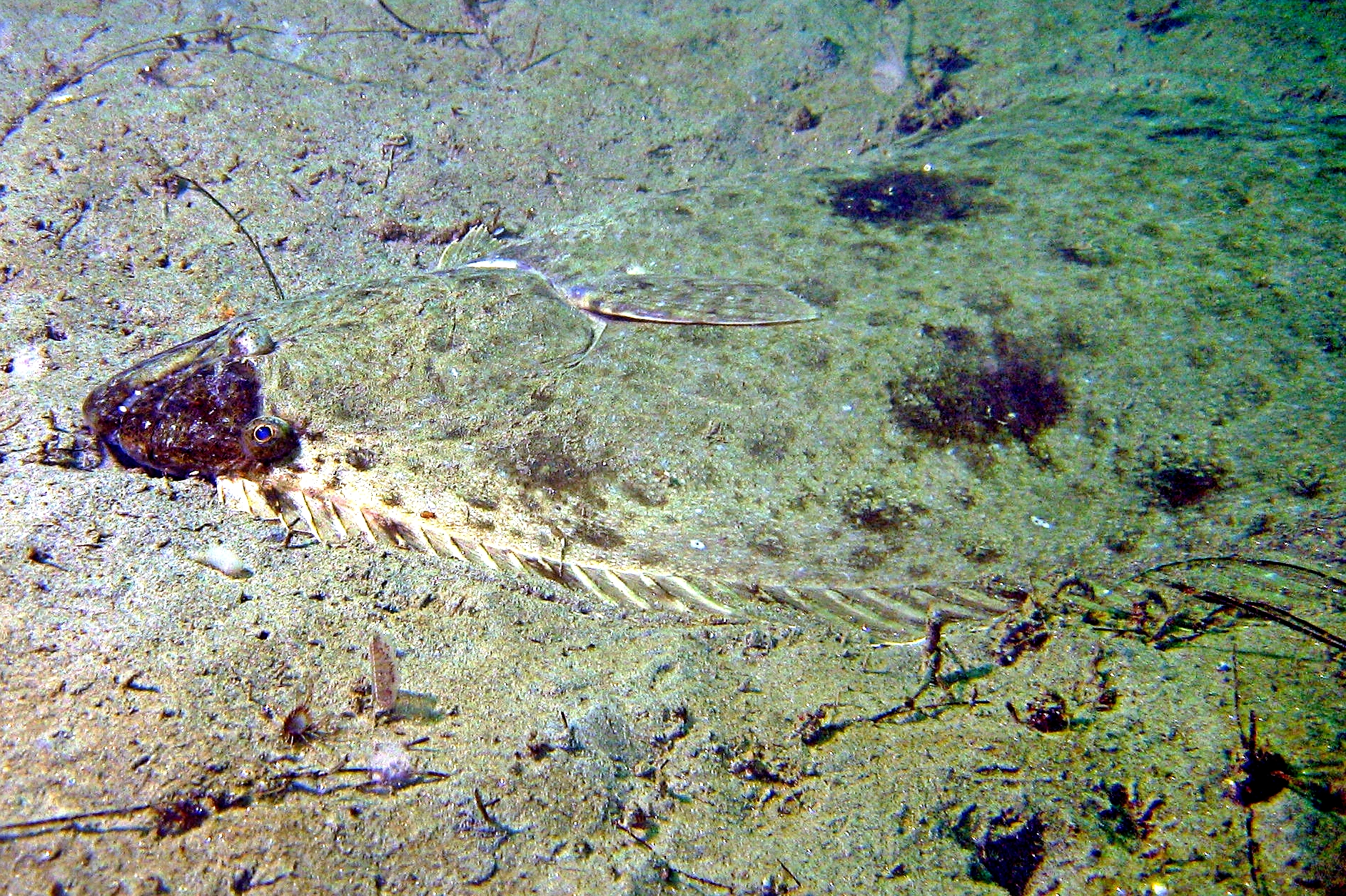
The Pacific halibut, largest of the flatfish, displays its effective camouflage

- The largest of the well-known and heavily fished flatfish is the Pacific halibut (Hippoglossus stenolepis). This giant can reach 363 kg (800 lb) (recently verified to 234 kg (516 lb)) and 3 m (9.8 ft), although fish even approaching this size would be extraordinary these days. A photo exists of a 430 kg (950 lb) 3.5 m (11 ft) Pacific halibut, caught near Pelican, Alaska in 1956. The Atlantic halibut (Hippoglossus hippoglossus) is also sometimes titled the largest flatfish, although it has a slightly smaller maximum size, at 320 kg (710 lb) and 2.8 m (9.2 ft). On average, the Atlantic halibut is larger.

- Trevallies, jacks, and jack mackerels (Carangidae)

The largest of this diverse family is the greater amberjack (Seriola dumerili) reaching a maximum weight of 102 kg (225 lb), with one fish reported as large as 110 kg (240 lb) and 2.18 m (7.2 ft). The giant trevally (Caranx ignobilis) is often also cited as the largest in Carangidae, and can reach a weight of 80.5 kg (177 lb), still making it the largest of the subfamily Caranginae.

- Cobias (Rachycentridae)

The largest (and smallest, as it is the only extant member) of this family is the cobia (Rachycentron canadum), reaching 79.6 kg (175 lb) and 2.03 m (6.7 ft).

- Dolphin fish (Coryphaenidae)

The largest of the two species in this family is the mahi-mahi or common dolphin (Coryphaena hippurus) fish at up to 40 kg (88 lb) and 2.1 m (6.9 ft).

===== Order Acanthuriformes =====
- Snappers (Lutjanidae)

The biggest of snappers is the cubera snapper (Lutjanus cyanopterus) of the Caribbean Sea and east coast of South America, at a maximum size of 57 kg (126 lb) and 1.6 m (5.2 ft) in length.

- Temperate basses (Moronidae)

Largest of the temperate basses is the striped bass (Morone saxatilis) which reaches a maximum size of 57 kg (126 lb), with the largest verified on rod and reel being 37.16 kilograms (81 lb 15 oz) and 1.45 m (4.8 ft).

- Grunts (Haemulidae)

The largest species of grunt is the white margate (Haemulon album) of the Caribbean Sea and east coast of South America, at up to 7.14 kg (15.7 lb) and 0.8 m (2.6 ft) in length.

- Drums and croakers (Sciaenidae)

The largest drum/croaker is the totoaba (Totoaba macdonaldi) of the Gulf of California, at up to 100 kg (220 lb) and 2 m (6.6 ft) long. Some other notable large fish from this family are the mulloway/dusky kob (Argyrosomus japonicus) reaching a max size of 82 kg (181 lb), the black drum (Pogonias cromis), reaching a size of 51 kg (112 lb) but possibly up to 66 kg (146 lb), and the red drum (Sciaenops ocellatus) with a size of 43 kg (95 lb).

- Butterflyfish (Chaetodontidae)

The largest butterflyfish are either the lined butterflyfish (Chaetodon lineolatus) or the saddle butterflyfish (C. ephippium), both of the Indo-Pacific and both of which can measure up to 30 cm (12 in).

===== Order Centrarchiformes =====
- Temperate perches (Percichthyidae)

In the large Centrarchiformes order, the largest species is the Murray cod (Maccullochella peelii), which has been known to reach a size of 1.83 m (6.0 ft) and 113 kg (249 lb), although larger fish have been rumored.

- Freshwater sunfish and black basses (Centrarchidae)

Also in this order, the many sought after gamefish in the Centrarchidae family includes the popular largemouth bass (Micropterus nigricans) (previously merged with the Florida bass (Micropterus salmoides)) with a maximum weight of 11.4 kg (25 lb). The largest caught without snagging on hook and line was 10.1 kg (22 lb), and reports from Cuba speculate bass as large as 13.5 kg (30 lb), where largemouth thrive without natural predators and competition.

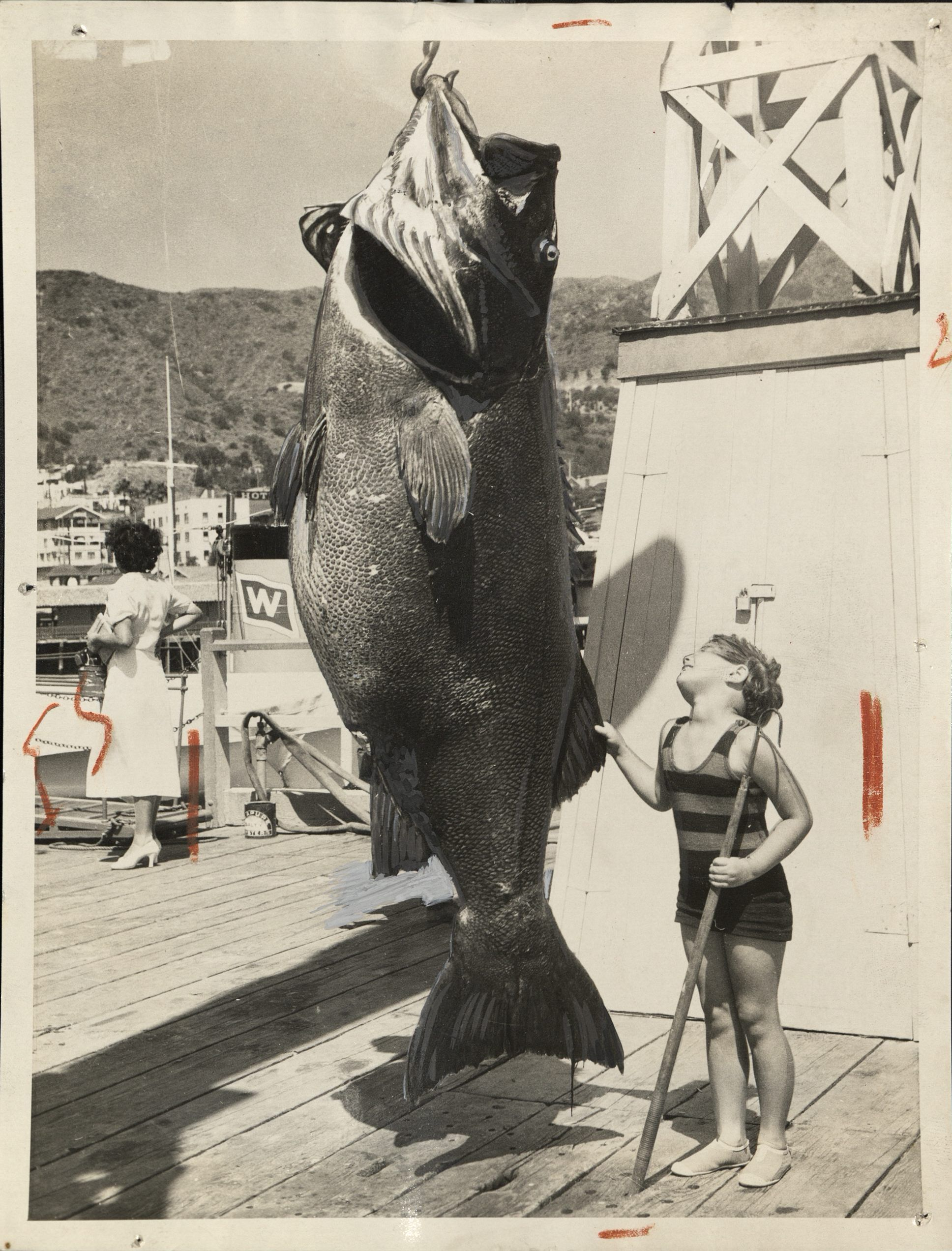
A recently caught giant sea bass in California

===== Oceanic basses (Order Acropmatiformes) =====
- Giant sea basses (Stereolepididae)

The giant seabass (Stereolepis gigas) of the Pacific ocean, the largest of the Acropomatiformes order, can attain a maximum published size of 255 kg (562 lb) but may reach up to 270 kg (600 lb), with a maximum length of 2.3 m (7.5 ft).:

===== Wrasses and allies (Order Labriformes) =====
- Wrasses and parrotfish (Labridae)

The humphead wrasse (Cheilinus undulatus) of the Indo-Pacific's coral reefs is by far the largest in the Labridae (Wrasse) family. It can reach a maximum size of 191 kg (421 lb) and 2.3 m (7.5 ft). Another notable fish in the family and the largest of the parrotfish is the green humphead parrotfish (Bolbometopon muricatum) which can attain sizes of 75 kg (165 lb) and 1.5 m (4.9 ft).

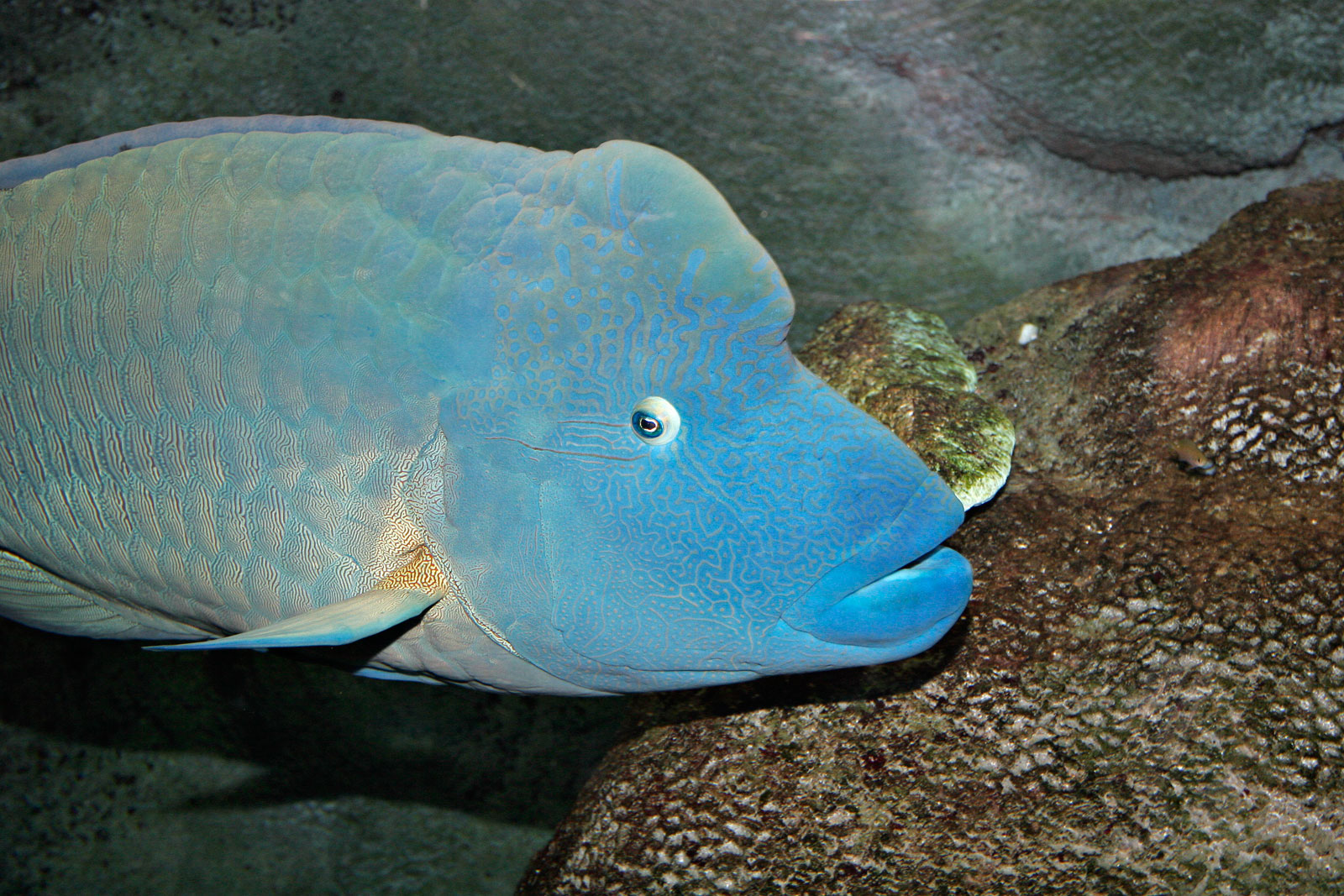
A humphead wrasse

- Stargazers (Uranoscopidae)

The largest stargazer, a group known for an upwards facing head and electric organs, is the giant stargazer (Kathetostoma giganteum) at up to 0.9 m (3.0 ft).

===== Clade/Subseries Ovalentaria =====
- Flying-fish and allies (Beloniformes)

The largest member of this order, best known for its members' ability to breach the water and glide through the sky, is the pelagic houndfish (Tylosurus crocodilus), a slender fish at up to 1.5 m (4.9 ft) and a weight of 6.35 kg (14.0 lb). The largest true "flying fish" is the Japanese flying fish (Cheilopogon pinnatibarbatus japonicus), which can range up to 0.5 m (1.6 ft) in length and weigh over 1 kg (2.2 lb).

- Blennies and allies (Blenniiformes)

The true blennies of the suborder Blennioidei is often considered the hairtail blenny (Xiphasia setifer) of the Indo-Pacific reaching up to 55 cm (22 in), as well as the giant kelpfish (Heterostichus rostratus) at up to 61 cm (24 in).

The largest species of surfperch is the rubberlip surfperch (Rhacochilus toxotes) which reaches sizes of 47 cm (18.5 in) and can weigh 2.25 kg (5.0 lb). Another notable species is the barred surfperch (Amphistichus argenteus) which can reach a length of 49.5 cm (19.5 in) with a weight of 2.15 kg (4.7 lb).

Among a fairly small-bodied family, the damselfishes and anemonefishes, the Garibaldi (Hypsypops rubicundus) of the Pacific coast of North America is the biggest, reaching up to 35.5 cm (14.0 in) and 1.2 kg (2.6 lb).

- Cichlids and allies (Cichliformes)

The species-rich cichlids reach their maximum size in the speckled peacock bass (Cichla temensis) reaching 0.94 m (3.1 ft) and 11.5 kg (25 lb). Another species of cichlid, the largest in the extremely large subfamily of African cichlids (Pseudocrenilabrinae) containing around 1100 species, is the East African giant cichlid (Boulengerochromis microlepis) at up to 0.9 m (3.0 ft) long and 5 kg (11 lb).

- Silversides (Atheriniformes)

An order best known for its tiny representatives, the Argentinian silverside (Odontesthes bonariensis) is found primary in the freshwater bodies and brackish estuaries of Argentina and Chile, but also along the Argentinian coast. It is known locally as "pejerrey," a combination of the Spanish words for "fish" pez and "king" rey. The confirmed record stands at 76 cm (30 in) and 3.6 kg (7.9 lb), yet there are unconfirmed reports of the fish reaching up to 82 cm (32 in) and 6.3 kg (14 lb). The largest North American species of silverside is the jacksmelt (Atherinopsis californiensis) of the Eastern Pacific Ocean. It often reaches a maximum size of 49 cm (19 in), but possibly up to 55 cm (22 in), with the largest recorded being 680 g (1.50 lb).

- Killifish and allies (Cyprinodontiformes)

The largest species in this relatively small-bodied order is the Pacific four-eyed fish (Anableps dowei), reaching a size of 34 cm (13 in) and 588 g (1.296 lb).

- Clingfish (Gobiesociformes)

These bottom-dwelling fish reach their maximum size in Sicyases sanguineus. This species can reach 30 cm (12 in) in length and weigh up to 1 kg (2.2 lb).

- Mullets (Mugiliformes)

The largest is the flathead mullet (Mugil cephalus), also known as the striped mullet, which have dark centers which give the appearance of a series (6–7) of dark horizontal stripes. The fish grow to lengths up to 120 cm (47 in) with weights as high as 8 kg (18 lb). Another large fish is the thicklip mullet (Chelon labrosus) which reaches a max size of 75 cm (30 in) and a weight of 4.5 kg (9.9 lb).

===== Series Berycida =====
- Squirrelfish (Beryciformes)

Best known for their highly poisonous barbs, the squirrelfish's largest representative is the giant squirrelfish (Sargocentron spiniferum) of the Indo-Pacific, at up to 51 cm (20 in) and 2.6 kg (5.7 lb). The slimmer Holocentrus adscensionis from warm parts of the Atlantic can reach even greater lengths of up to 61 cm (24 in).

- Whalefish (Cetomimiformes)

Known for flesh that feels flabby to the touch, this order reaches largest sizes in the flabby whalefish (Gyrinomimus grahami) of all southern oceans. This species, which can range up to 0.45 m (1.5 ft) in length and weigh 1.5 kg (3.3 lb), is sometimes commercially fished.

- Ridgeheads and allies (Stephanoberyciformes)

The largest ridgehead is Poromitra curilensis, a Pacific ridgehead related to the crested bigscale, at up to 18 centimetres standard length (SL; a measurement excluding the caudal fin). Most ridgeheads are well under 10 cm (3.9 in) SL.

- Beardfish (Polymixiiformes)

The little-known beardfish are sometimes classified with the Beryciformes. The largest beardfish is Polymixia busakhini of the Indo-Pacific, which can range up to 0.6 m (2.0 ft) in length.

===== Also under Percomorpha =====
- Toadfish (Batrachoidiformes)

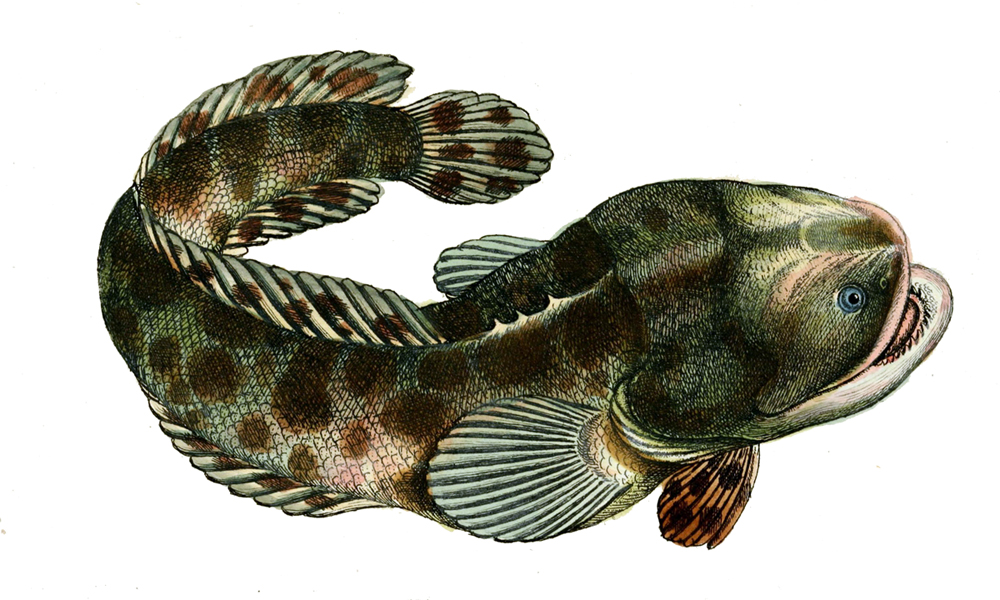
The largest toadfish, the Pacuma toadfish

The largest toadfish is the Pacuma toadfish (Batrachoides surinamensis), reaching a size of up to 2.4 kg (5.3 lb) and 58 cm (23 in).

- Anglerfish (Lophiiformes)

The largest of this diverse order is the common goosefish (Lophius piscatorius), also known as the common monkfish, found in the Northeastern Atlantic off Europe and North Africa. This big-mouthed fish can attain a size of 58 kg (128 lb) and a length of 2 m (6.6 ft). One fish caught in Norway in 2012 reportedly weighed 114 kg (251 lb).

- Pearlfish and allies (Ophidiiformes)

The largest member of this order is the widely distributed giant cusk-eels is the scaleline cusk (Lamprogrammus shcherbachevi), which can reach 193 cm (6.33 ft) long. However, even large fish probably aren't over 10 kg (22 lb) since they are quite slender.

- Pufferfishes and allies (Tetraodontiformes)

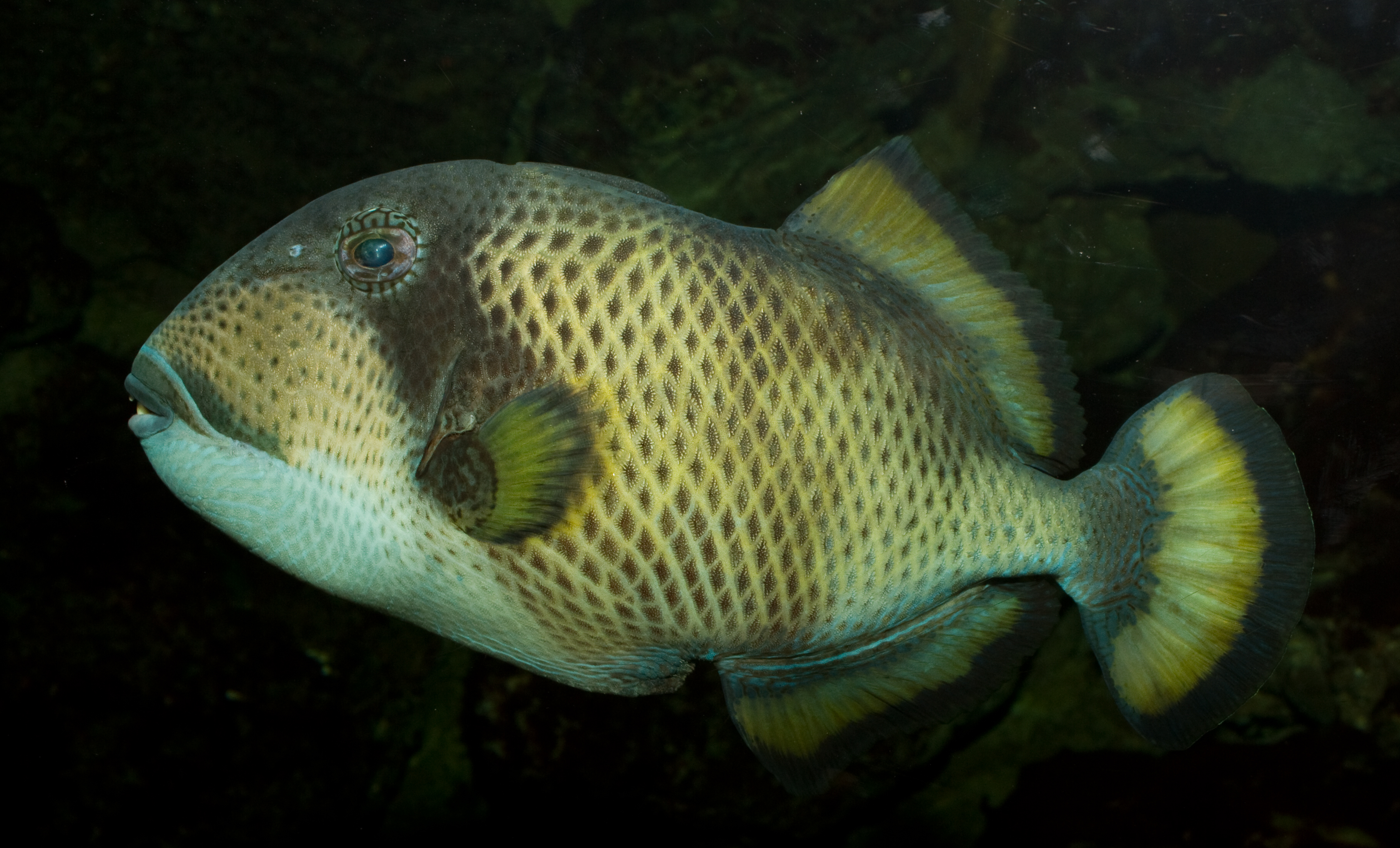
A large titan triggerfish

The starry pufferfish (Arothron stellatus) is the largest pufferfish in the world, growing to a length of 1.2 m (47 in). The largest freshwater pufferfish is the mbu pufferfish (Tetraodon mbu) from the Congo River basin. It attains lengths of 67 cm (26 in). As such, these fish are difficult to adequately house in captivity since they require a very large aquarium and appropriately scaled water filtration.
At lengths up to 1 m (39 in), the stone triggerfish (Pseudobalistes naufragium) from the Eastern Pacific is the largest triggerfish (Balistidae family), edging out the titan triggerfish (Balistoides viridescens) at 75 cm (30 in).
This order also includes the largest bony fish, the sunfish in the Molidae family (see top of article).

- Seahorses and allies (Syngnathiformes)

The largest of this diverse order is the red cornetfish (Fistularia petimba), a long, thin species found in all tropical oceans. This fish can reach a length of 2 m (6.6 ft) and a weight of 4.65 kg (10.3 lb). The largest of the famous, petite seahorses is the big-belly seahorse (Hippocampus abdominalis) found off Australia and New Zealand, which can grow to 35 cm (14 in) high and weigh over 60 g (2.1 oz).

- Gobies and allies (Gobiiformes)

The marbled sleeper (Oxyeleotris marmorata) of East Asia is the largest member of the Gobiiformes, and can reach 0.66 m (2.2 ft) long and weigh 9.9 kg (22 lb).

- Swamp-eels (Synbranchiformes)

The tropic-dwelling swamp-eels, which are not closely related to true eels, reaches their largest size in the marbled swamp eel (Synbrachus marmoratus) of Central and South America. This fish can range up to 1.5 m (4.9 ft) and weigh 7 kg (15 lb).

==== Superorder Paracanthopterygii (Note: Paracanthopterygii is often placed under Acanthopterygii) ====
- Cod (Gadiformes)

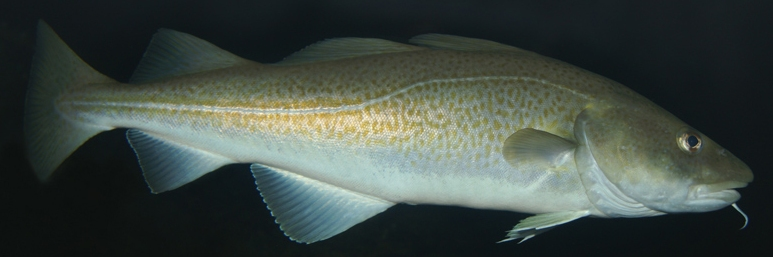
The largest cod, the Atlantic cod

The Atlantic cod (Gadus morhua) grows to a verified size of 1.8 m (5.9 ft) and 51 kg (112 lb), with multiple caught over 48 kg (106 lb). One specimen caught in 1895 was reported at 2 m (6.6 ft) long and 96 kg (212 lb).

- Dories (Zeiformes)

The largest species of dory is the Cape dory (Zeus capensis) reaching a size of 90 cm (35 in) and a weight of 9 kg (20 lb).

- Trout-perch and allies (Percopsiformes)

The largest species in this small order (both by number of species and body size) is the sand roller (Percopsis transmontana) of North America. This species can range up to 20 cm (7.9 in) in length and can weigh over 11 g (0.39 oz).

==== Superorder Ostariophysi ====
- Characins (Characiformes)

The largest species is the African freshwater fish, the giant tigerfish (Hydrocynus goliath). The top size of this fish is 1.5 m (4.9 ft) and 50 kg (110 lb). Among the largest of the Characin family is the popular sport-fish, the golden dorado (Salminus brasiliensis), which can reach up to 1 m (3.3 ft) in length and weigh 31.4 kg (69 lb), with one reported at 34 kg (75 lb). The largest in the Erythrinidae family is the aimara or giant wolffish (Hoplias aimara) (unrelated to Anarhichadidae) growing to 40 kg (88 lb) and 1.2 m (3.9 ft).Among the characins are the infamous neotropical piranhas. Carnivorous species can grow up to 0.43 m (1.4 ft), although the tambaqui or pacu (Colossoma macropomum), at up to 1 m (3.3 ft) and 32.4 kg (71 lb), but likely 40 kg (88 lb), is often considered a giant, herbivorous form of piranha.

- Catfish (Siluriformes)

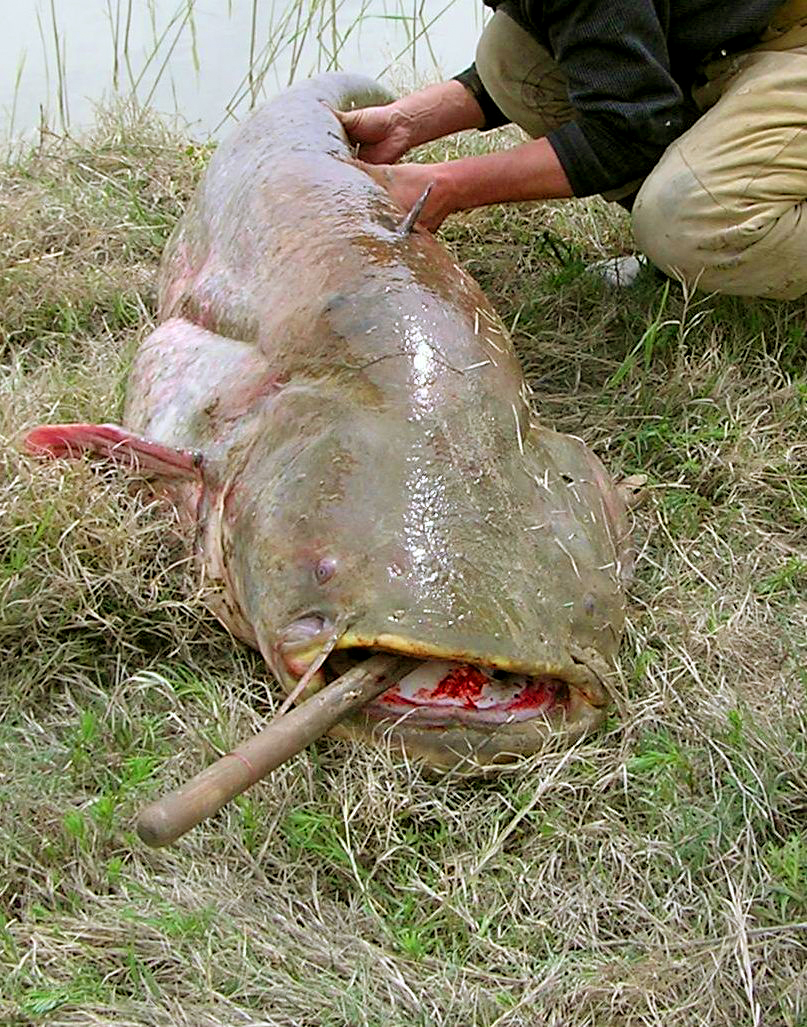
A good-sized wels catfish, such as this specimen of over 90 kg (200 lb), is a rival for the title of the largest catfish.

Most authorities now give the crown of the largest catfish to the Mekong giant catfish, Pangasianodon gigas, which is also considered the heaviest completely freshwater fish. This fish has been recorded at sizes up to 350 kg (770 lb) and 3 m (9.8 ft), although the largest verified was 293 kg (646 lb). The closely-related Asian giant pangasius (Pangasius sanitwongsei) can grow to 3 m (9.8 ft) and 300 kg (660 lb). Another large species is the wels catfish (Silurus glanis) of Europe and Central Asia, which strongly rivals the proceeding species in weight and could possibly surpass them in length. While wels have been confirmed to 3.1 m (10 ft), other whiskered giants have been reliably reported to grow to 3.7 m (12 ft) and 265 kg (584 lb) and less reliably to 4.3 m (14 ft). In South America there also exists the piraíba (Brachyplatystoma filamentosum), which can reportedly reach up to 3.6 m (12 ft) and 200 kg (440 lb).

- Minnows and allies (Cypriniformes)

The minnow family (which includes carp), Cyprinidae, is the largest family of vertebrates, with over 2400 species known today. The largest species is the giant barb (Catlocarpio siamensis), which is endemic to three river basins in Southeast Asia and reaches a size of as much as 3 m (9.8 ft) and a weight of as much as 300 kg (660 lb). In centuries past, mahseer, specifically the golden mahseer (Tor putitora) of Southern Asia was reported to reach similar lengths, but the species has been overfished and specimens nearly as large as the giant barb have not been reported in recent centuries.

- Shellears and allies (Gonorynchiformes)

The well-known milkfish (Chanos chanos) is the largest member of this order. The maximum size is 22.7 kg (50 lb) and 1.84 m (6.0 ft) long.

- Knifefish (Gymnotiformes)

The largest knifefish is recently classified Volta's electric eel (Electrophorus voltai), a species of electric eel in the genus Electrophorus, which previously only had the electric eel (Electrophorus electricus), but now contains three species. The electric eels have an elongated, cylindrical body, with their anus near the front of the body.
E. voltai can reach up to 2.5 m (8 ft 2 in) and 22 kg (49 lb), making them the largest species of the Gymnotiformes. They can impressively emit up to 860 volts out of their body.
E. electrius typically grows to about 2 m (6 ft 7 in) in length, and 20 kg (44 lb) in weight.

==== Superorder Clupeomorpha ====
- Herring (Clupeiformes)

The largest herring is probably the dorab wolf herring (Chirocentrus dorab) of the Indo-Pacific oceans. The maximum size of this species has been reported as much as 1.8 m (5.9 ft), but these slender fish have never been recorded as exceeding 3.4 kg (7.5 lb) in weight. The so-called "king of herrings" is not a herring, but an oarfish.

==== Superorder Osteoglossomorpha ====
- Mooneyes (Hiodontiformes)

Only two extant species are known to exist in this relatively new order. The larger of the two is the goldeye (Hiodon alosoides) from the northern rivers of North America, which can reach up to 0.5 m (1.6 ft) in length and can weigh 1.8 kg (4.0 lb).

- Bony-tongued fish (Osteoglossiformes)

The largest species is the South American fish usually known as the arapaima (Arapaima gigas). The maximum size this species can attain is a matter of some controversy and some rank it among the world's largest freshwater fishes. In 2015, the largest verified specimen was caught on fly tackle, weighing 188 kg (414 lb) at a length of 4.05 m (13.3 ft). The skeleton of a fish reported to have been measured by native hunters as 4.5 m (15 ft) and weighing 200 kg (440 lb) when caught, was later examined as a skeleton scientifically and was found to have been roughly within that outsized dimension. One fish caught in Thailand, where the species has been introduced, apparently weighed 230 kg (510 lb).

==== Superorder Lamprimorpha ====
- Ribbonfish and allies (Lampriformes)

The largest member of this small but fascinating order is the aforementioned king of herrings or giant oarfish (Regalecus glesne), the longest extant bony fish on earth, ranging from 7–8 metres (23–26 ft) total length, likely up to 11 metres (36 ft), and can be as heavy as 272 kg (600 lb). Another interesting big fish in this order is the North Atlantic opah (Lampris guttatus), which as opposed to the king of herrings, is massive and has a chunky, rounded shape. The opahs of the genus Lampris are also the only known endothermic or warm-blooded fish. Opahs can range up to 2 m (6.6 ft) in length and weigh up to 270 kg (600 lb).

==== Superorder Scopelomorpha ====
- Lanternfish (Myctophiformes)

The largest of the numerous but small lanternfish is Bolin's lanternfish (Gymnoscopelus bolini) of the Indo-Pacific oceans, at up to 249 g (8.8 oz) and 35 cm (14 in).

==== Subclass Cladistia ====
- Polypterids and allies (Polypteriformes)

The largest polypterid is the Congo bichir (Polypterus congicus), which reaches up to 97 cm (38 in) in length.

=== Lobe-finned fish (Sarcopterygii) ===
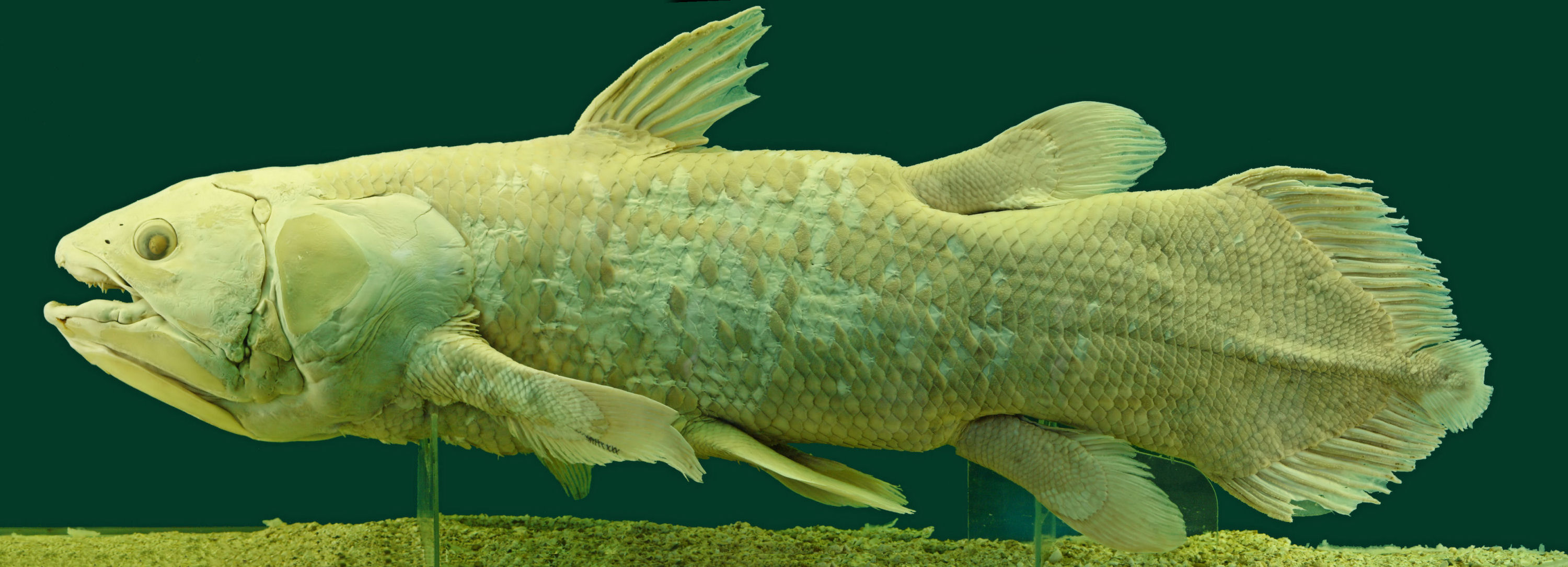
The coelacanth is the largest extant lobe-finned fish.

The largest living (non-tetrapod) lobe-finned fish is the coelacanth. The average weight of the living West Indian Ocean coelacanth, (Latimeria chalumnae), is 80 kg (180 lb), and they can reach up to 2 m (6.6 ft) in length. Specimens can weigh up to 110 kg (240 lb). The largest lobe-finned fish of all time was Rhizodus at up to 7 m (23 ft).

- Lungfish (Dipnoi)

The largest lungfish, the African lungfish (Protopterus aethiopicus), is smooth, elongated, and cylindrical with deeply embedded scales. The tail is very long and tapers at the end. They can reach a length of up to 2 m (6.6 ft) and may weigh as much as 50 kg (110 lb). The pectoral and pelvic fins are also very long and thin, almost spaghetti-like.

== See also ==
- Megafauna
- List of longest fish
- Largest animals
- Largest prehistoric animals
