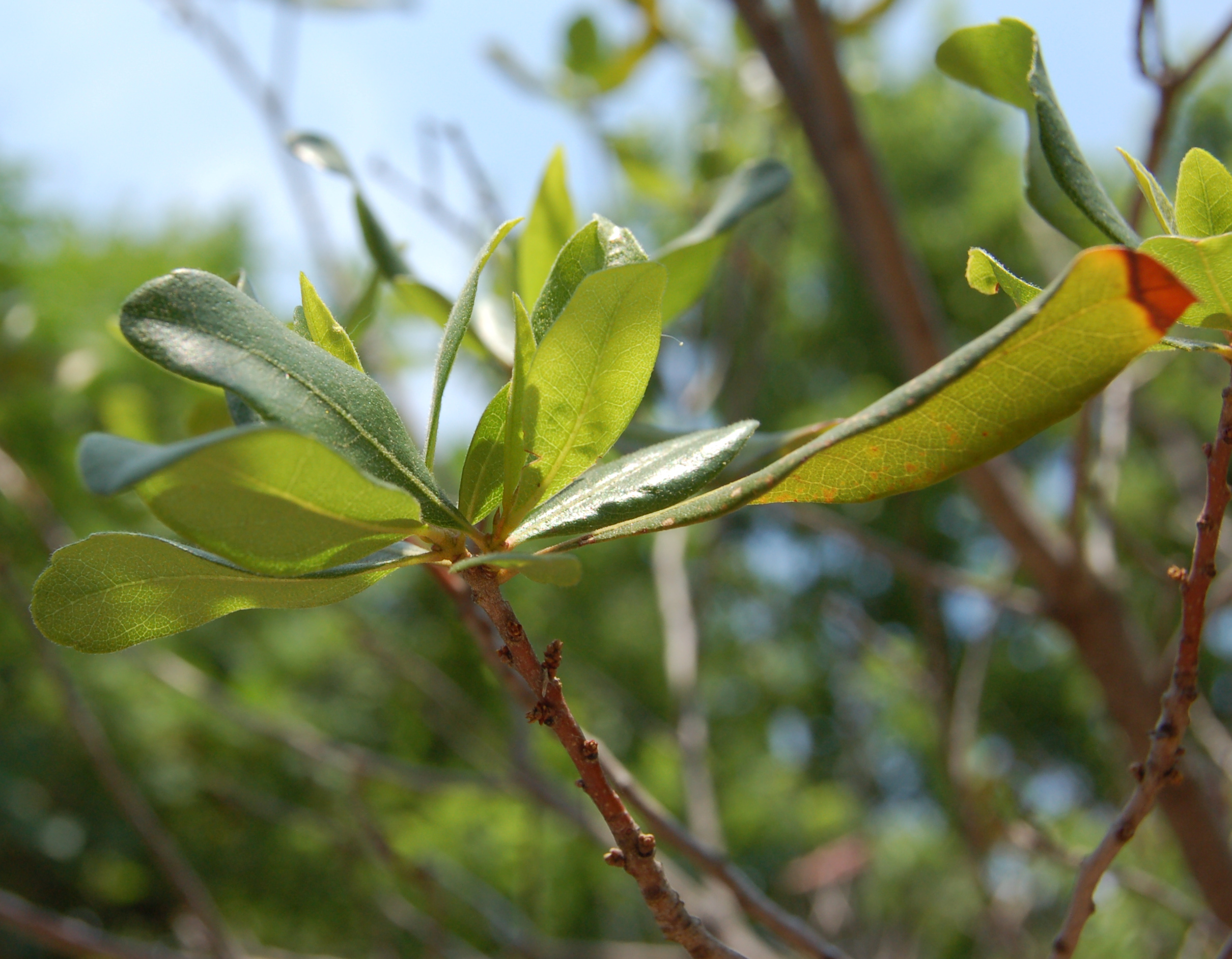

Scientific classification
- Kingdom: Plantae
- Clade: Tracheophytes
- Clade: Angiosperms
- Clade: Eudicots
- Clade: Rosids
- Order: Fagales
- Family: Myricaceae
- Genus: Myrica
- Species: M. pensylvanica

Binomial name
- Myrica pensylvanica Mirbel
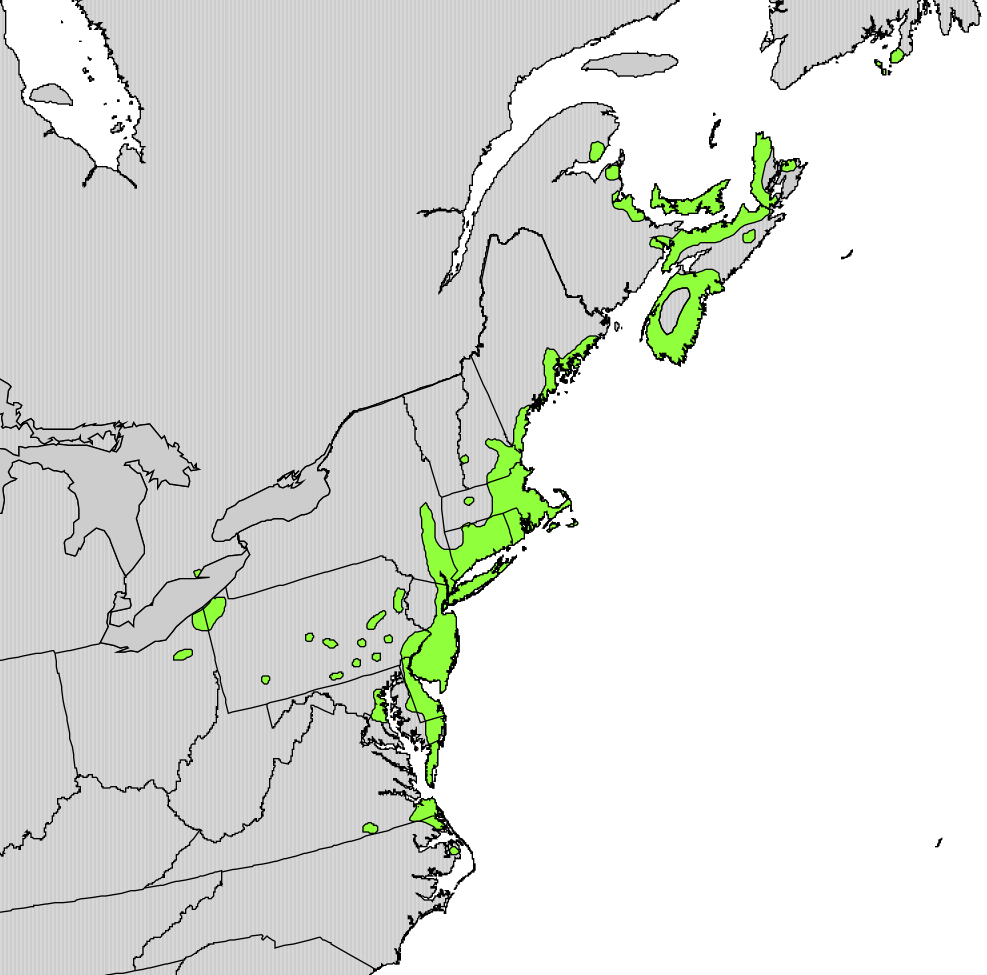
- Natural range

Synonyms
- Morella pensylvanica

= Myrica pensylvanica =

Species of flowering plant

Myrica pensylvanica, the northern bayberry, is a species of Myrica native to eastern North America, from Newfoundland west to Ontario and Ohio (locally endangered), and south to North Carolina. It is also classified as Morella pensylvanica.

Myrica pensylvanica is a deciduous shrub growing to 4.5 m tall. The leaves are 2.5–7 cm long and 1.5-2.7 cm broad, broadest near the leaf apex, serrate, and sticky with a spicy scent when crushed. The flowers are borne in catkins 3–18 mm long, in range of colors from green to red. The fruit is a wrinkled berry 3–5.5 mm diameter, with a pale blue-purple waxy coating; they are an important food for yellow-rumped warblers.

This species has root nodules containing nitrogen-fixing microorganisms, allowing it to grow in relatively poor soils.

== Taxonomy ==
This plant is one of several Myrica species that are sometimes split into the genus Morella, e.g. in the Integrated Taxonomic Information System. Additionally southern bayberry, M. caroliniensis, and this species are sometimes lumped, disregarding the putative difference that M. caroliniensis is evergreen or tardily deciduous. M. pensylvanica is similar to wax myrtle, M. cerifera. These plants' leaves and scent distinguish them: wax myrtle leaves have scent glands on both sides and are fragrant when crushed, northern bayberry has scent glands mainly on the leaf undersides and is not markedly fragrant. Northern bayberry hybridizes with both southern bayberry and wax myrtle.

== Uses ==
The berries can be used to make bayberry wax candles. American colonists boiled the berries to extract the sweet-smelling wax, which they used to make clean-burning candles.

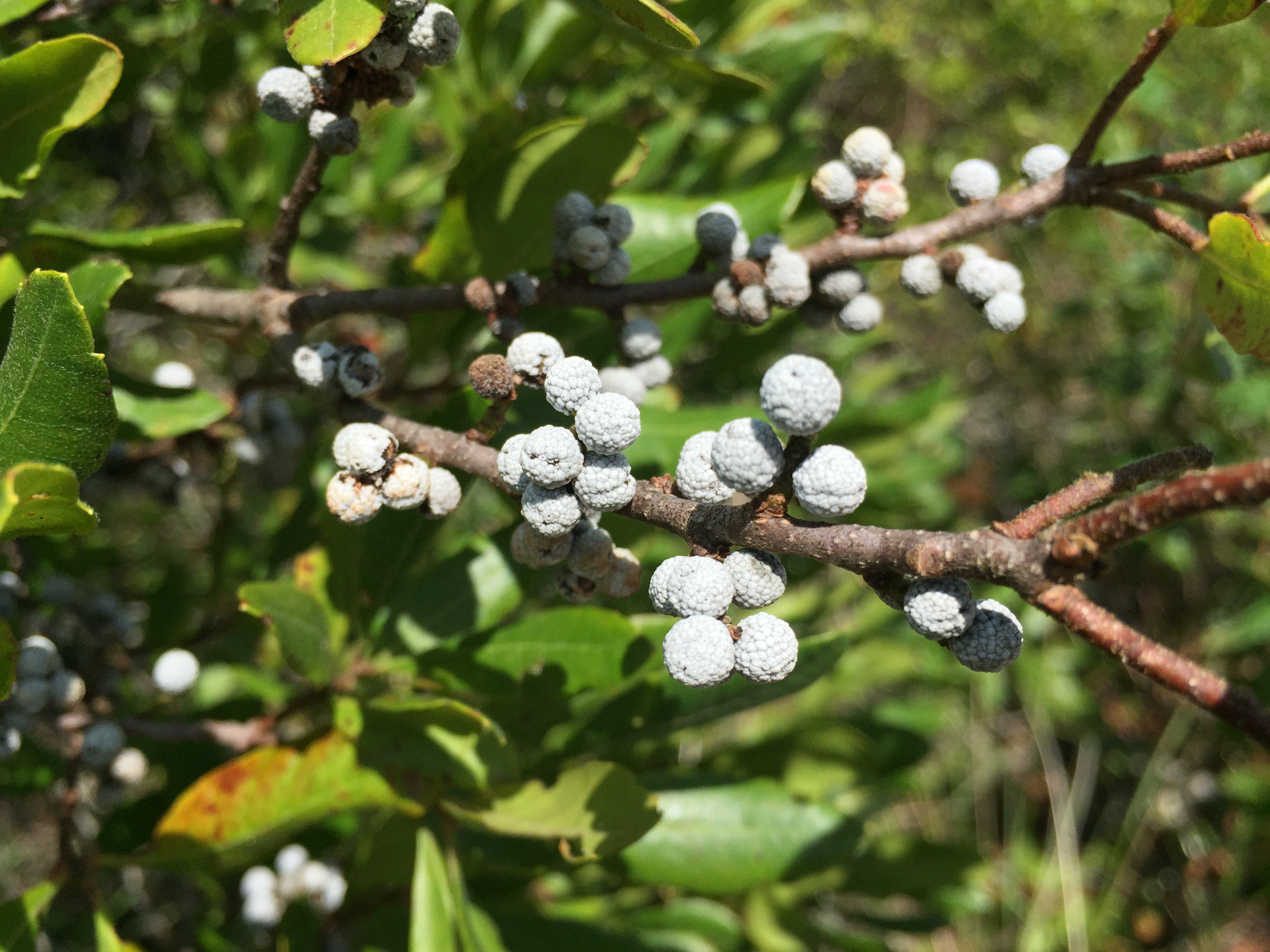
Northern bayberry fruit
