= Dichomeris bipunctellus =

Scientific classification
- Domain: Eukaryota
- Kingdom: Animalia
- Phylum: Arthropoda
- Class: Insecta
- Order: Lepidoptera
- Family: Gelechiidae
- Genus: Dichomeris
- Species: D. bipunctellus

Binomial name
- Dichomeris bipunctellus (Walsingham, 1882)

Synonyms
- Ypsolophus bipunctellus Walsingham, 1882

Species of moth

Dichomeris bipunctellus is a moth in the family Gelechiidae. It was described by Thomas de Grey in 1882. It is found in North America, where it has been recorded from Quebec to Maine, south to Florida and Louisiana.

The wingspan is about 17 mm (0.67 in). The forewings are pale brownish ochreous, dusted with widely scattered black scales and with a rather elongate black discal dot before the middle with a few whitish scales along its anterior and lower edges, followed by a smaller black dot at the end of the cell, also surrounded by whitish scales on its anterior and lower edge. There is a row of eight marginal black dots around the apex and apical margin. The hindwings are pale greyish ochreous. Adults are on wing from February to October.

The larvae feed on Myrica aspleniifolia, Myrica gale and Myrica pensylvanica.
