= M. arborea =

M. arborea may refer to:

- Medicago arborea, the moon trefoil, shrub medick, alfalfa arborea or tree medick, a plant species found throughout Europe and especially in the Mediterranean basin
- Myrica arborea, a plant species endemic to Equatorial Guinea

== See also ==
- Arborea (disambiguation)
