= B. arborea =

B. arborea may refer to:

- Banksia arborea, the Yilgarn dryandra, a plant species endemic to Western Australia
- Brugmansia arborea, the angel's trumpet, a flowering plant species found in Bolivia, Colombia and Peru
- Bulnesia arborea, a flowering plant species is native to Colombia and Venezuela

== See also ==
- Arborea (disambiguation)
