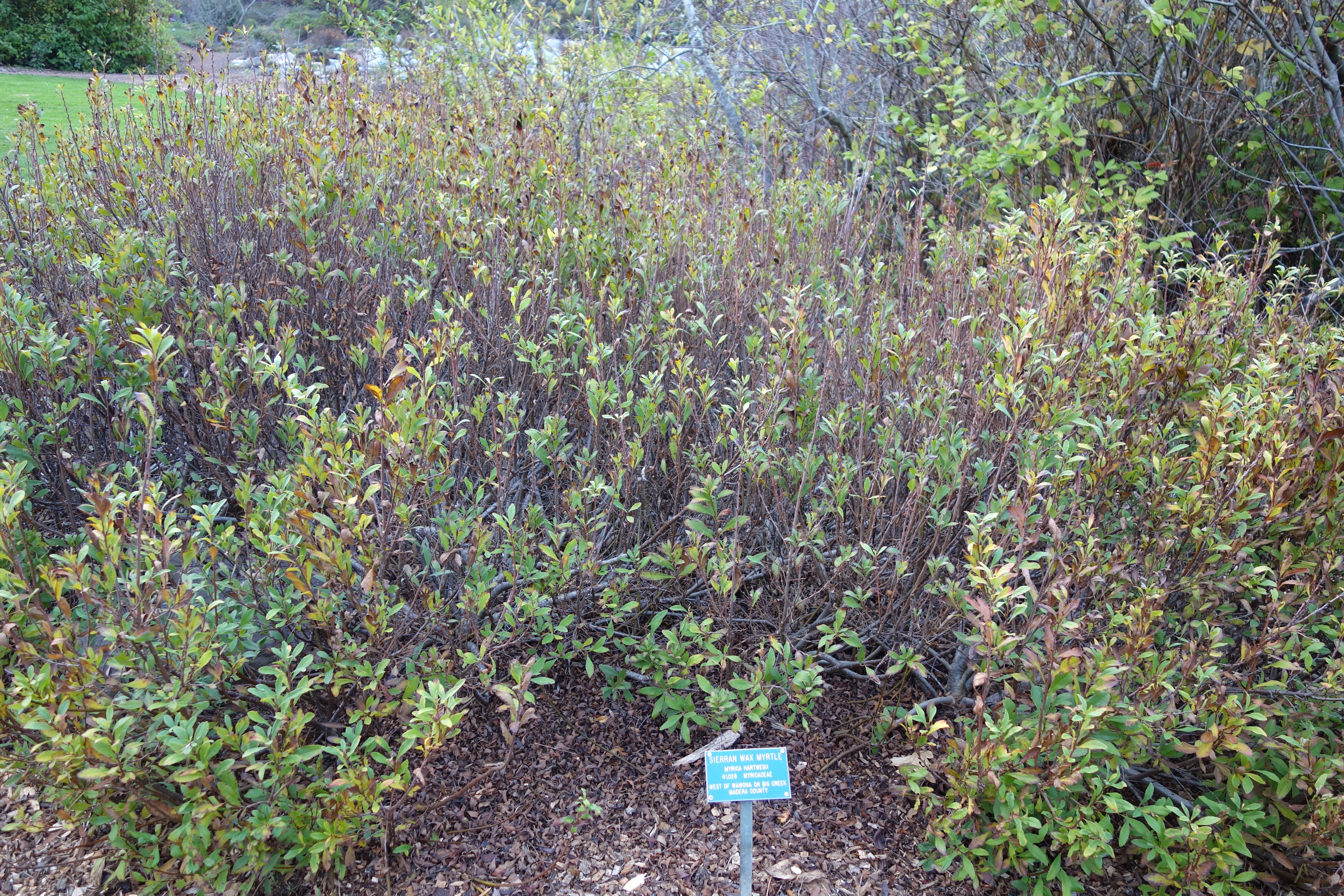

Scientific classification
- Kingdom: Plantae
- Clade: Tracheophytes
- Clade: Angiosperms
- Clade: Eudicots
- Clade: Rosids
- Order: Fagales
- Family: Myricaceae
- Genus: Myrica
- Species: M. hartwegii

Binomial name
- Myrica hartwegii S.Watson

= Myrica hartwegii =

Species of shrub

Myrica hartwegii, known by the common names Sierra sweet bay and Sierra bayberry, is a species of shrub in the bayberry family.

The plant is endemic to the Sierra Nevada of California, where it grows in moist areas, such as streambanks, in the foothills and lower slopes up to a maximum elevation of 1,500–1,800 metres (4,900–5,900 ft) .

== Description ==
Myrica hartwegii is deciduous shrub that grows 1–2 metres (3.3–6.6 ft) tall with purple-black branches and twigs studded with yellowish resin glands.

The leaves are widely lance-shaped to oval with blunt tips. They are up to about 10 cm long and about 3 wide, and they are usually edged with a few shallow teeth. They have scattered hairs and are densely coated in resin glands.

The male and female flowers are arranged in separate spikelike inflorescences. The spherical, slightly waxy fruit is just under 2 mm wide and is dotted with glands.
