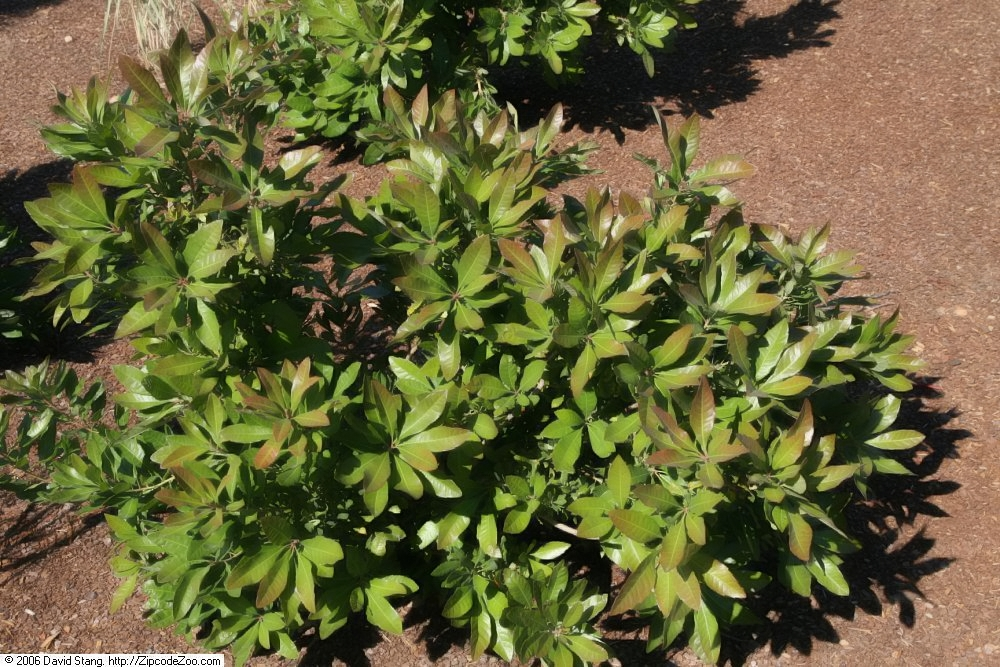
- Morella carolinensis 'Robbie Green'

Scientific classification
- Kingdom: Plantae
- Clade: Tracheophytes
- Clade: Angiosperms
- Clade: Eudicots
- Clade: Rosids
- Order: Fagales
- Family: Myricaceae
- Genus: Myrica
- Species: M. caroliniensis

Binomial name
- Myrica caroliniensis P. Mill. 1768

Synonyms
- Cerothamnus pensylvanicus (Loisel.) Moldenke; Myrica pennsylvanica Lam.

= Myrica caroliniensis =

Species of shrub

Myrica caroliniensis is a shrub or small tree native to the coast and coastal plains of southeastern North America. Its common names include bayberry, southern bayberry, pocosin bayberry, and evergreen bayberry. It sees uses in the garden and for candlemaking, as well as a medicinal plant.

== Taxonomy ==
This plant is one of several Myrica species that are sometimes split into the genus Morella, e.g. in the Integrated Taxonomic Information System. Additionally M. pensylvanica, which occurs more northerly, and this species are sometimes lumped, disregarding the putative difference that M. pensylvanica is deciduous. M. caroliniensis has several synonyms aside from the Myrica/Morella and M. pensylvanica splits: Myrica heterophylla, Cerothamnus caroliniensis, and Myrica heterophylla var. curtissii. M. caroliniensis is similar to wax myrtle, M. cerifera. These plants' leaves and scent distinguish them: wax myrtle leaves have scent glands on both sides and are fragrant when crushed, bayberry has scent glands mainly on the leaf undersides and is not markedly fragrant. Bayberry and wax myrtle hybridize.

== Description ==
Myrica caroliniensis is a shrub or small tree adapted to a range of environments from dunes to pocosins, mostly associated with wetlands.

In nature, it ranges from Texas to Maryland on the U.S. east coast. It is difficult to distinguish from M. pensylvanica which occurs north to Canada.

Myrica caroliniensis is evergreen or tardily deciduous, forming rhizomatous colonies. The glandular leaves are long with a leathery texture and serrated edges. The plant is dioecious, with male and female flowers borne on separate plants. Male flowers have three to five stamens surrounded by short bracts. Female flowers develop into globular drupes surrounded by a waxy coating. The species flowers from spring to early summer, and bears fruit in late summer or fall.

Bayberry is an actinorhizal plant: its roots feature nitrogen fixing nodules formed in symbiosis with the nitrogen fixing actinobacterium Frankia. Thus it is tolerant of nitrogen-poor, acidic soils such as wetlands and dunes.

The fruit is a source of food for many bird species, including the northern bobwhite quail and the wild turkey. In winter, the seeds are important foods for the Carolina wren and species of tree sparrow. To a point, M. caroliniensis will also provide habitat for the northern bobwhite quail. Birds' digestive systems remove the wax from the fruit, a prerequisite for germination.

== Uses ==
=== Ornamental ===
Myrica caroliniensis finds use in gardening and horticulture.

=== Herbalism ===
Pioneers used the bark of bayberry in dentifrice.

Choctaw boiled bayberry and used the result as a treatment for fevers. In 1722, it was reported that colonists in Louisiana drank a mixture of wax and hot water to treat severe dysentery. Bayberry was reported in an account from 1737 as being used to treat convulsions, colic, palsy, and seizures. Starting in the early 19th century, the herbalist Samuel Thomson recommended this plant for producing "heat" within the body and as a treatment for infectious diseases and diarrhea. That use of bayberry waned later in the 19th century, in favor of using it for a variety of ailments, including a topical use for bleeding gums. For twenty years starting in 1916, bayberry root bark was listed in the American National Formulary.

In general, either a decoction or a tincture is used. Infusions and a topical paste have also been used.

Pregnant women should not use bayberry.

=== Candles ===
Southern bayberry's fruits are a traditional source of the wax for those old-fashioned Christmas decorations called bayberry candles. The wax was extracted by boiling the berries, and skimming off the floating hydrocarbons. The fats were then boiled again and then strained. After that the liquid was usable in candle making, whether through dipping or molding. Southern bayberry is not the only plant usable for making bayberry candles, however. Its close relatives are also usable.

Southern bayberry and its relatives have largely been supplanted in candlemaking by substitutes made from paraffin. The substitute candles have artificial colors and aroma compounds that create candles that look and smell similar to natural ones.
