= L. arborea =

L. arborea may refer to:

- Lavatera arborea, the tree mallow, a flowering plant species native to the coasts of western Europe and the Mediterranean region, from the British Isles south to Algeria and Libya and east to Greece
- Lullula arborea, the woodlark, a bird species that breeds across most of Europe, the Middle East Asia and the mountains of north Africa

== See also ==
- Arborea (disambiguation)
