= Myrica rivas-martinezii =

Conservation status
- Critically Endangered (IUCN 3.1)

Scientific classification
- Kingdom: Plantae
- Clade: Tracheophytes
- Clade: Angiosperms
- Clade: Eudicots
- Clade: Rosids
- Order: Fagales
- Family: Myricaceae
- Genus: Myrica
- Species: M. rivas-martinezii

Binomial name
- Myrica rivas-martinezii A. Santos

Species of flowering plant

Myrica rivas-martinezii is a species of plant in the Myricaceae family. It is endemic to three of the Canary Islands (Spain). It is threatened by habitat loss and fewer than 100 plants are known.
