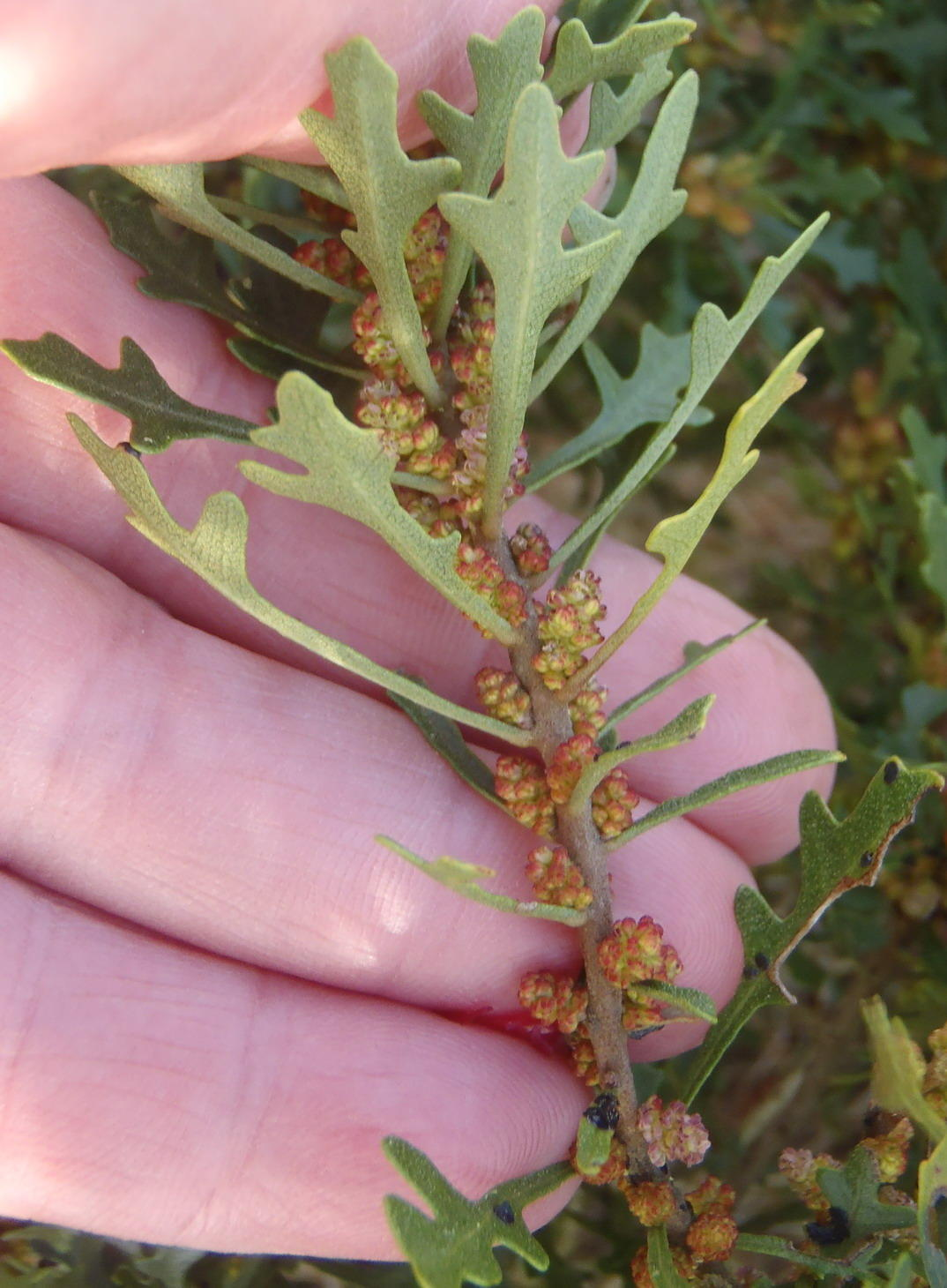

Conservation status
- Least Concern (SANBI Red List)

Scientific classification
- Kingdom: Plantae
- Clade: Tracheophytes
- Clade: Angiosperms
- Clade: Eudicots
- Clade: Rosids
- Order: Fagales
- Family: Myricaceae
- Genus: Myrica
- Species: M. quercifolia

Binomial name
- Myrica quercifolia L. (1753)

Synonyms
- Morella quercifolia (L.) Killick; Myrica hirsuta Mill.; Myrica ilicifolia Burm.f.; Myrica incisa A.Chev.; Myrica laciniata Willd.; Myrica zeyheri C.DC.

= Myrica quercifolia =

Shrub endemic to South Africa

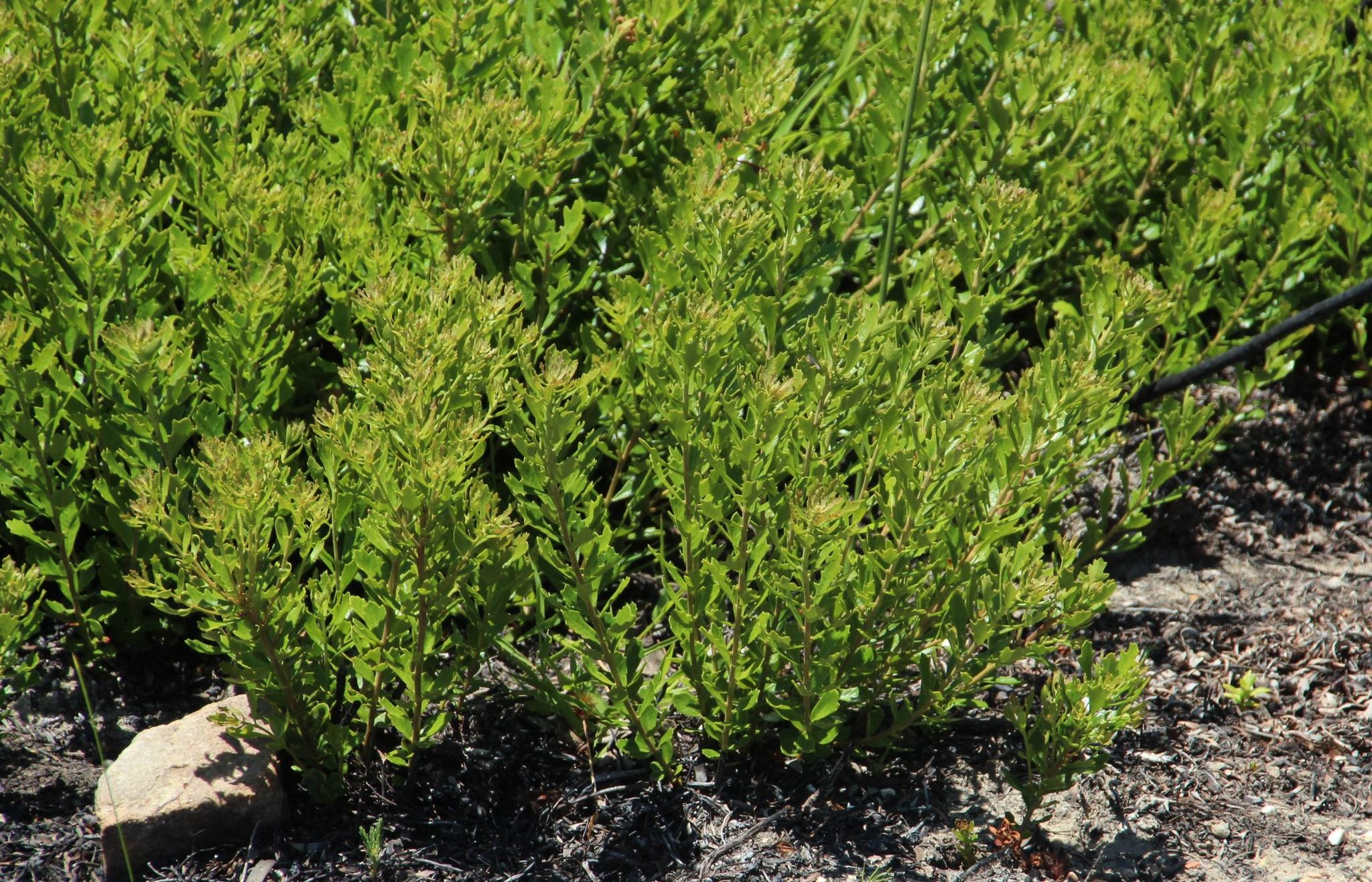

Myrica quercifolia is a species of shrub in the genus Myrica. It is endemic to the Cape Provinces and the North West of South Africa. It is also known by the names oak waxberry and maagpynbossie (Afrikaans for stomach pain bush).

== Conservation status ==
Myrica quercifolia is classified as Least Concern.
