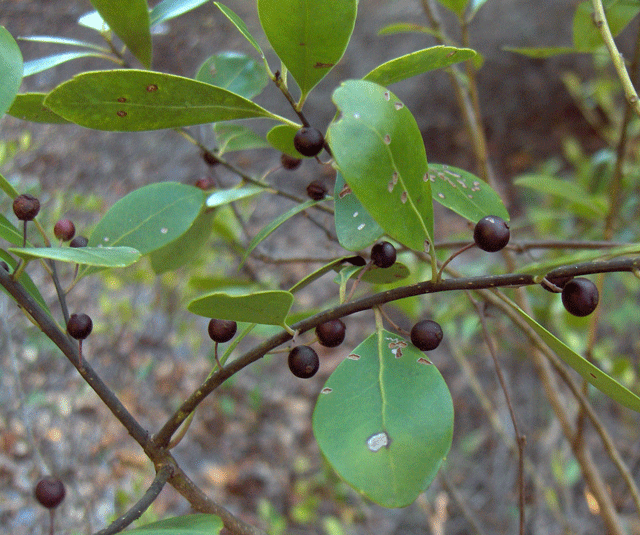

Conservation status
- Apparently Secure (NatureServe)

Scientific classification
- Kingdom: Plantae
- Clade: Tracheophytes
- Clade: Angiosperms
- Clade: Eudicots
- Clade: Rosids
- Order: Fagales
- Family: Myricaceae
- Genus: Myrica
- Species: M. inodora

Binomial name
- Myrica inodora W. Bartram

Synonyms
- Cerothamnus inodorus (W. Bartram) Small; Morella inodora (W. Bartram) Small; Myrica laureola C. DC.; Myrica obovata C. DC.

= Myrica inodora =

Species of flowering plant

Myrica inodora is a plant species native to the coastal plains on the northern shore of the Gulf of Mexico, in the Florida Panhandle, the extreme southern parts of Alabama and Mississippi, eastern Louisiana and southwestern Georgia. Common names include scentless bayberry, odorless bayberry, odorless wax-myrtle, waxberry, candleberry, and waxtree. It grows in swamps, bogs, pond edges and stream banks.

Myrica inodora is an evergreen, monoecious shrub or small tree up to 7 m (23 feet) tall. Leaves are ovate to elliptic, up to 12 cm (5 inches) long, lacking the odor characteristic of other members of the genus. Fruits are spherical or nearly so, up to 8 mm (0.3 inches) in diameter, covered with whitish wax and glandular hairs.
