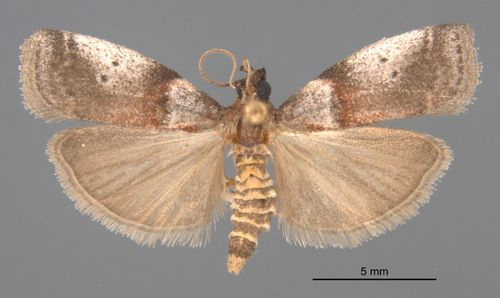

Scientific classification
- Kingdom: Animalia
- Phylum: Arthropoda
- Clade: Pancrustacea
- Class: Insecta
- Order: Lepidoptera
- Family: Pyralidae
- Genus: Acrobasis
- Species: A. cirroferella

Binomial name
- Acrobasis cirroferella Hulst, 1892

Synonyms
- Acrobasis myricella Barnes & McDunnough, 1917; Acrobasis comptoniella Grossbeck, 1917

= Acrobasis cirroferella =

Species of moth

Acrobasis cirroferella is a species of snout moth in the genus Acrobasis. It was described by George Duryea Hulst in 1892, and is known from the US states of Florida and Texas.

The larvae feed on Myrica cerifera.
