= A. arborea =

A. arborea may refer to:

- Amelanchier arborea, the downy serviceberry or common serviceberry, a plant species native to eastern North America from the Gulf Coast north to Thunder Bay in Ontario and Lake St. John in Quebec and west to Texas and Minnesota
- Ampelopsis arborea, the pepper vine, a plant species native to the Southeastern United States, Texas and New Mexico

== See also ==
- Arborea (disambiguation)
