= E. arborea =

E. arboreae may refer to:

- Eisenia arborea, the southern sea palm, a kelp species found from Vancouver Island, Canada to Isla Magdalena, Mexico
- Erica arborea, the tree heath, a flowering plant species native to the maquis shrublands surrounding the Mediterranean Basin

== See also ==
- Arborea (disambiguation)
