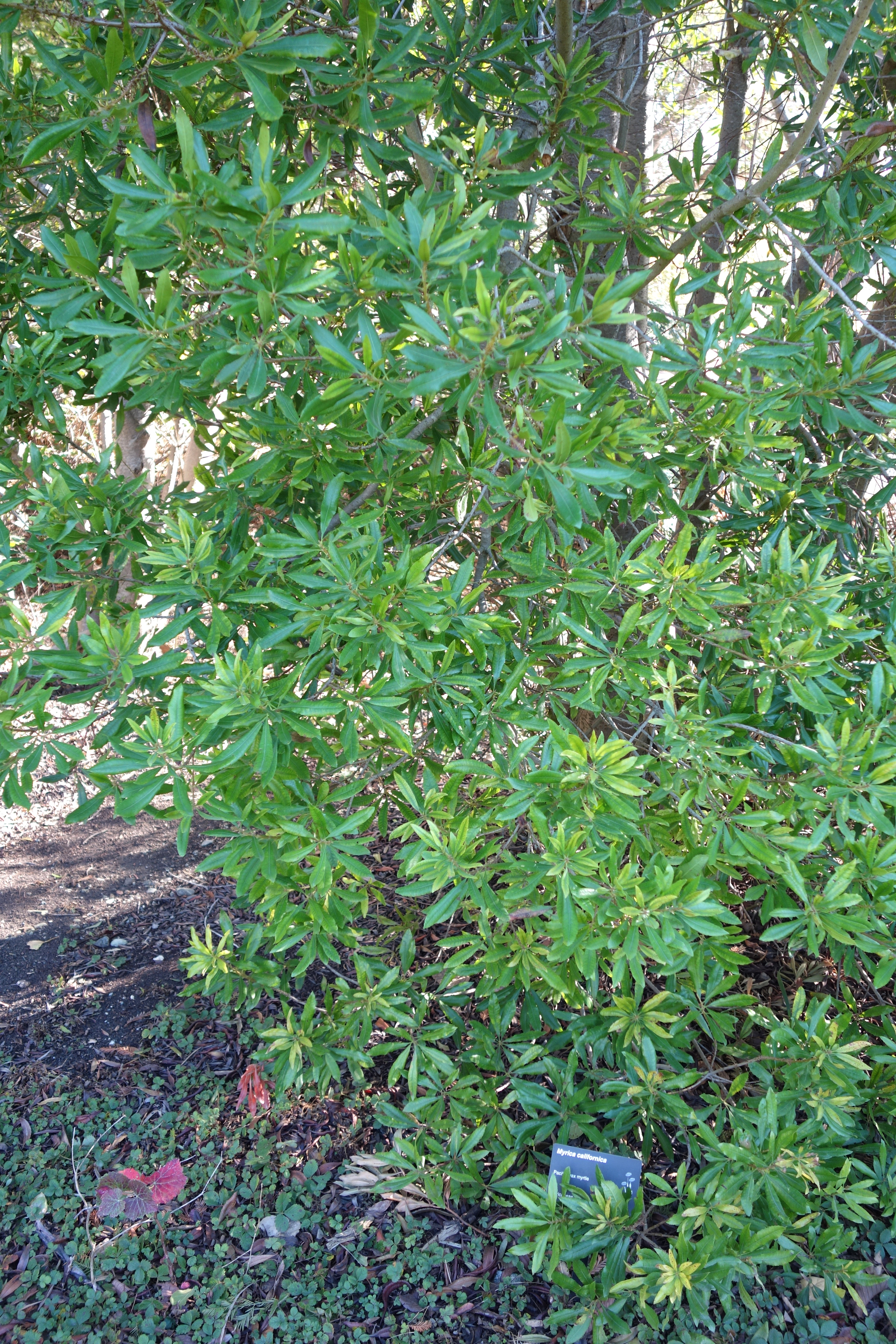
- Myrica californica growing at Leaning Pine Arboretum

Scientific classification
- Kingdom: Plantae
- Clade: Tracheophytes
- Clade: Angiosperms
- Clade: Eudicots
- Clade: Rosids
- Order: Fagales
- Family: Myricaceae
- Genus: Myrica
- Species: M. californica

Binomial name
- Myrica californica Cham. & Schltdl.
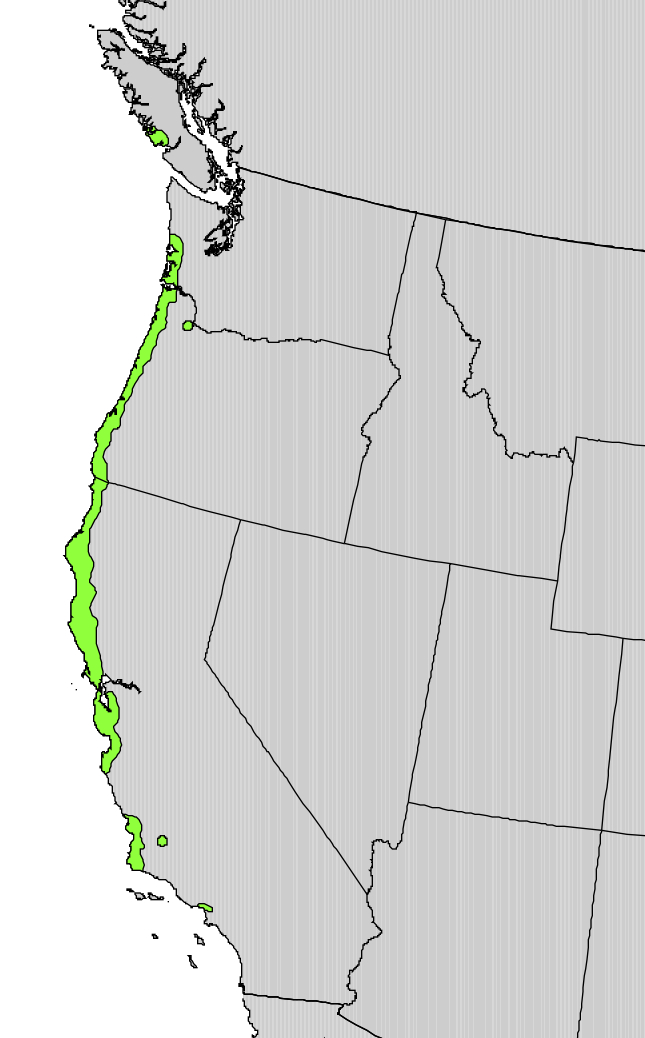
- Range of Myrica californica

Synonyms
- Morella californica

= Myrica californica =

Species of shrub

Myrica californica (California bayberry, California wax myrtle or Pacific wax myrtle) is an evergreen shrub or small tree native to the Pacific coast of North America.

== Description ==
It grows to 2–10 metres (6 1/2–33 ft) tall, and has serrated, sticky green leaves 4–13 centimetres (1 1/2–5 in) long and 0.7–3 cm (1/4–1 1/4 in) broad, which emit a spicy scent on warm days. The inflorescence is arranged in a spike 0.6–3 cm long, in range of colors from green to red. The fruit is a wrinkled purple berry 4–6.5 millimetres (1/8–1/4 in) in diameter, with a waxy coating, hence the common name wax myrtle. This species has root nodules containing nitrogen-fixing microorganisms, allowing it to grow in relatively poor soils.

== Taxonomy ==
Myrica californica is synonymous with Gale californica (Cham. & Schltdl.) Greene, Morella californica (Cham. & Schltdl.) Wilbur).

== Distribution and habitat ==
The species is native to the Pacific coast of North America, from Vancouver Island south to California as far south as the Long Beach area.

== Ecology ==
Various birds eat the berries in small quantities.

== Cultivation and uses ==
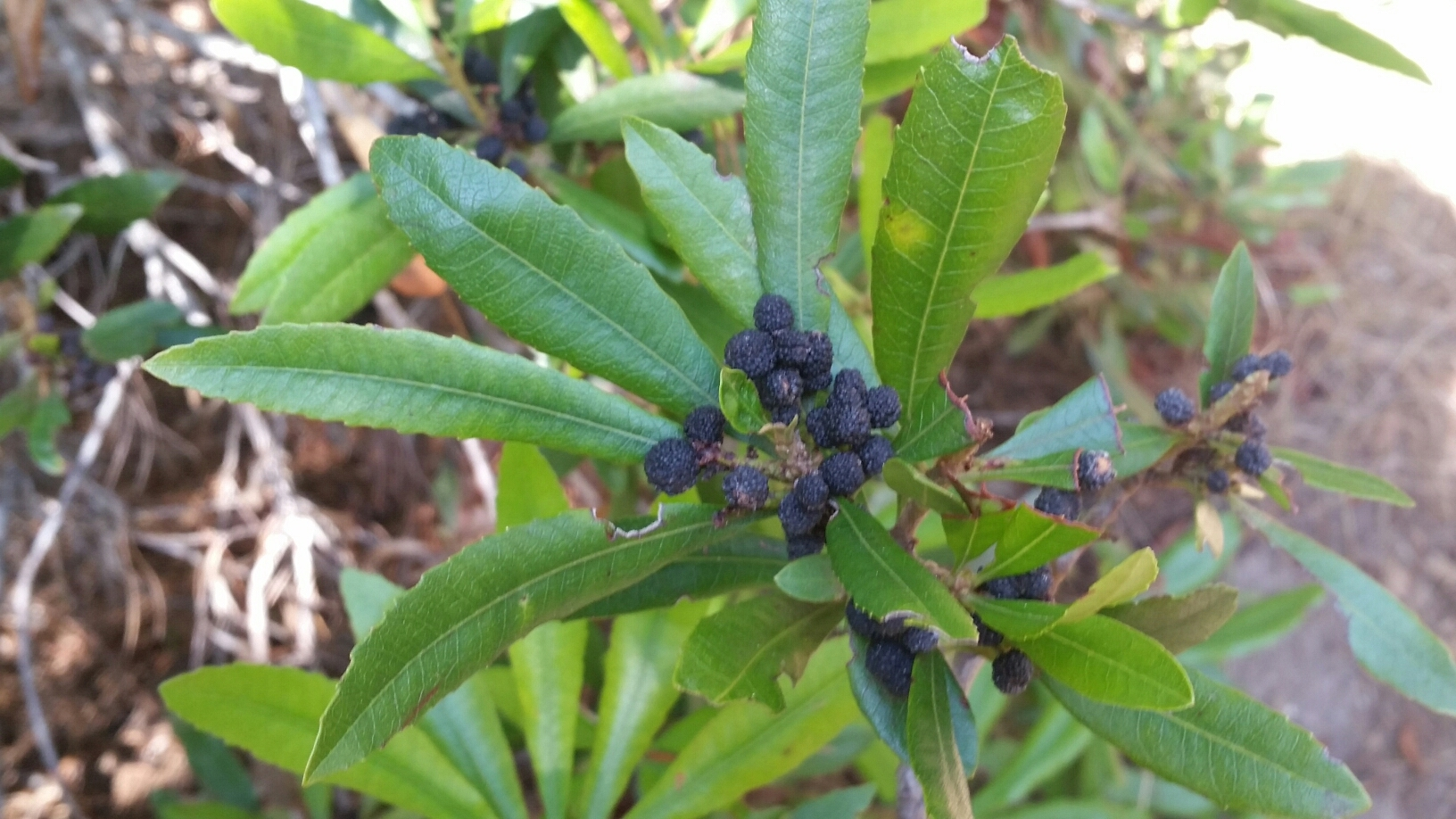
Berries

It grows well on cool, moist coastlines and can be planted in lines as a seaside windbreak. The bark and leaves have historically been used on occasion for gastrointestinal ailments. The most active chemical is apparently the glycoside myricinic acid, which is related to saponin. The plant tissues are also high in tannins. The wax may be extracted from the fruit and made into candles and soap; however, this species produces much less wax than other bayberries, and so is rarely used for this purpose.
