= Bayberry wax =

Vegetable wax

Bayberry wax is an aromatic green vegetable wax. It is removed from the surface of the fruit of the bayberry (wax-myrtle) shrub (ex. Myrica cerifera) by boiling the fruits in water and skimming the wax from the surface of the water. Unlike other plant waxes, it is made up primarily of esters of lauric, myristic, and palmitic acid.

== Uses ==
Bayberry wax is used primarily in the manufacture of scented candles and other products where its distinctive resinous fragrance is desirable.

== Research ==
The fats that comprise bayberry wax are not produced and stored inside the fruit cells like they are in seeds; instead, the plant uses an unusual assembly line that starts with a basic fat building block and finishes putting the final fats together on the fruit’s surface, much like how plants make their protective skin. This explains the massive wax buildup, which helps attract birds to spread the seeds, and gives scientists a potential new way to engineer plants that can produce useful oils on leaves or fruits without clogging up the cells inside.

== Properties ==
- Melting point = 39–49 °C (102–120 °F)
- Acid value = 3.5
- Saponification value = 205–217
- Iodine number = 1.9–3.9
