= Myrica arborea =

Conservation status
- Vulnerable (IUCN 3.1)

Scientific classification
- Kingdom: Plantae
- Clade: Tracheophytes
- Clade: Angiosperms
- Clade: Eudicots
- Clade: Rosids
- Order: Fagales
- Family: Myricaceae
- Genus: Myrica
- Species: M. arborea

Binomial name
- Myrica arborea Hutch.

Synonyms
- Morella arborea (Hutch.) Cheek

Species of flowering plant

Myrica arborea (sometimes Morella arborea) is a species of plant in the Myricaceae family. A non-legume nitrogen fixer, it is endemic to Cameroon and Bioko. Its natural habitats are subtropical or tropical moist lowland forests, subtropical or tropical moist montane forests, and subtropical or tropical high-altitude grassland. It is threatened by habitat loss.
