= Canacomyrica =

Conservation status
- Near Threatened (IUCN 3.1)

Scientific classification
- Kingdom: Plantae
- Clade: Tracheophytes
- Clade: Angiosperms
- Clade: Eudicots
- Clade: Rosids
- Order: Fagales
- Family: Myricaceae
- Genus: Canacomyrica; Guillaumin
- Species: C. monticola

Binomial name
- Canacomyrica monticola Guillaumin

Genus of trees

Canacomyrica is a monotypic genus of flowering plants in the family Myricaceae containing the single species Canacomyrica monticola. It is endemic to New Caledonia. This endangered tree or small shrub is limited to ultramafic serpentine soils.

== Conservation ==
This species is known from eleven sites in the southern province of New Caledonia. It is threatened by mining, bushfires, and logging.
