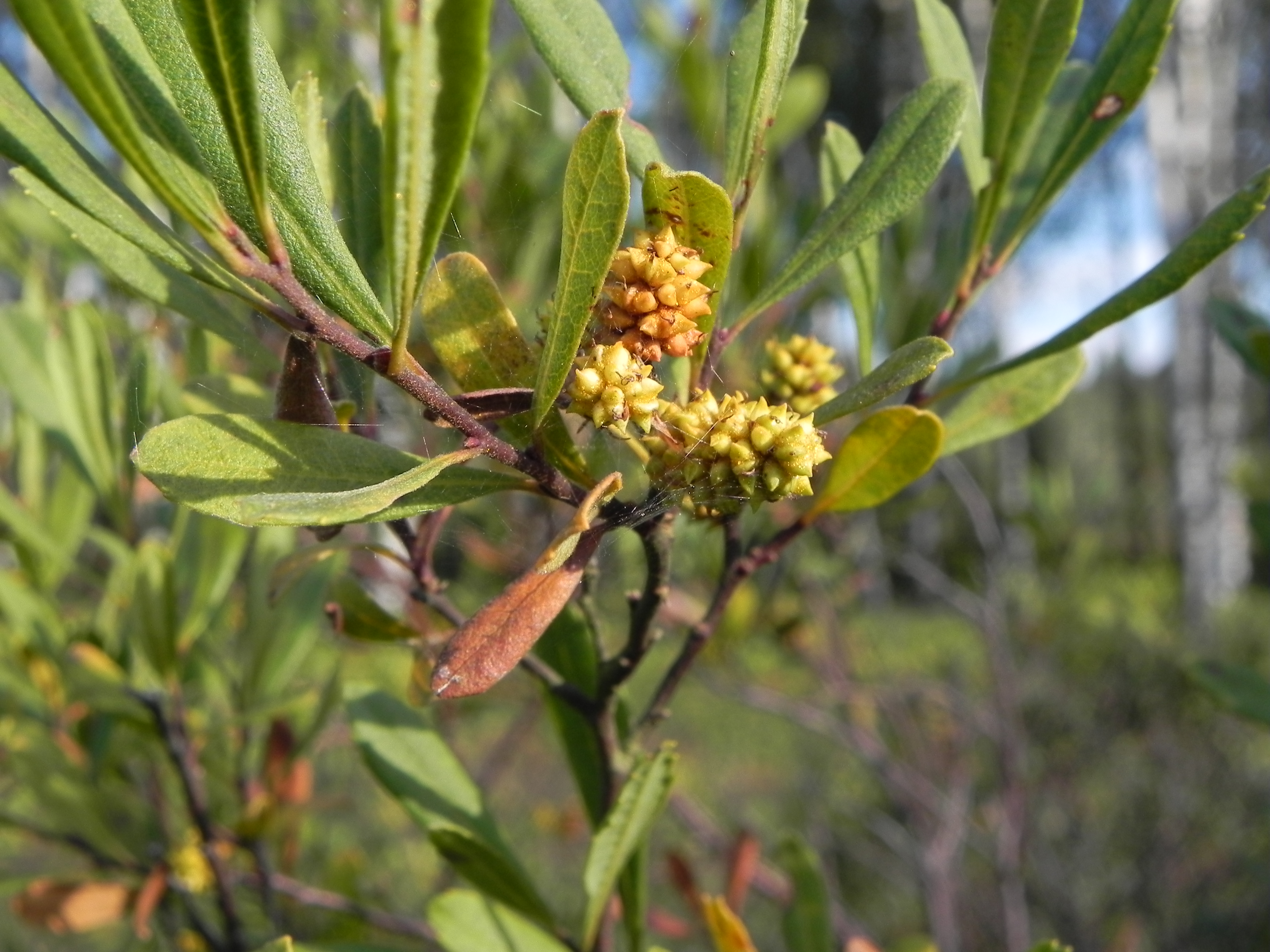
- Foliage and immature fruit

Conservation status
- Least Concern (IUCN 3.1)

Scientific classification
- Kingdom: Plantae
- Clade: Tracheophytes
- Clade: Angiosperms
- Clade: Eudicots
- Clade: Rosids
- Order: Fagales
- Family: Myricaceae
- Genus: Myrica
- Species: M. gale

Binomial name
- Myrica gale L.

Synonyms
- Gale palustris

= Myrica gale =

Species of flowering plant (bog-myrtle)

Myrica gale is a species of flowering plant in the family Myricaceae native to cool temperate regions of Eurasia and North America. Common names include bog-myrtle, sweet gale, Dutch myrtle, and sweetgale.

== Description ==
Myrica gale is an aromatic deciduous shrub growing to 2 metres (6 1/2 feet) tall, and often forms extensive dense clonal colonies from root suckers. The leaves are spirally arranged, simple, glaucous grey-green, 2–6 centimetres (3/4–2 1/4 inches) long, oblanceolate with a tapered base and broader tip, and a crinkled or finely toothed margin. Flowering is in spring, before the leaves emerge; the flowers are catkins, with the yellowish to orange-brown male catkins, and red to purple female catkins, usually on separate plants (dioecious), but occasionally on the same plant (monoecious), and individual plants may change sex from one year to another. The fruit is a small, waxy drupe. Main components of essential oils are: 1,8-cineole, α-pinene, limonene, selina-3(7)-diene, and (E)-nerolidol. The main components found in both leaf and flower essential oils are monoterpene hydrocarbons: α-pinene (12.3, 23.5.%),p-cymene (12.8, 4.9%), and limonene (11.0, 5.6%), respectively and oxygenated monoterpenes: 1,8-cineole (28.6, 44.2%).

== Ecology ==
Use by wildlife: Myrica gale is eaten in small quantities by birds. It is a favorite food of beavers and provides good habitat for salmon and water birds.

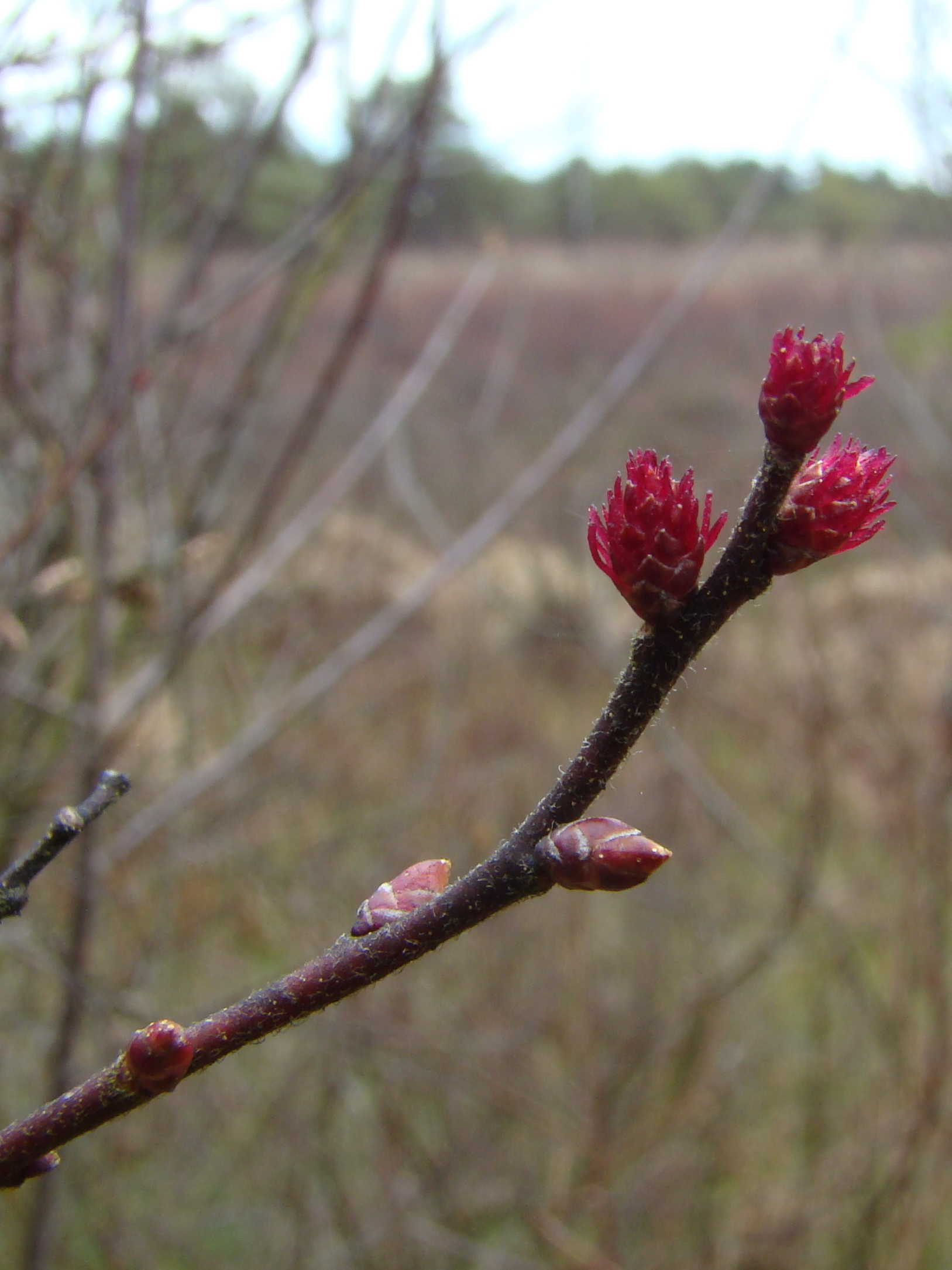
Female catkins

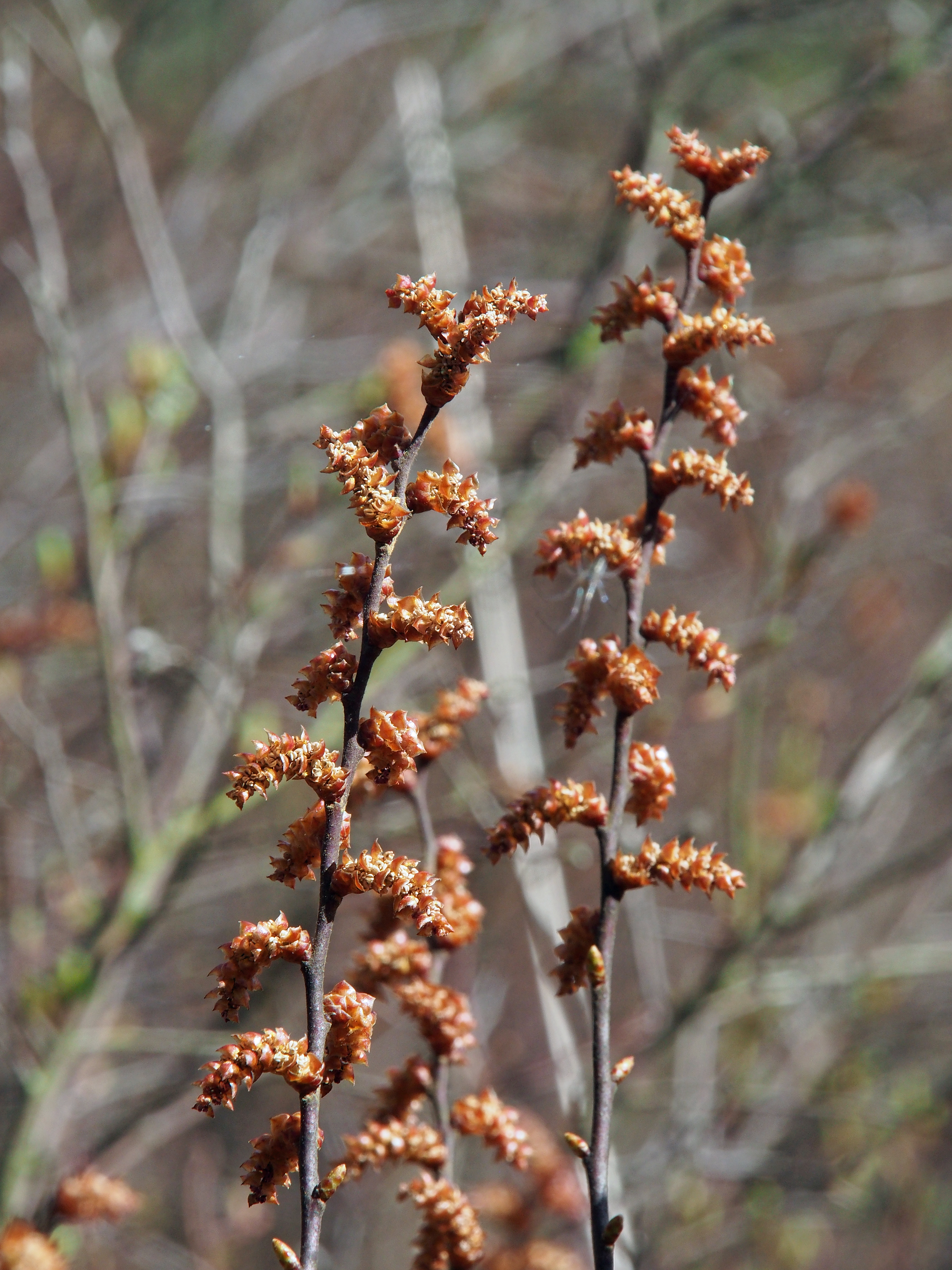
Male catkins

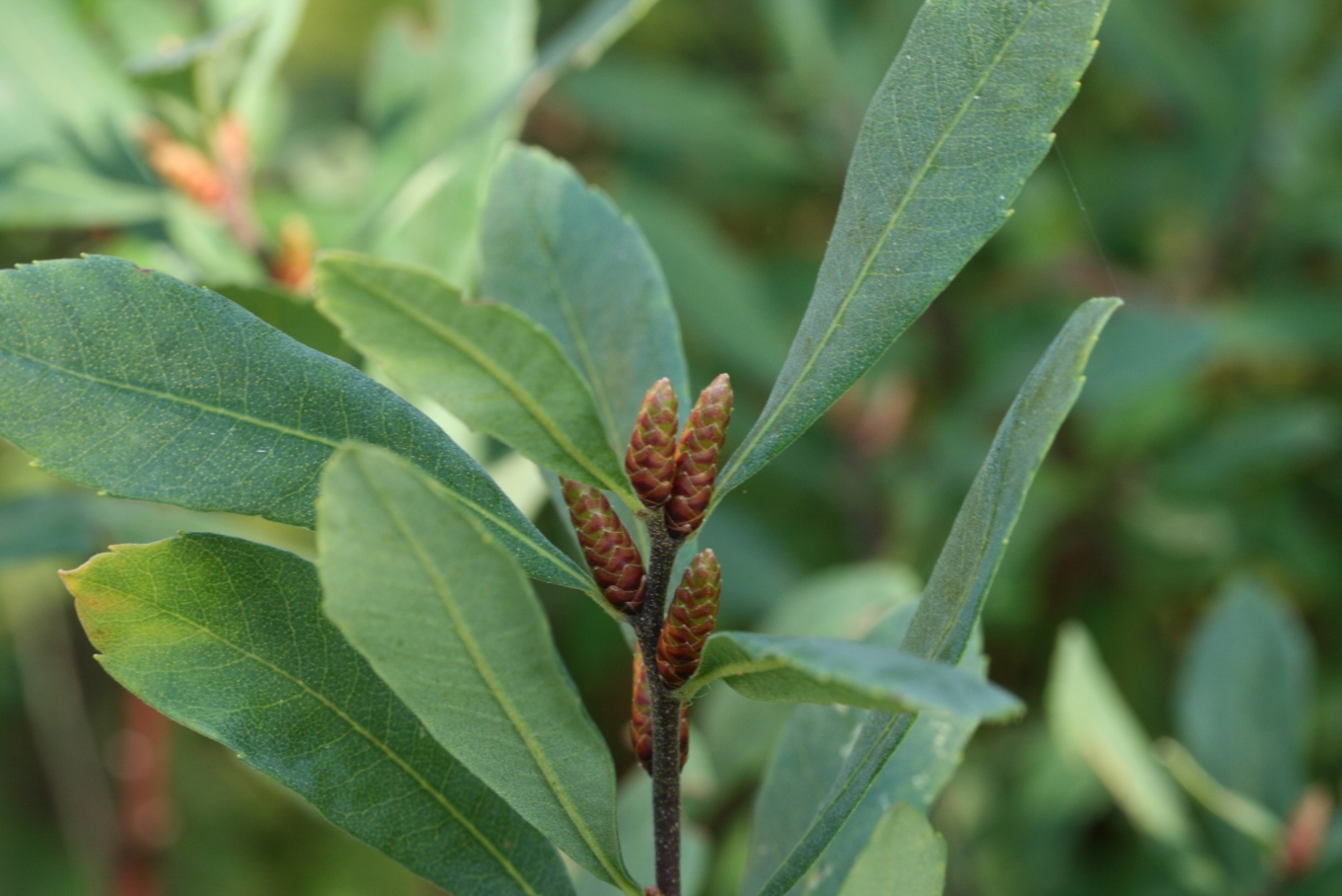
Foliage, and male catkins in bud

== Uses ==
The foliage has a sweet resinous scent and is a traditional insect repellent, used by campers to keep biting insects out of tents. It is also a traditional component of royal wedding bouquets and is used variously in perfumery and as a condiment.

In Scotland, UK, it has been traditionally used to ward off the Highland midge, and it is marketed as an insect repellent and as an ingredient in some soaps.

=== Food and medicine ===
Dried leaves and fruits have been used as a spice in soups and stews and as a flavouring for beer; roots and bark are used as a source of yellow dye for calfskin and wool; catkins and fruits as a source of wax for candles; and leaf and fruit infusions as an insecticide. It has been also used in traditional medicine as a remedy for stomach and cardiac disorders.

Its volatile oil also has a role in resistance to fungal pathogens.

The leaves can be dried to make tea, and both the nutlets and leaves can be used (either chopped or dried) to make a seasoning.

In northwestern Europe (Germany, Belgium and the Netherlands), it was much used in a mixture called gruit as a flavouring for beer from the Middle Ages to the 16th century, but it fell into disuse after hops supplanted gruit herbs for political and economic reasons. In modern times, some brewers have revisited this historic technique and in Denmark and Sweden the plant is commonly used to prepare home-flavoured schnaps.

In some native cultures in Eastern Canada, the plant has been used as a traditional remedy for stomach aches, fever, bronchial ailments, and liver problems.

In 2007, there were plans to increase production of the plant in Scotland for use as an essential oil for treating sensitive skin and acne. The plant has been listed as an abortifacient and therefore should not be consumed by people who are, or might be, pregnant.

== In culture ==
Queen Victoria was given a sprig of bog-myrtle which she planted on the Isle of Wight. Her daughter used some myrtle from this plant in her wedding bouquet, starting a royal tradition.
