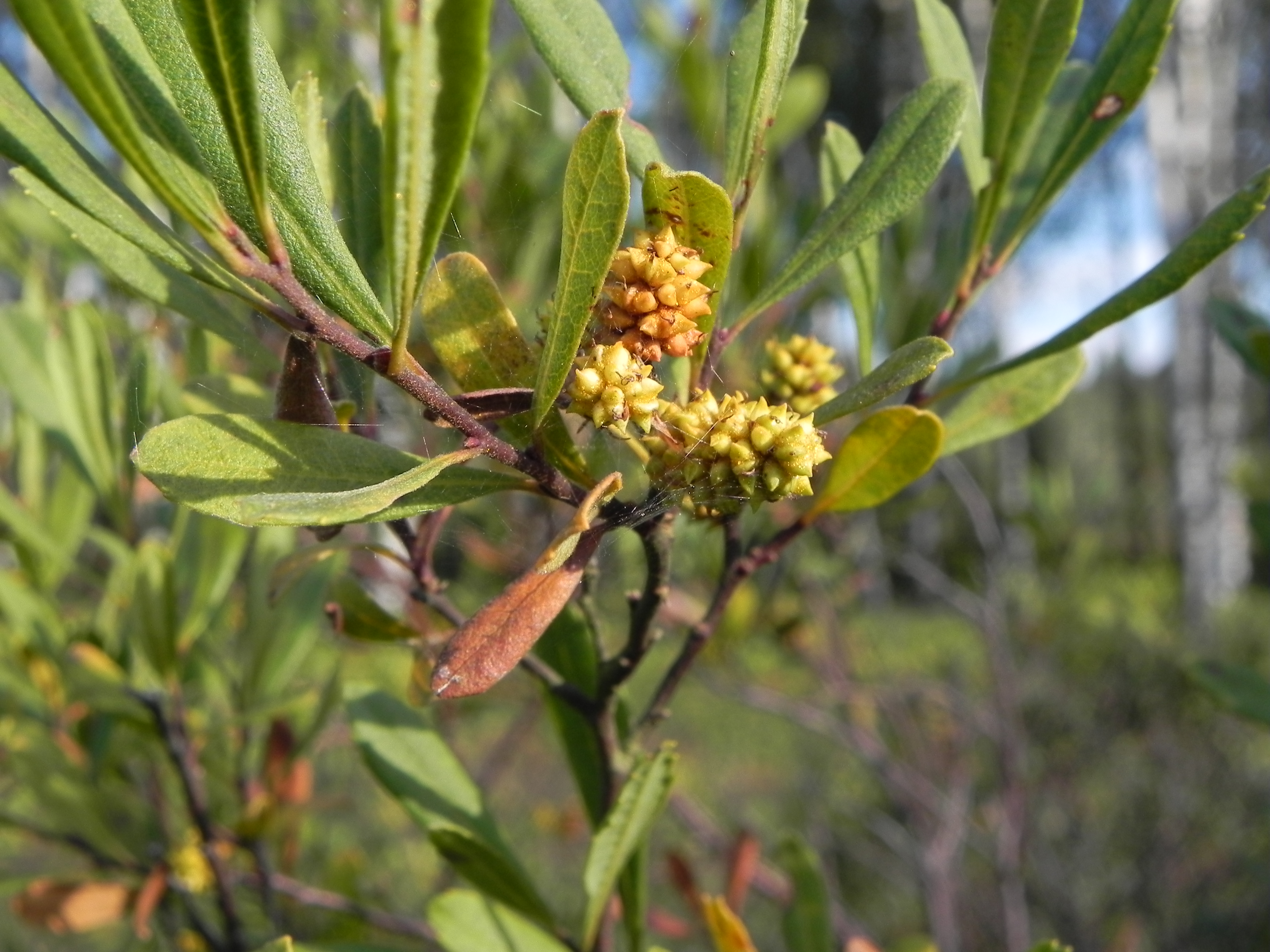
- Female Myrica gale plant

Scientific classification
- Kingdom: Plantae
- Clade: Tracheophytes
- Clade: Angiosperms
- Clade: Eudicots
- Clade: Rosids
- Order: Fagales
- Family: Myricaceae
- Genus: Myrica; L.

Type species
- Myrica gale L.

Species
- See text

Synonyms
- Angeia Tidestr.; Cerophora Raf.; Cerothamnus Tidestr.; Faya Webb & Berthel.; Fayana Raf.; Gale Duhamel; Morella Lour.; Pimecaria Raf.

= Myrica =

Genus of flowering plants

Myrica /mɪˈraɪkə/ is a genus of about 35–50 species of small trees and shrubs in the family Myricaceae, order Fagales. The genus has a wide distribution, including Africa, Asia, Europe, North America, and South America, and missing only from Antarctica and Oceania. Some botanists split the genus into two genera on the basis of the catkin and fruit structure, restricting Myrica to a few species, and treating the others in Morella.

Common names include bayberry, bay-rum tree, candleberry, sweet gale, and wax-myrtle. The generic name was derived from the Greek word μυρίκη (myrike), meaning "fragrance".

== Characteristics ==
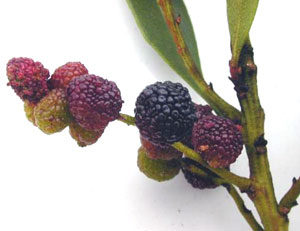
Myrica faya fruit

The species vary from 1 m (3 ft 3 in) shrubs up to 20 m (66 ft) trees; some are deciduous, but the majority of species are evergreen. The roots have nitrogen-fixing bacteria which enable the plants to grow on soils that are very poor in nitrogen content. The leaves are spirally arranged, simple, 2–12 cm (13/16–4 3/4 in) long, oblanceolate with a tapered base and broader tip, and a crinkled or finely toothed margin. The flowers are catkins, with male and female catkins usually on separate plants (dioecious). The fruit is a small drupe, usually with a wax coating.

The type species, Myrica gale, is holarctic in distribution, growing in acidic peat bogs throughout the colder parts of the Northern Hemisphere; it is a deciduous shrub growing to 1 m tall. The remaining species all have relatively small ranges, and are mostly warm-temperate.

Myrica faya (Morella faya), native to the volcanic islands of the Azores, Madeira and the Canary Islands, has become an invasive species on the Hawaiian volcanoes where it was introduced in the 19th century; its ability to fix nitrogen makes it very well adapted to growing on low-nitrogen volcanic soils.

The wax coating on the fruit is indigestible for most birds, but a few species have adapted to be able to eat it, notably the yellow-rumped warbler and tree swallow in North America. As the wax is very energy-rich, this enables the yellow-rumped warbler to winter farther north in cooler climates than any other American warbler if bayberries are present. The seeds are then dispersed in the droppings of the birds.

Myrica species are used as food plants by the larvae of some Lepidoptera species including brown-tail, emperor moth, and winter moth as well as the bucculatricid leaf-miners Bucculatrix cidarella, B. myricae (feeds exclusively on M. gale) and B. paroptila and the Coleophora case-bearers C. comptoniella, C. pruniella, and C. viminetella.

== Uses ==
Native Americans used bayberry medicinally. The root bark was pounded into powder and mixed with water to cure diarrhea. American pioneers sniffed the powder to counter nasal congestion. It was sometimes used in poultices.

The wax coating on the fruit of several species, known as bayberry wax, has been used traditionally to make candles. It was used for that purpose by the Robinson family in the novel The Swiss Family Robinson. During the Colonial Revival Movement (which peaked between 1880 and 1940), an enduring tradition began of burning bayberry wax candles during Christmas Eve and New Year’s Eve for luck, health, abundance, love, and joy.

The foliage of Myrica gale is a traditional insect repellent, used by campers to keep biting insects out of tents. Several species are also grown as ornamental plants in gardens. The fruit of Myrica rubra is an economically important crop in China, sold fresh, dried, canned, for juice, for flavoring in snacks, and for alcoholic beverages. Myrica is used to spice beer and snaps in Denmark.

The leaves can add flavor to soups and broths. They can be dried and stored in jars to be used as a spice.

== Species ==
Myrica comprises the following species:

- Myrica adenophora Hance
- Myrica arborea Hutch.
- Myrica brevifolia E.Mey. ex C.DC. – dwarf waxberry
- Myrica cacuminis Britton & P.Wilson
- Myrica californica Cham. – California bayberry
- Myrica caroliniensis Mill. – southern bayberry
- Myrica cerifera L. – wax-myrtle, southern wax-myrtle
- Myrica chevalieri (Parra-Os.) Christenh. & Byng
- Myrica chimanimaniana (Verdc. & Polhill) Christenh. & Byng
- Myrica cordifolia L. – dune waxberry
- Myrica dentulata Baill.
- Myrica esculenta Buch.-Ham. ex D.Don
- Myrica faya Aiton – faya bayberry
- Myrica funckii A.Chev.
- Myrica gale L. – sweet gale or bog-myrtle
- Myrica goetzei Engl.
- Myrica hartwegii S.Watson – Sierra bayberry
- Myrica holdridgeana Lundell
- Myrica humilis Cham.
- Myrica inodora W.Bartram – scentless bayberry
- Myrica integra (A.Chev.) Killick
- Myrica integrifolia Roxb.
- Myrica interrupta Benth.
- Myrica javanica Blume
- Myrica kandtiana Engl.
- Myrica kilimandscharica Engl.
- Myrica kraussiana Buchinger
- Myrica lindeniana C.DC.
- Myrica meyeri-johannis Engl.
- Myrica microbracteata Weim.
- Myrica mildbraedii Engl.
- Myrica nana A.Chev.
- Myrica parvifolia Benth.
- Myrica pavonis C.DC.
- Myrica pensylvanica Mirb. – northern bayberry
- Myrica phanerodonta Standl.
- Myrica picardae Krug & Urb.
- Myrica pilulifera Rendle – broad-leaved waxberry
- Myrica pringlei Greenm.
- Myrica pubescens Humb. & Bonpl. ex Willd.
- Myrica punctata Griseb.
- Myrica pusilla Raf.
- Myrica quercifolia L. – oak waxberry
- Myrica rotundata Steyerm. & Maguire
- Myrica rubra (Lour.) Siebold & Zucc. – yang mei, Chinese bayberry, yumberry
- Myrica salicifolia Hochst. ex A.Rich.
- Myrica serrata Lam. – lance-leaved waxberry
- Myrica shaferi Urb. & Britton
- Myrica singularis Parra-Os.
- Myrica spathulata Mirb.

=== Species names with uncertain taxonomic status ===
The status of the following species and hybrids is unresolved:

- Morella × macfarlanei (Youngken) Kartesz
- Morella pumila Small
- Myrica aethiopica L.
- Myrica alaternoides Crantz
- Myrica algarbiensis Gand.
- Myrica altera C.DC.
- Myrica apiculata Urb. & Ekman
- Myrica arabica Willd.
- Myrica auriculata Ridl.
- Myrica australasica F.Muell.
- Myrica banksiifolia J.C.Wendl.
- Myrica bojeriana Baker
- Myrica × burbankii A.Chev.
- Myrica burmannii E. Mey. ex C. Dc.
- Myrica capensis Steud.
- Myrica carolenensis A.Rich.
- Myrica caroliniana Ettingsh.
- Myrica conifera Burm.f.
- Myrica domingana C.DC.
- Myrica dregeana A.Chev.
- Myrica elliptica A.Chev.
- Myrica esquirolii H.Lév.
- Myrica fallax DC.
- Myrica florida Regel
- Myrica fuscata Raf.
- Myrica glabrissima A.Chev.
- Myrica hirsuta Mill.
- Myrica holtzii Engl. & Brehmer
- Myrica humbertii Staner & Lebrun
- Myrica ilicifolia Burm.f.
- Myrica jamaicensis R.A.Howard & Proctor
- Myrica laciniata Willd.
- Myrica latiloba Heer
- Myrica lobbii Teijsm. & Binn. ex Miq.
- Myrica longifolia Teijsm. & Binn. ex C.DC.
- Myrica macrophylla Mirb.
- Myrica microcarpa Benth.
- Myrica microstachya Krug & Urb.
- Myrica montana Vahl
- Myrica mossii Burtt Davy
- Myrica myrtifolia A.Chev.
- Myrica nagi Thunb.
- Myrica natalensis C.DC.
- Myrica oligadenia Peter
- Myrica ovata H.L.Wendl.
- Myrica pusilla Raf.
- Myrica reticulata Krug & Urb.
- Myrica rivas-martinezii A.Santos
- Myrica rogersii Burtt Davy
- Myrica roraimae Oliv.
- Myrica rothmaleriana P.Silva
- Myrica rotundifolia Salisb.
- Myrica tomentosa Asch. & Graebn.
- Myrica trifoliata Turpin
- Myrica trifoliata L.
- Myrica trifoliolata DC.
- Myrica undulata Raf.
- Myrica usambarensis Engl.
- Myrica verrucosa Raf.
- Myrica vidaliana Rolfe

=== Formerly placed here ===
- Balakata luzonica (as M. luzonica S.Vidal)
- Comptonia peregrina (L.) J.M.Coult. (as M. aspleniifolia L.)
- Nageia nagi (Thunb.) Kuntze (as M. nagi Thunb.)
