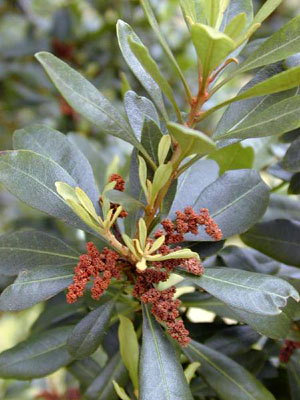
- Myrica faya foliage and male catkins

Conservation status
- Least Concern (IUCN 3.1)

Scientific classification
- Kingdom: Plantae
- Clade: Tracheophytes
- Clade: Angiosperms
- Clade: Eudicots
- Clade: Rosids
- Order: Fagales
- Family: Myricaceae
- Genus: Myrica
- Species: M. faya

Binomial name
- Myrica faya Ait.

= Myrica faya =

Species of tree

Myrica faya (firetree, faya or haya; syn. Morella faya (Ait.) Wilbur) is a species of Myrica, native to Macaronesia (the Azores, Madeira, and the Canary Islands), and possibly also western coastal mainland Portugal.

== Description ==
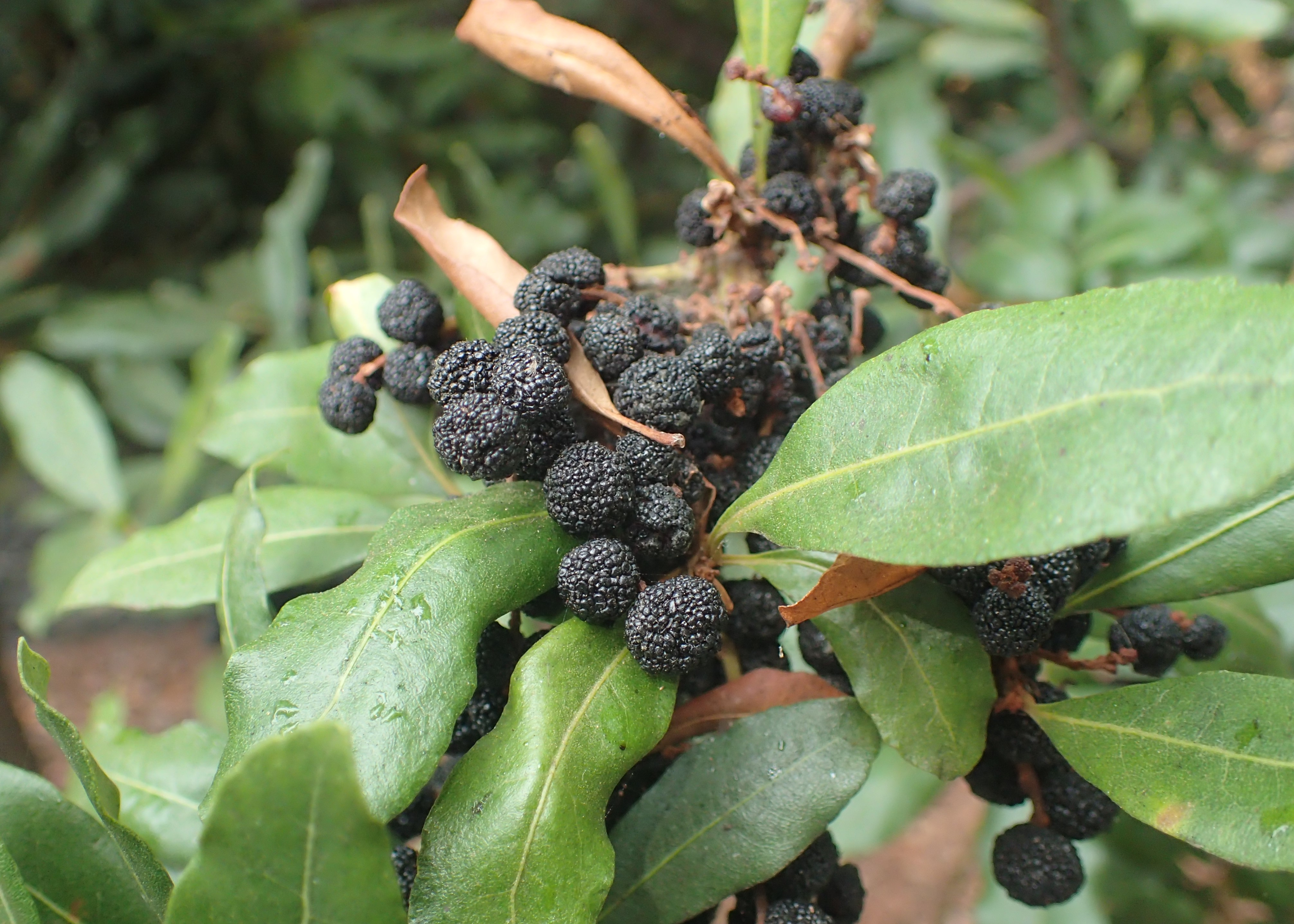
Fruit

It is an evergreen shrub or small tree 3–8 metres (9.8–26.2 ft) tall, rarely up to 15 metres (49 ft) tall. The leaves are usually a dark, glossy green, 4–11 centimetres (1.6–4.3 in) long and 1–3 centimetres (0.39–1.18 in) broad, with an entire margin and a bluntly pointed apex. It easily grows in any type of soil.

It is subdioecious, with the male and female flowers produced largely on separate plants, but often with a few flowers of the other sex present (Binggeli 1997). The male flowers have four stamens and are normally produced in clumps close to the branch. The female flowers, typically occurring in similar groups grow slightly further from the branch tips. The fruit is an edible drupe 5–6 millimetres (0.20–0.24 in) diameter, it is a reddish purple ripening dark purple to black. It is used as an astringent remedy for catarrh (Pérez 1999, Rushforth 1999).

== Distribution ==
In Macaronesian islands it occurs most abundantly at altitudes of 600–900 m. The population in Continental Portugal may be native or naturalised following early importation from Madeira or the Azores (Rushforth 1999). It is an invasive species in Hawaii (Vitousek et al. 1987), where it displaces native trees such as Metrosideros polymorpha, with profound impacts on nitrogen cycling (Vitousek & Walker 1989).
