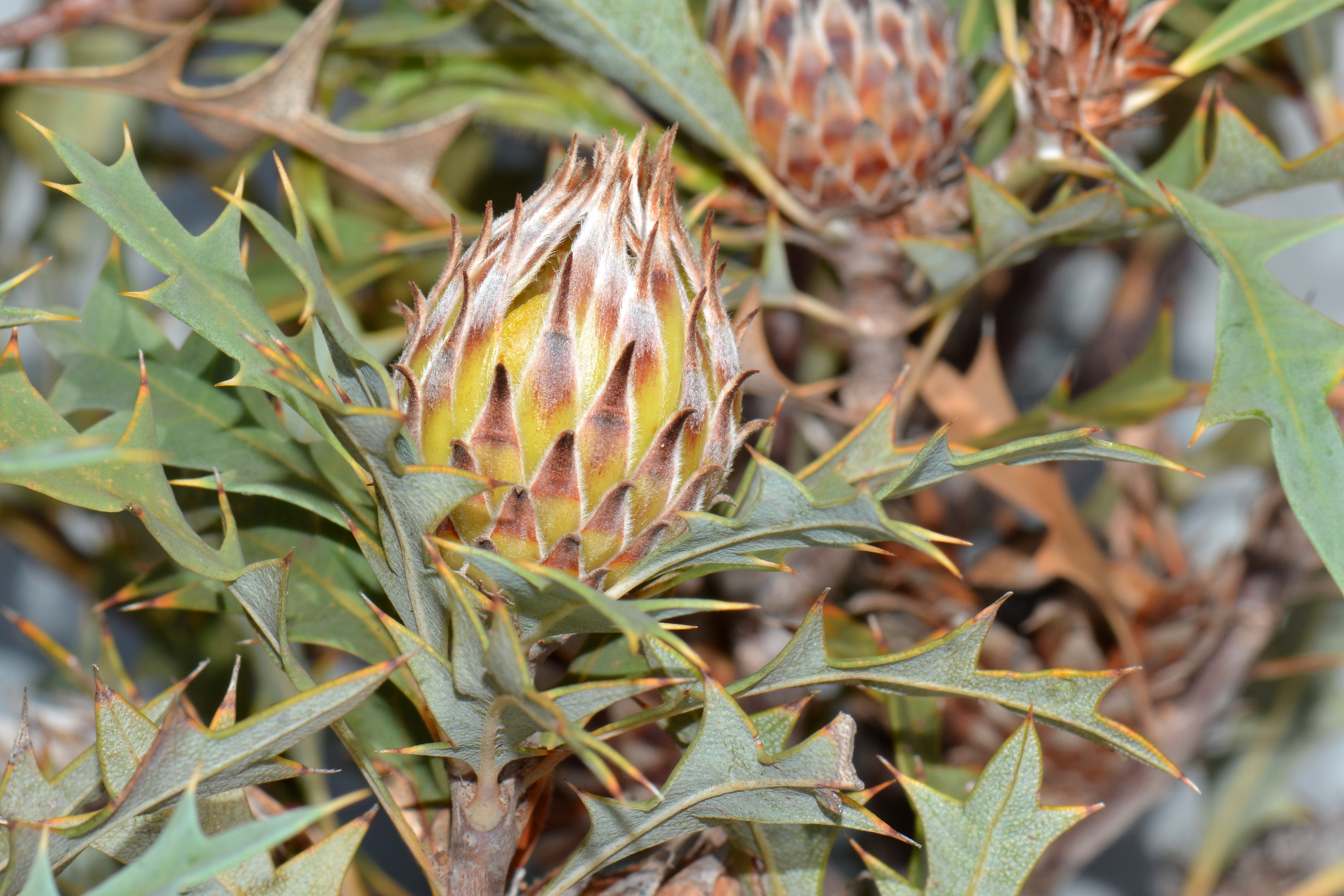

Conservation status
- Priority Four — Rare Taxa (DEC)

Scientific classification
- Kingdom: Plantae
- Clade: Tracheophytes
- Clade: Angiosperms
- Clade: Eudicots
- Order: Proteales
- Family: Proteaceae
- Genus: Banksia
- Subgenus: Banksia subg. Banksia
- Series: Banksia ser. Dryandra
- Species: B. arborea

Binomial name
- Banksia arborea (C.A.Gardner) A.R.Mast & K.R.Thiele

Synonyms
- Dryandra arborea C.A.Gardner

= Banksia arborea =

Yilgarn dryandra

Species of plant native to Western Australia

Banksia arborea, commonly known as Yilgarn dryandra, is a species of tree that is endemic to Western Australia. It has serrated, sharply pointed leaves, and yellow flowers and is found inland north of Southern Cross.

== Description ==
Banksia arborea is a tree that typically grows to a height of 6 m (20 ft) and has a thick trunk. Its leaves are elliptical to lance-shaped, 30–60 mm (1.2–2.4 in) long, 14–22 mm (0.55–0.87 in) wide and serrated with up to six sharply pointed triangular teeth on each side. The flower spikes are borne on the ends of branches and are composed of between 110 and 180 individual flowers. The perianth is 20–28 mm (0.79–1.10 in) long and yellow with shaggy hairs. Flowering mainly occurs between March and May, or in September or October and the fruit is an egg-shaped follicle 8–15 mm (0.31–0.59 in) long that opens when mature.

== Taxonomy and naming ==
Yilgarn dryandra was first formally described in 1964 by Charles Gardner who gave it the name Dryandra arborea in the Journal of the Royal Society of Western Australia from specimens he collected on hills near Koolyanobbing. In 2007, Austin Mast and Kevin Thiele changed the name to Banksia arborea. The specific epithet (arborea) is a Latin word meaning "tree-like".

== Distribution and habitat ==
Banksia arborea grows between ironstone rocks in open shrubland on hills north of Southern Cross.

== Conservation status ==
This banksia is classified as "Priority Four" by the Government of Western Australia Department of Parks and Wildlife, meaning that is rare or near threatened.

== Ecology ==
An assessment of the potential impact of climate change on this species found that its range is likely to contract by between 50% and 80% by 2080, depending on the severity of the change.
