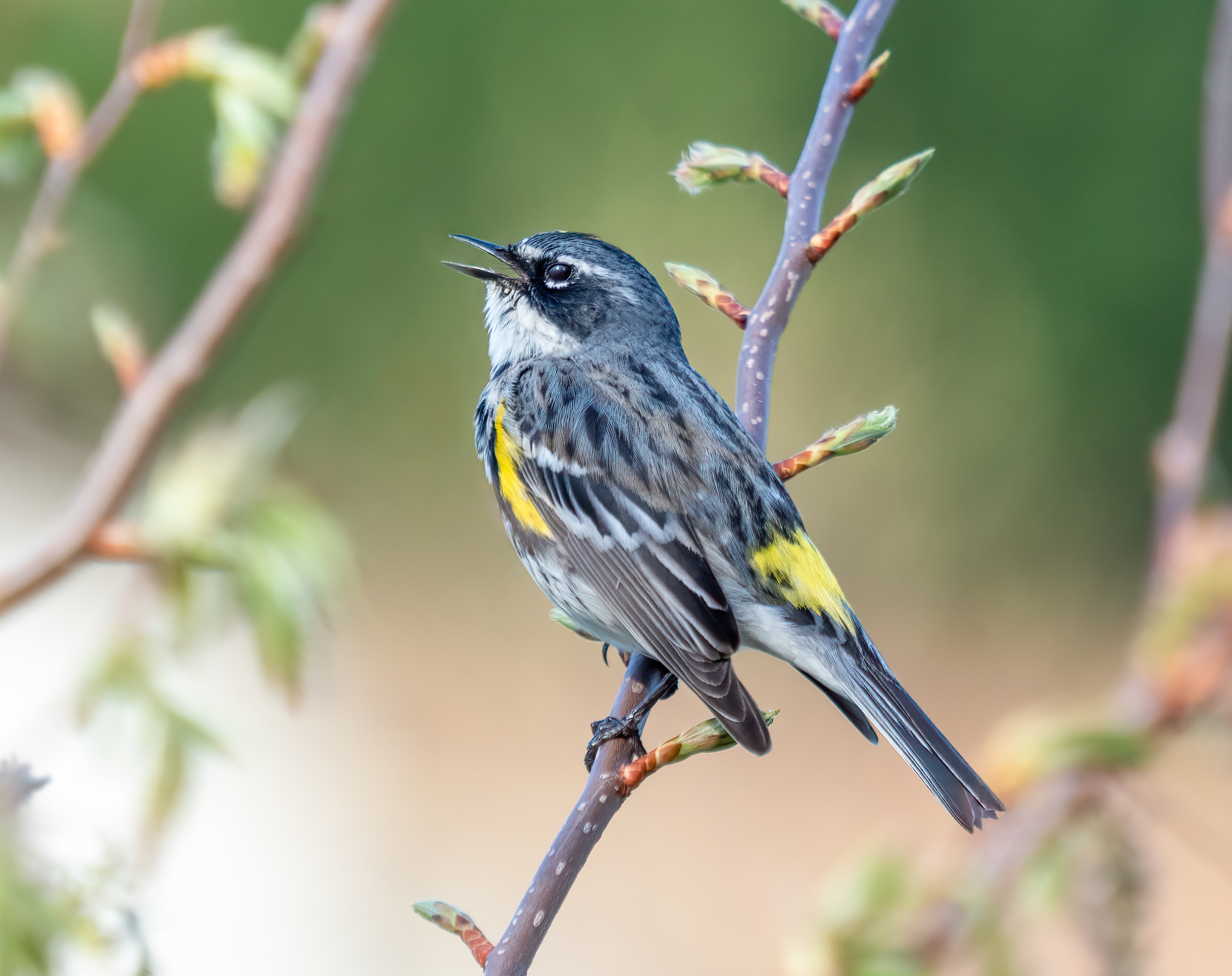
- Male myrtle yellow-rumped warbler singing
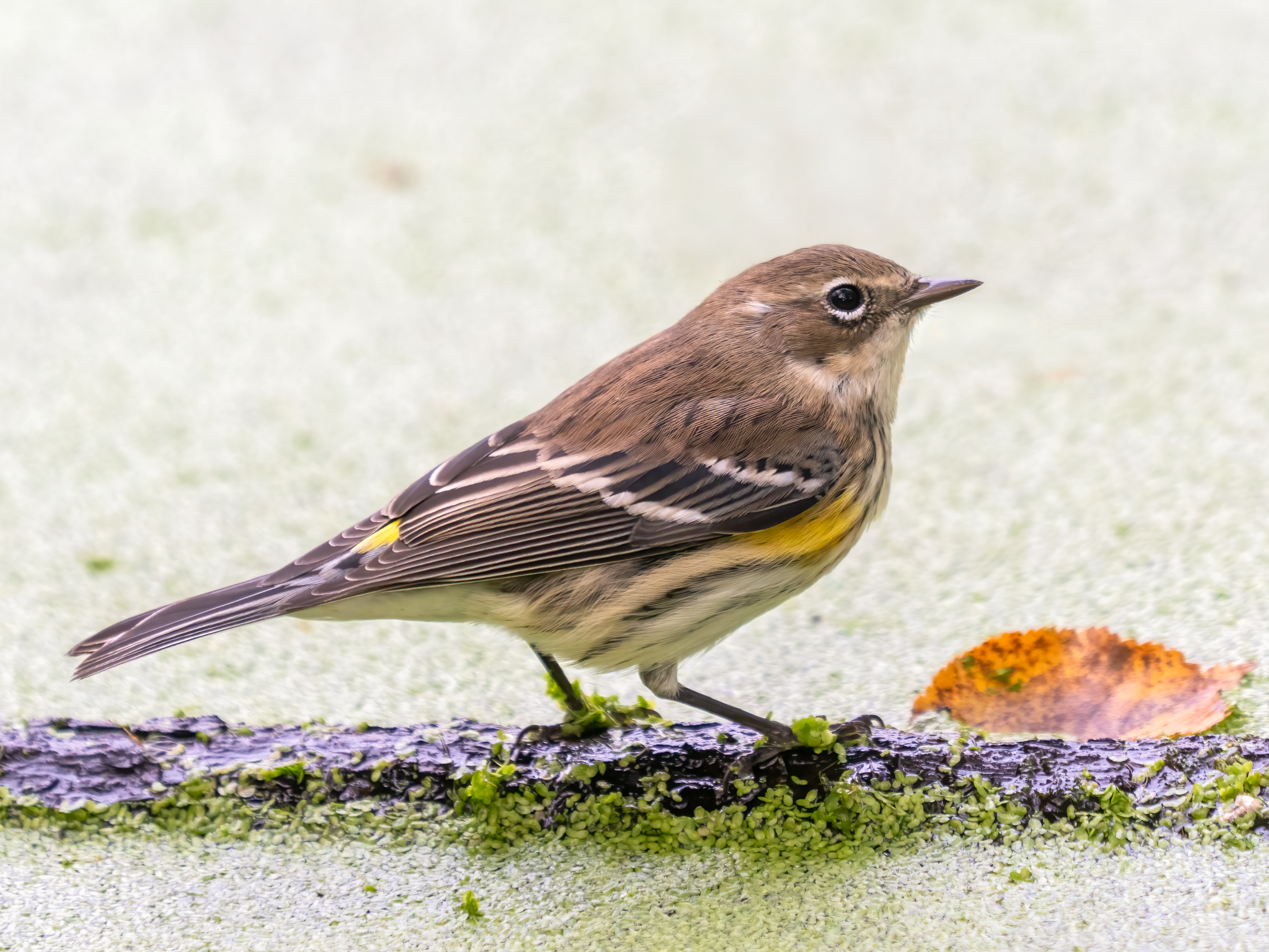
- Female myrtle yellow-rumped warbler

Conservation status
- Least Concern (IUCN 3.1)

Scientific classification
- Kingdom: Animalia
- Phylum: Chordata
- Class: Aves
- Order: Passeriformes
- Family: Parulidae
- Genus: Setophaga
- Species: S. coronata

Binomial name
- Setophaga coronata (Linnaeus, 1766)
- Approximate distribution range of S. coronata coronata Nonbreeding Breeding Migration

Synonyms
- Motacilla coronata Linnaeus, 1766; Dendroica coronata (Linnaeus, 1766)

= Yellow-rumped warbler =

Species of bird

The yellow-rumped warbler (Setophaga coronata) is a North American bird species that can be commonly observed all across the continent. Its extensive range connects both the Pacific and Atlantic coasts of the U.S. as well as Canada and Central America, with the population concentrated in the continent's northern reaches during the breeding season and migrating southwards to southern North and Central America in the winter. It generally prefers coniferous forests or mixed coniferous-deciduous forests as its breeding habitat, while during the winter it can be found inhabiting more open areas such as shrublands that offer food resources. The yellow-rumped warbler is primarily insectivorous, though the species eats fruit such as juniper berries, especially in winter.

The species combines four closely related forms: the eastern myrtle warbler (spp. coronata); its western counterpart, Audubon's warbler (spp. group auduboni); the northwest Mexican black-fronted warbler (spp. nigrifrons); and the Guatemalan Goldman's warbler (spp. goldmani). All subspecies of the yellow-rumped warbler are characterized by the yellow rump as its name implies, while intra-group and inter-group variations in appearance exist in spite of many similarities. The myrtle and Audubon's groups, as two major subspecies, are distinguished by noticeable features such as differing throat colorations.

== Taxonomy ==
The yellow-rumped warbler was formally described in 1766 by the Swedish naturalist Carl Linnaeus in the twelfth edition of his Systema Naturae under the binomial name Motacilla coronata. The specific epithet is from Latin coronatus meaning "crowned". Linnaeus based his account on the "golden-crowned fly-catcher" that had been described and illustrated in 1760 by the English naturalist George Edwards using specimens that had been sent to him from Pennsylvania by the American naturalist William Bartram. The type locality was restricted to Philadelphia by the American Ornithologists' Union in 1910. The yellow-rumped warbler is now placed in the genus Setophaga that was introduced by the English naturalist William Swainson in 1827. The genus name Setophaga combines the Ancient Greek σης/sēs, σητος/sētos meaning "moth" with -φαγος/-phagos meaning "-eating".

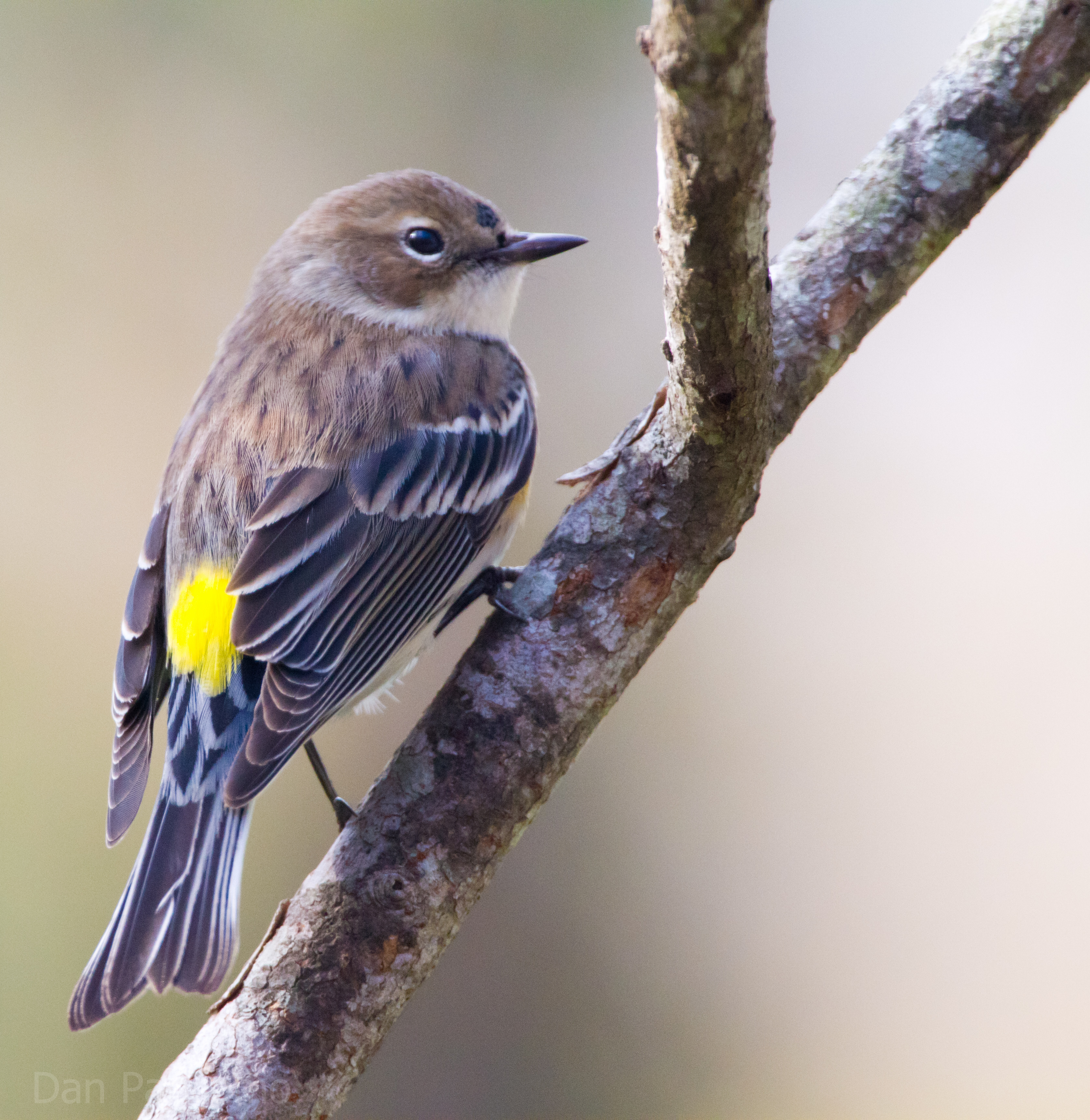
In summer, adult females have streaked backs of black on blue-green and conspicuous yellow patches on the crown, flank, and rump. This individual is a myrtle warbler, as shown by the white throat.

Five subspecies are recognised:

- S. c. hooveri (McGregor, RC, 1899) – breeds Alaska and northwestern Canada; winters to western United States and Central America (Note: Subspecies not included in the 2025 release of the Clements Checklist.)
- S. c. coronata (Linnaeus, C, 1766) – breeds south-central and southeastern Canada to north-central and northeastern United States; winters to Central America and Caribbean
- S. c. auduboni (Townsend, JK, 1837) – Audubon's warbler – breeds southwestern Canada and western United States; winters to western Honduras
- S. c. nigrifrons (Brewster, W, 1889) – Black-fronted warbler – Sierra Madre Occidental of western Mexico (Chihuahua to Durango)
- S. c. goldmani (Nelson, EW, 1897) – Goldman's warbler – high mountains of southern Chiapas (Volcán Tacaná) and western Guatemala

Since 1973, the American Ornithological Society has elected to merge the above forms into one species. A 2017 proposal to split the yellow-rumped warbler into separate species failed. By contrast, the IOC World Bird List classifies the myrtle, Audubon's, and Goldman's as separate species (Setophaga coronata, Setophaga auduboni, and Setophaga goldmani, respectively), and the black-fronted warbler as a subspecies of S. auduboni. The bird's proper taxonomy remains a matter of debate. AviList, a recent attempt to harmonize competing taxonomies, provisionally retains Setophaga coronata as a single species pending further research into the contact zone between the myrtle and Audubon's forms.

The myrtle form was apparently separated from the others by glaciation during the Pleistocene, and the Audubon's form may have originated more recently through hybridization between the myrtle warbler and the Mexican nigrifrons form.

== Description ==
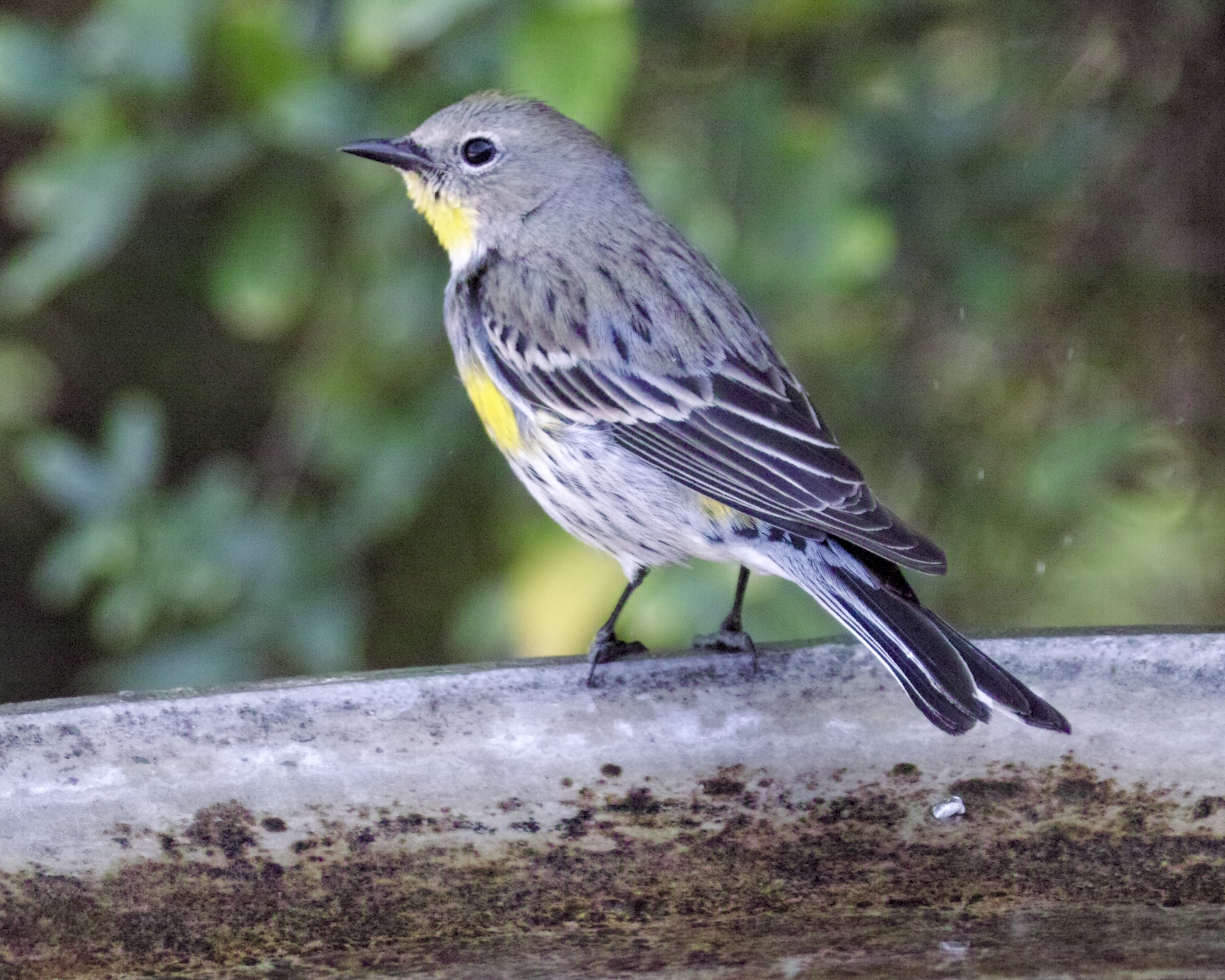
A yellow-rumped warbler belonging to the auduboni group because of its yellow throat.

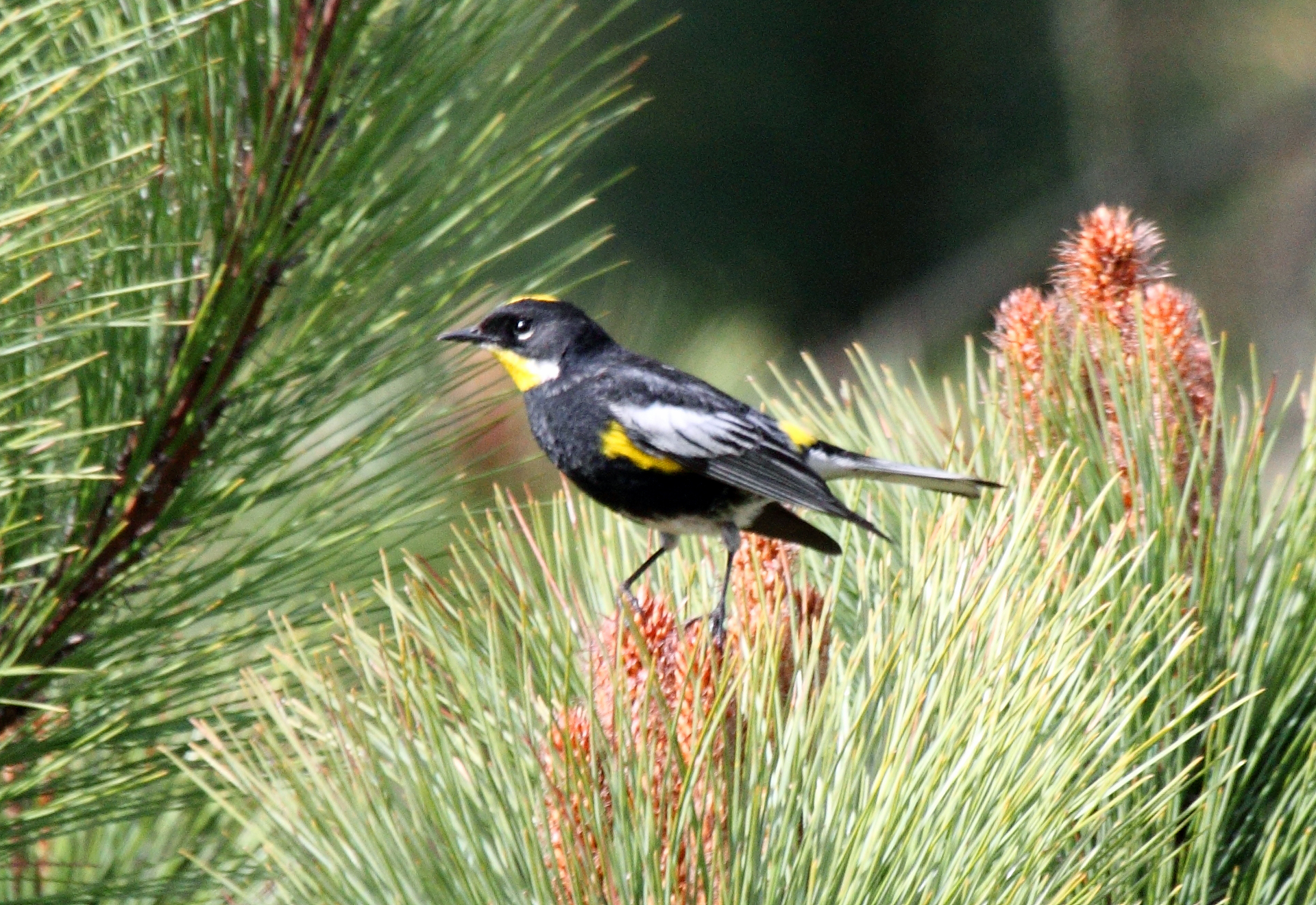
Goldman's Warbler (ssp. goldmani) in Guatemala

The yellow-rumped warbler has an average length of 14 cm and weight of 12.5 g, its appearance is different across its subspecies groups, especially the two major ones: the coronata group (myrtle warbler) and the auduboni group (Audubon's warbler); intra-group variations are also observed. In spite of varying appearances, the yellow rump (as suggested by its name) is present in all subspecies and thus characterizes the yellow-rumped warbler. Within the myrtle warbler group, adult males during the breeding season have gray backs with dark streaks, while females have brown backs; male and female myrtle warblers can also be distinguished by their different cheek colors, with the former's being black and the latter having brown or gray cheeks. The Audubon's subspecies group is not very dissimilar to the myrtle: in summers, males of both forms have streaked backs of black on slate blue, white wing patches, a streaked breast, and conspicuous yellow patches on the crown, flank, and rump (the latter giving rise to the species's nickname "butter butt" among birdwatchers). Yet the color of the coronata and auduboni groups' throat patches differs and distinguishes them, as the Audubon's warbler sports a yellow throat patch while the myrtle warbler has a white throat and eye stripe, and a contrasting black cheek patch. Females of both forms are more dull, with brown streaking front and back, but still have noticeable yellow rumps. Goldman's warbler, found in Guatemala, resembles Audubon's but has a white lower border to the yellow throat and otherwise darker plumage; males replace the slate blue of Audubon's with black.

Comprising most of the species of the New World warbler family, among the genus Setophaga (formerly Dendroica), the yellow-rumped warbler is a mid-to-large sized species. The total length of the species can range from 12 to 15 cm (4.7 to 5.9 in) long, with a wingspan of 19 to 24 cm (7.5 to 9.4 in). Although the length is only slightly greater than other Setophaga warblers, it can be mildly to significantly heavier than most other North American species, although blackpoll warblers are slightly larger still. Body mass can vary from 9.9 to 17.7 g (0.35 to 0.62 oz), though averages between 11 and 14 g (0.39 and 0.49 oz). Among standard measurements, the wing chord is 6.3 to 8.4 cm (2.5 to 3.3 in), the tail is 5 to 6.6 cm (2.0 to 2.6 in), the bill is 0.8 to 1.1 cm (0.31 to 0.43 in) and the tarsus is 1.8 to 2.2 cm (0.71 to 0.87 in).

The yellow-rumped warbler has a trill-like song of 4–7 syllables (tyew-tyew-tyew-tyew, tew-tew-tew) and an occasional check or chip call note.

== Distribution ==
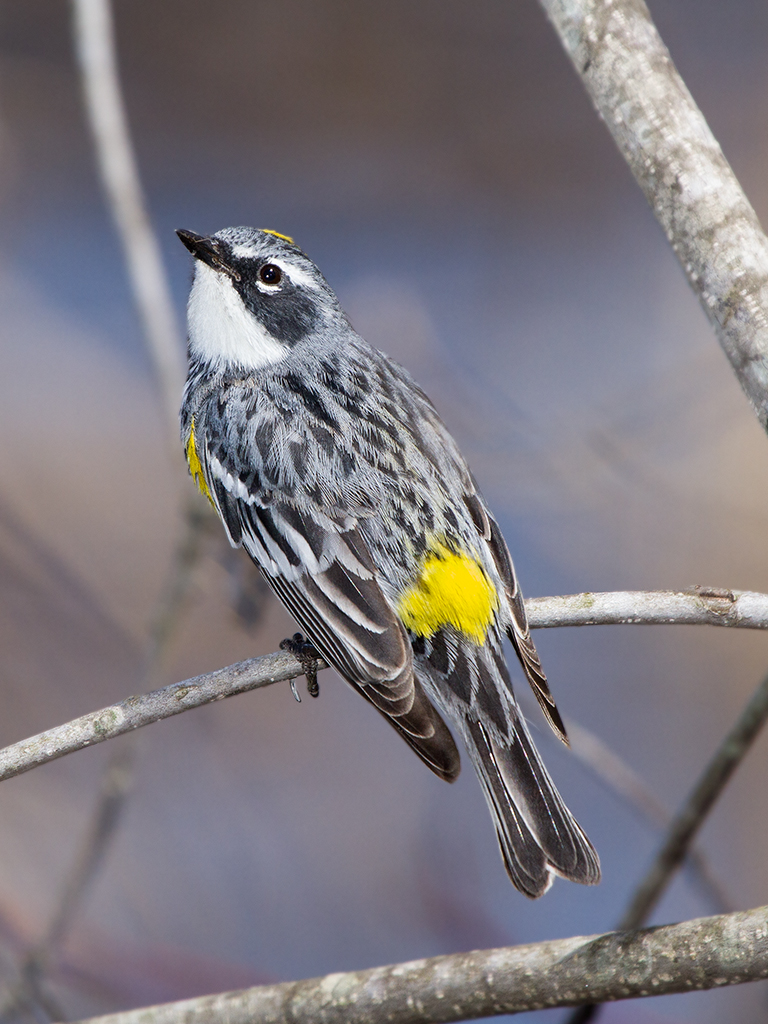
Summer adult male `has slate-blue backs and yellow crowns (barely visible here). As a male myrtle warbler, this individual has a black "mask."

The yellow-rumped warbler breeds from eastern North America west to the Pacific, and southward from there into Western Mexico. Goldman's yellow-rumped warbler is a non-migratory endemic within the highlands of Guatemala, and the black-fronted warbler is a non-migratory Mexican endemic. The myrtle and Audubon's forms are migratory, wintering in the southern U.S., Mexico, Central America, and the Caribbean.

The breeding area of the myrtle warbler ranges from Alaska across Canada to Newfoundland, and as far south as Massachusetts and mountains of Virginia, including throughout the northern Great Lakes region. Myrtle warblers migrate south for the winter, ranging from southern British Columbia all the way to Panama and throughout most of the southeastern United States.

Audubon's warbler breeds throughout western North America, from British Columbia to California, across the Rocky Mountains and as far east as the Dakotas. Among warblers, the Audubon's is by far the most widespread in North America in winter, being among the last to leave in the fall and among the first to return in spring.

=== Migration ===
The yellow-rumped warbler's migratory behavior varies across different groups and subspecies. Some individuals in Central America, such as in Mexico and Guatemala, migrate only limitedly or do not migrate at all; while individuals in the northern parts of the continent may either migrate to Central America or winter near their breeding area along the Pacific Coast of the U.S. The birds tend to migrate at night; and during the yellow-rumped warbler's migration in spring, it often relies on skylight polarization as a way to navigate and orient at dusk. The general direction of its migratory route maintains southwards during winter, as more individuals are present in Central America and southern parts of North America during the season, while less are observed in the north. Every year, fall migration usually takes place from September to November, spring migration from April to May, and the species known to depart from its winter habitats from March to April. Before migration, the yellow-rumped warbler gains weight and stores more fat in its body as a preparation for this energy-intensive activity, by increasing net energy intake from feeding, along with a refined diet that gives priority to food that supplies more energy.

== Habitat ==
=== Habitat in breeding range ===
During the breeding season, the yellow-rumped warbler is generally known to be residing in either exclusively coniferous areas across the North American continent, or mixed coniferous-deciduous habitats where coniferous forests merge with trees like aspen (Populus spp.) and willow (Salix spp.), etc. Many of its habitats in the western U.S. tend to be mountainous, but it can also inhabit places at the sea level as long as there are conifers present—which is the case of its habitats in the Pacific Northwest and the New England region of the United States. Studies indicate that the yellow-rumped warbler is generally adaptive to changes in its breeding habitat's tree density (usually as a result of selective logging), as its population densities are found to remain largely unaffected in areas where the logging regime leads to decreasing densities of trees; the yellow-rumped warbler is believed to be capable of maintaining its breeding density in habitats as long as there still exists some mature trees, which may be used for nesting. The nest of the Audubon's warbler group is known to have the shape of a deep cup: its frame is built out of twigs, barks, and fiber, etc.; the surrounding rim of the "cup" is woven by softer materials such as grass, hair, and feather, etc., structured in a way to conceal the eggs from predators when parent warblers are absent from the nest.

=== Habitat in non-breeding range ===
During the winter, when the yellow-rumped warbler is not in breeding season, it often inhabits resourceful open areas with shrubs or scattered trees which can provide it with some source of food, such as bayberries or insects. Open areas preferred by the yellow-rumped warbler may include agricultural and residential areas, secondary forests, and shrublands, as these habitats generally do not have very dense vegetation; the species can also inhabit forests that are relatively open, such as mangroves, pine forests, and even coffee plantations. The yellow-rumped warbler tends to occupy more diversified habitats during the migration process; although it is sometimes found in the deserts of the American southwest, it is more commonly found in alpine areas during migration, as it tends to arid lowlands.

== Behavior ==
=== Diet and foraging ===
Audubon's and myrtle warblers are among North America's most abundant neotropical migrants. While they are primarily insectivorous, the species is perhaps the most versatile foragers of all warblers. Beyond gleaning from leaves like other New World warblers, they often flit, flycatcher-like, out from their perches in short loops, to catch flying insects. Other places yellow-rumped warblers have been spotted foraging include picking at insects on washed-up seaweed at the beach, skimming insects from the surface of rivers and the ocean, picking them out of spiderwebs, and grabbing them off piles of manure. Common foods include caterpillars and other larvae, leaf beetles, bark beetles, weevils, ants, scale insects, aphids, grasshoppers, caddisflies, craneflies, and gnats, as well as spiders. They also eat spruce budworm, a serious forest pest, during outbreaks.

When bugs are scarce, the myrtle warbler also eats fruit, including the wax-myrtle berries which gave the myrtle subspecies its name. It is the only warbler able to digest such waxy material. The ability to use these fruits allows it to winter farther north than other warblers, sometimes as far north as Newfoundland. Other commonly eaten fruits may include juniper berries, poison ivy, poison oak, greenbrier, grapes, Virginia creeper and dogwood. They eat wild seeds such as from beach grasses and goldenrod, and they may come to feeders, where they'll take sunflower seeds, raisins, peanut butter, and suet. On their wintering grounds in Mexico they've been seen sipping the sweet honeydew liquid excreted by aphids. Male yellow-rumped warblers tend to forage higher in the trees than females do. While foraging with other warbler species, they sometimes aggressively displace other species, including pine warblers and Blackburnian warblers.

=== Breeding ===
Audubon's and the myrtle nest in coniferous and mixed woodlands, and lay 4–5 eggs. Females build the nest, sometimes using material the male carries to her. The nest is a cup of twigs, pine needles, grasses, and rootlets. She may also use moose, horse, and deer hair, moss, and lichens. She lines this cup with fine hair and feathers, sometimes woven into the nest in such a way that they curl up and over the eggs. The nest takes about 10 days to build. Nests are located on the horizontal branch of a conifer, anywhere from 1.2 to 15 m (3.9 to 49.2 ft) high. Tree species include hemlock, spruce, white cedar, pine, Douglas-fir, and larch or tamarack. They may build their nests far out on a main branch or tuck it close to the trunk in a secure fork of two or more branches. Occasionally nests are built in a deciduous tree such as a maple, oak or birch. The eggs are incubated for 12 to 13 days. Nestlings are helpless and naked at hatching but grow quickly. The young are brooded for 10 to 14 days, at which point they can fledge.
