= Arborea (disambiguation) =

Arborea is a town and comune in the province of Oristano, Sardinia, Italy.

Arborea may also refer to:

- Giudicato of Arborea, an historical state in Sardinia
- Arborea, a village in George Enescu Commune, Botoşani County, Romania
- Arborea (Dungeons & Dragons), a fictional place in the Dungeons & Dragons role-playing game
- The Exiled Realm of Arborea, the titular setting of the MMORPG TERA
- Arborea (band), an American psych folk/indie-rock folk duo
- Arborea (genus), an Ediacaran fossil originally synonymous with Charniodiscus.
- Ulmus pumila var. arborea, the Turkestan elm, a tree endemic to western Siberia and Turkestan
