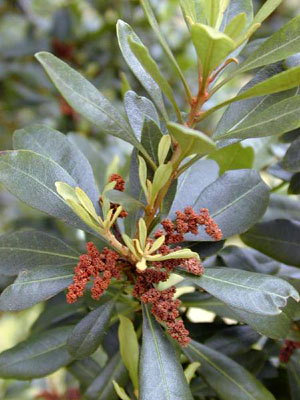
- Myrica faya

Scientific classification
- Kingdom: Plantae
- Clade: Tracheophytes
- Clade: Angiosperms
- Clade: Eudicots
- Clade: Rosids
- Order: Fagales
- Family: Myricaceae; A.Rich. ex Kunth

Type genus
- Myrica L.

Genera
- See here
- The range of Myricaceae

= Myricaceae =

Family of shrubs

Myricaceae is a small family of dicotyledonous shrubs and small trees in the order Fagales.

== Taxonomy ==
Its type genus is Myrica, the sweet gales. There are three genera in the family, although some botanists separate many species from Myrica into a fourth genus Morella. About 55 species are usually accepted in Myrica (with Morella included), one in Canacomyrica, and one in Comptonia.

Well-known members of this family include bayberry and sweetfern.

=== Genera ===
It has three genera:

- Canacomyrica Guillaumin
- Comptonia L'Hér.
- Myrica L. (includes Morella Lour.)

=== Phylogeny ===
Modern molecular phylogenetics suggest the following relationships:

- - Juglandaceae (outgroup)
  - Myricaceae
    - Canacomyrica
    - - Comptonia
      - - Myrica
        - Morella
