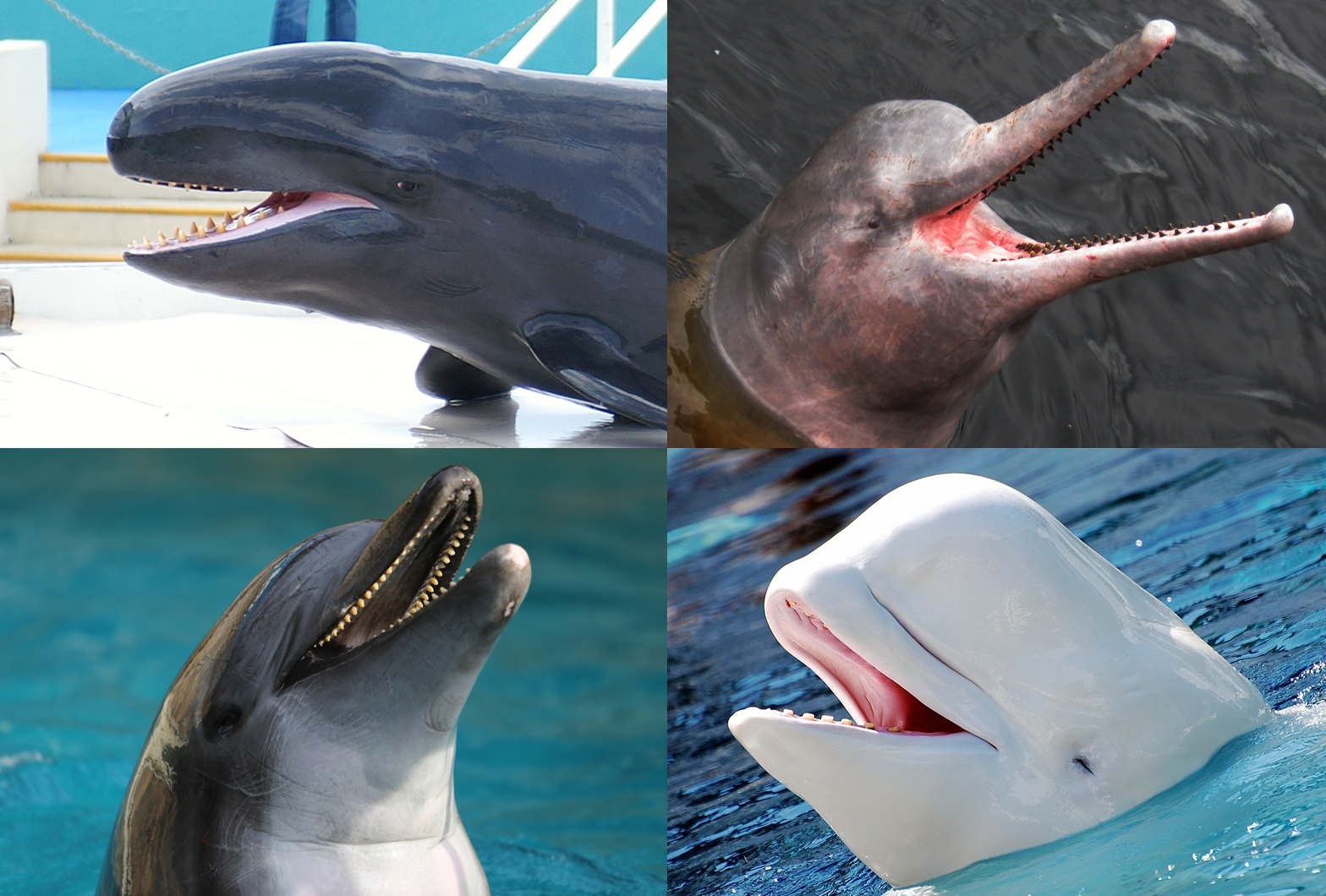
- Clockwise from top left: false killer whale, Amazon river dolphin, beluga, and bottlenose dolphin

Scientific classification
- Kingdom: Animalia
- Phylum: Chordata
- Class: Mammalia
- Order: Artiodactyla
- Infraorder: Cetacea
- Parvorder: Odontoceti; Flower, 1867

Subgroups
- †Ashleycetidae; †Xenorophidae; Amblyoccipita; †Simocetidae; Stegoceti; †Agorophiidae; †Waipatiidae; †Squalodontidae; Crown Odontoceti

Diversity
- About 73 species in 10 families

= Toothed whale =

Toothed whale Temporal range: 33.9–0 Ma Early Oligocene to present

Parvorder of cetaceans

The toothed whales (also called odontocetes, systematic name Odontoceti) are a parvorder of cetaceans that includes dolphins, porpoises, and all other whales with teeth, such as beaked whales (even though in most beaked whales species only the males have a few teeth and the females none) and the sperm whales. 73 species of toothed whales are described. They are one of two living groups of cetaceans, with the other being the baleen whales (Mysticeti), which have baleen instead of teeth. The two groups are thought to have diverged around 34 million years ago (mya).

Toothed whales range in size from the 1.4 m (4.6 ft) and 54 kg (119 lb) vaquita to the 20 m (66 ft) and 100 t (98 long tons; 110 short tons) sperm whale. Several species of odontocetes exhibit sexual dimorphism, in that there are size or other morphological differences between females and males. As other cetaceans, they have streamlined bodies and the forelimbs are modified into flippers, while the hindlimbs and pelvis are reduced to vestigial structures not visible from the outside. Propulsion is provided by the horizontal tail fluke. Some can travel at up to 30 knots. Most odontocetes rely on suction feeding to catch their prey, although many species have numerous conical teeth designed for grabbing fish or squid. They have very well-developed underwater hearing, with highest sensitivity in the ultrasonic range, which is linked to their echolocation. Echolocation is the primary sense of odontocetes and they are able to survive on their own, even if completely blind. Some species are well adapted for diving to great depths, most notably the sperm whale and the beaked whales, but also pilot whales. Almost all have a layer of fat, or blubber, under the skin to keep warm in the cold water, with the exception of river dolphins.

Among the toothed whale species are some with the widest distribution among mammals, such as the cosmopolitic sperm whale and orca; but also some with very small geographical rages, such as the vaquita (only in the northern Gulf of California), and Indus and Ganges river dolphins (restricted to parts of Indus and Ganges rivers, respectively). Odontocetes feed largely on fish and squid, but a few, such as the orca, may feed on other marine mammals. Social structure varies between species, from species such as harbour porpoise, often encountered alone or in small groups; over species such as orca and pilot whales, with well-organized matrilineal family groups; to species such as common dolphin, that can form pods of hundreds of individuals. All species studies are polygynous, meaning that males compete over access to females and successful males may mate with multiple females.

Many toothed whales have been extensively hunted, primarily for whale oil, but also for food. The sperm whale was particularly valued because of the spermaceti, which was used for high-quality candles and in mechanical engineering, but also bottlenose whale and many porpoises and dolphins were targeted. Many toothed whales are protected by a network of international treaties and agreements but only the sperm whale is covered by the 1986 moratorium on whaling agreed by the International Whaling Commission. Hunting of small odontocetes for food is still practiced in Arctic regions, as well as in Japan and on the Faroe Islands. However, the primary pressures on odontocete species today is not hunting. The two most endangered species of odontocetes, the baiji found in the Yangtze River - considered functionally extinct by IUCN, and the vaquita from the Gulf of California, are thus endangered because of habitat destruction and bycatch. Also marine pollution is a significant pressure factor on odontocetes.

Toothed whales, as the baleen whales, have significant cultural significance and often featured in literature and film. Most notably the great white sperm whale Moby-Dick of author Herman Melville, but also dolphins, such as the bottlenose dolphin Flipper featured in the TV and movie franchise from 1963 and onwards, and the orca Keiko, featured in the movie franchise Free Willy from 1993 and onwards. Small odontocetes, mainly dolphins, are kept in captivity for display, entertainment and research purposes and whale watching tours for dolphins, porpoises and sperm whales operate around the world.

== Systematics ==
Relationship of toothed whale families

- Toothed whales
  - - Sperm whales (Physeteridae)
    - Dwarf sperm whales (Kogiidae)
  - - South Asian river dolphins (Platanistidae)
    - - Beaked whales (Ziphiidae)
      - - Inioidea
          - Yangtze river dolphin (Lipotidae)
          - - Pontoporiidae
            - Iniidae
        - Delphinoidea
          - Oceanic dolphins (Delphinidae)
          - - Porpoises (Phocoenidae)
            - Belugas, narwhals (Monodontidae)

Modern (crown) odontocetes are divided in ten families

- Parvorder Odontoceti
  - Superfamily Physeteroidea
    - Family Physeteroidae (sperm whales)
    - Family Kogiidae (dwarf sperm whales)
  - Family Ziphiidae (beaked whales)
  - Family Platanistidae (South Asian dolphins)
  - Superfamily Inioidea
    - Family Iniidae (boto)
    - Family Lipotidae (baji)
    - Family Pontoporiidae (franciscana)
  - Superfamily Delphinoidea
    - Family Monodontidae (narwhal and beluga)
    - Family Phocoenidae (porpoises)
    - Family Delphinidae (oceanic dolphins)

=== Evolution ===
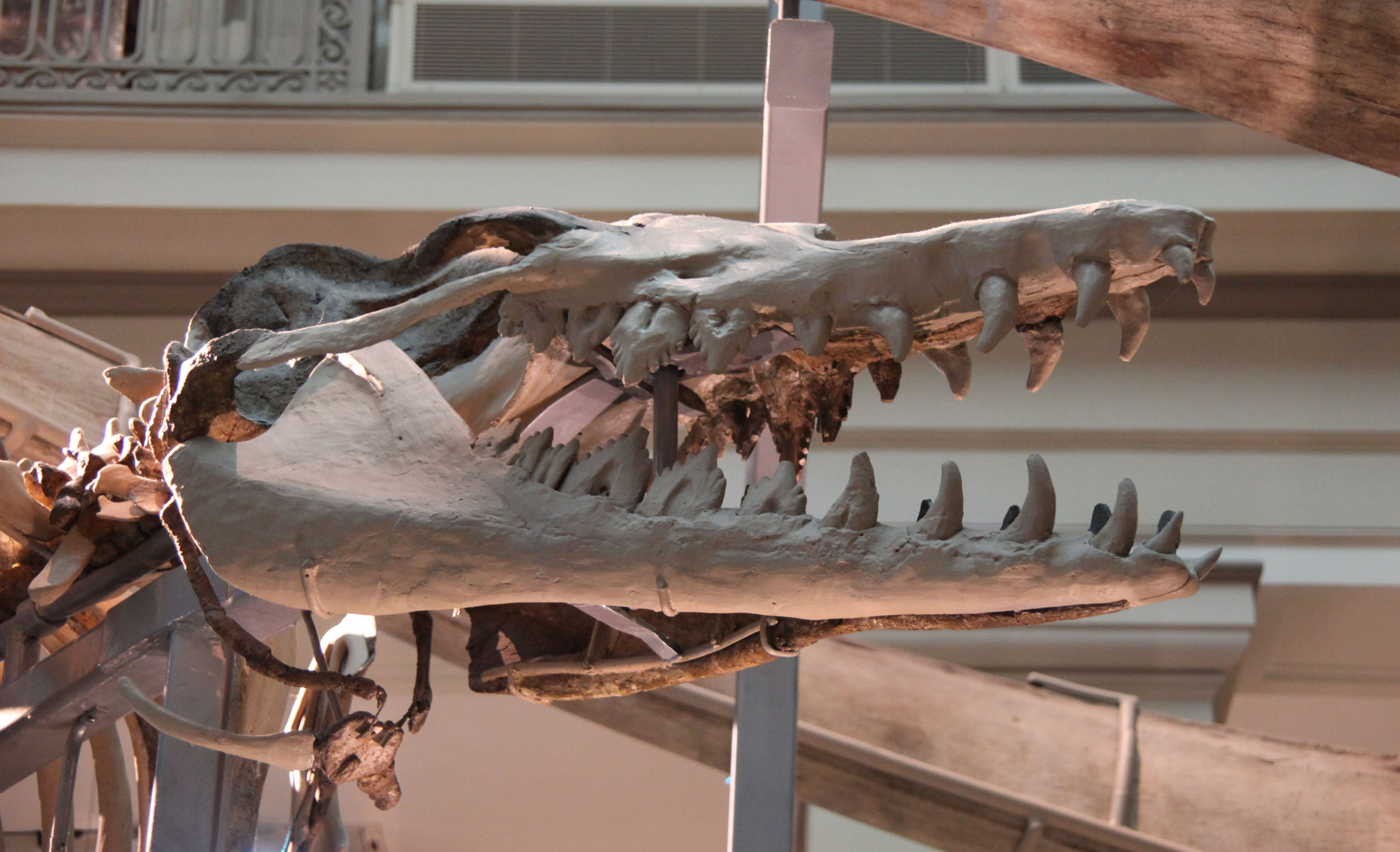
Basilosaurus cetoides, an archaeocete from late Eocene (41 to 34 million years ago), before the divergence of Odontocetes and Mysticetes.

Toothed whales and baleen whales both descend from a common ancestor among the archaeocetes, the early cetaceans and all form a monophyletic clade. The archaeocetes all had teeth and are descendants of land-dwelling even-toed ungulates (order Artiodactyla). The ancestors of modern toothed whales and baleen whales diverged in the early Oligocene, around 34 million years ago, coinciding with a major change in the climate of the southern oceans (opening of the Drake passage). These early odontocetes were likely characterized by the derived characters (synapomorphies) shared by all modern odontocetes and distinguishing odontocetes from mysticetes. The most significant of these synapomorphies relate to the sense of echolocation and include fused nasal passages, a fatty melon and a system of air sacks on the forehead, presence of certain wax-esters in the fatty tissues, fat-filled canal in the lower jaw, and modifications to the middle ear, including complete loss of the eardrum and ear canal.

Skulls of the odontocete Squalodon from Oligocene show first hypothesized evidence for echolocation. Squalodon featured several commonalities with modern Odontocetes, most striking the depression in front of the nasal passages, the location of the melon in modern odontocetes. The melon is unique to all odontocetes and is an essential part of the sound production apparatus for echolocation. The sperm whale do not have a melon as the rest of the odontocetes, but a structure referred to as the "junk" is likely homologous to the melon in other odontocetes, supported by the anatomy of sound producing structures in the dwarf and pygmy sperm whale, being an intermediary between sperm whales and all other modern odontocetes.

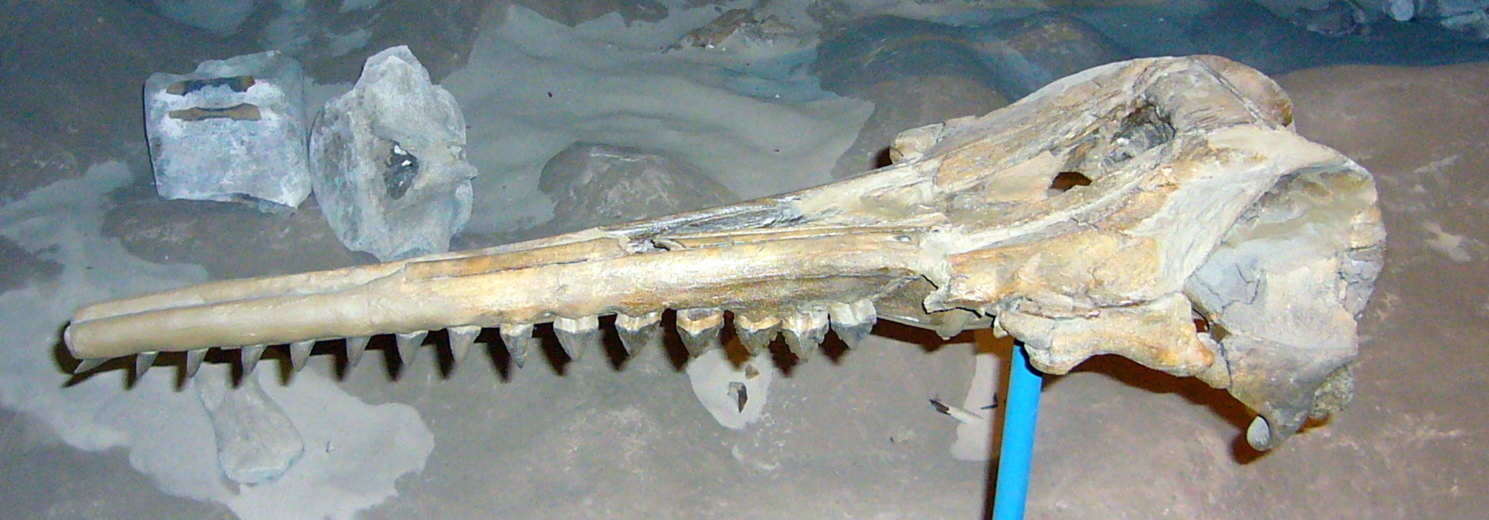
Skull of Squalodon calvertensis. Note the concave skull in front of the nasal passages, similar to modern odontocetes. In modern odontocetes (with exception of Physeteroids), this depression in the skull is where the melon is located.

== Biology ==
=== Anatomy ===
Anatomy of the bottlenose dolphin

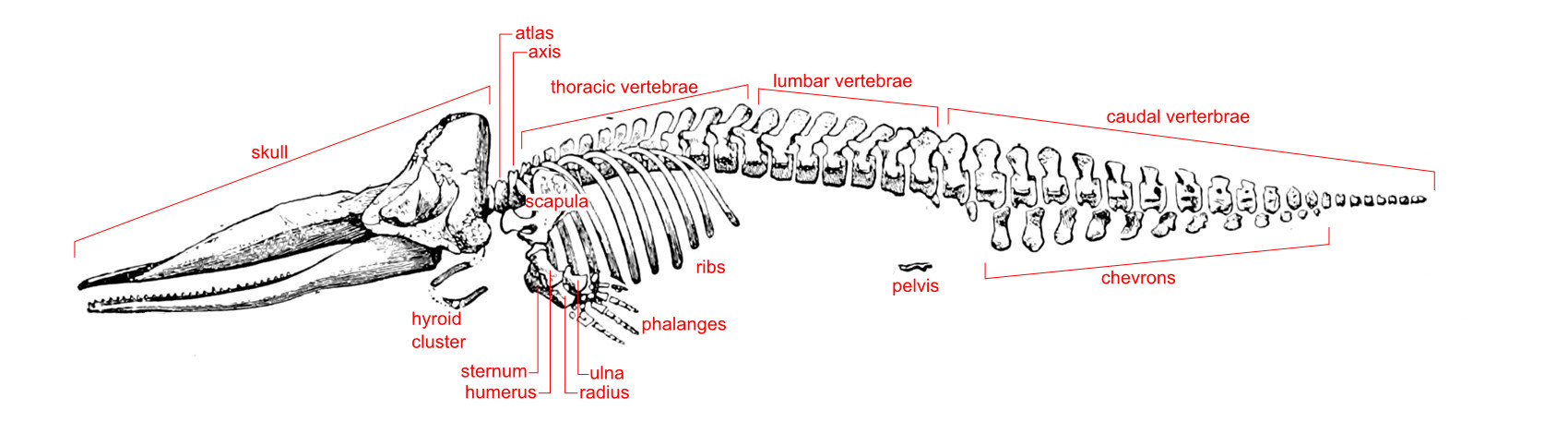
Features of a sperm whale skeleton

Toothed whales have torpedo-shaped bodies with usually inflexible necks, limbs modified into flippers, no outer ears, a large tail fin, and bulbous heads (with the exception of the sperm whale family). Their skulls have small eye orbits, long beaks (with the exception sperm whales), and eyes placed on the sides of their heads. Toothed whales range in size from the 4.5 ft (1.4 m) and 120 lb (54 kg) vaquita to the 20 m (66 ft) and 55 t (61-short-ton) sperm whale. Overall, they tend to be dwarfed by their relatives, the baleen whales (Mysticeti). Several species have sexual dimorphism, with the females being larger than the males. One exception is with the sperm whale, which has males larger than the females.

Odontocetes possess teeth with cementum cells overlying dentine cells. Unlike human teeth, which are composed mostly of enamel on the portion of the tooth outside of the gum, whale teeth have cementum outside the gum. Only in larger whales, where the cementum is worn away on the tip of the tooth, does enamel show. There is only a single set of functional teeth (monophyodont dentition). Except for the sperm whale, most toothed whales are smaller than the baleen whales. The teeth differ considerably among the species. They may be numerous, with some dolphins bearing over 100 teeth in their jaws. At the other extreme are the narwhals with their single long tusks and the almost toothless beaked whales with tusk-like teeth only in males. In most beaked whales the teeth are seen to erupt in the lower jaw, and primarily occurs at the males sexual maturity. Not all species are believed to use their teeth for feeding. For instance, the sperm whale likely uses its teeth for aggression and showmanship.

Breathing involves expelling stale air from their one blowhole, forming an upward, steamy spout, followed by inhaling fresh air into the lungs. Spout shapes differ among species, which facilitates identification. The spout only forms when warm air from the lungs meets cold air, so it does not form in warmer climates, as with river dolphins. One of the earlies descriptions of breathing and airways in a porpoise is from the British naturalist John Ray:

"The tube in the head, through which this kind fish takes its breath and spitting water, located in front of the brain and ends outwardly in a simple hole, but inside it is divided by a downward bony septum, as if it were two nostrils; but underneath it opens up again in the mouth in a void."

— John Ray, 1671

Almost all cetaceans have a thick layer of blubber, except for river dolphins. In species that live near the poles, the blubber can be as thick as 11 in (28 cm). This blubber can help with buoyancy, protection to some extent as predators would have a hard time getting through a thick layer of fat, energy for fasting during leaner times, and insulation from the harsh climate. Calves are born with only a thin layer of blubber, but some species compensate for this with thick lanugos.

Toothed whales have also evolved the ability to store large amounts of wax esters in their adipose tissue as an addition to or in complete replacement of other fats in their blubber. They can produce isovaleric acid from branched chain fatty acids (BCFA). These adaptations are unique, are only in more recent, derived lineages and were likely part of the transition for species to become deeper divers as the families of toothed whales (Physeteridae, Kogiidae, and Ziphiidae) that have the highest quantities of wax esters and BCFAs in their blubber are also the species that dive the deepest and for the longest amount of time.

Toothed whales have a two-chambered stomach similar in structure to terrestrial carnivores. They have fundic and pyloric chambers.

=== Locomotion ===
Short-beaked common dolphin pod swimming

Cetaceans have two flippers on the front, and a tail fin. These flippers contain four digits. Although toothed whales do not possess fully developed hind limbs, some, such as the sperm whale, possess discrete rudimentary appendages, which may contain feet and digits. Toothed whales are fast swimmers in comparison to seals, which typically cruise at 5–15 knots, or 9–28 km/h (5.6–17.4 mph); the sperm whale, in comparison, can travel at speeds of up to 35 km/h (22 mph). The fusing of the neck vertebrae, while increasing stability when swimming at high speeds, decreases flexibility, rendering them incapable of turning their heads; river dolphins, however, have unfused neck vertebrae and can turn their heads. When swimming, toothed whales rely on their tail fins to propel them through the water. Flipper movement is continuous. They swim by moving their tail fin and lower body up and down, propelling themselves through vertical movement, while their flippers are mainly used for steering. Some species log out of the water, which may allow them to travel faster. Their skeletal anatomy allows them to be fast swimmers. Most species have a dorsal fin.

Most toothed whales are adapted for diving to great depths, porpoises are one exception. In addition to their streamlined bodies, they can slow their heart rate to conserve oxygen; blood is rerouted from tissue tolerant of water pressure to the heart and brain among other organs; haemoglobin and myoglobin store oxygen in body tissue; and they have twice the concentration of myoglobin than haemoglobin. Before going on long dives, many toothed whales exhibit a behaviour known as sounding; they stay close to the surface for a series of short, shallow dives while building their oxygen reserves, and then make a sounding dive.

=== Senses ===
Biosonar by cetaceans

Toothed whale eyes are relatively small for their size, yet they retain a good degree of eyesight. Also, the eyes are on the sides of the head, so their vision consists of two fields, rather than a binocular view as humans have. When a beluga surfaces, its lenses and corneas correct the nearsightedness that results from the refraction of light; they contain both rod and cone cells, meaning they can see in both dim and bright light. They do, however, lack short wavelength-sensitive visual pigments in their cone cells, indicating a more limited capacity for colour vision than most mammals. Most toothed whales have slightly flattened eyeballs, enlarged pupils (which shrink as they surface to prevent damage), slightly flattened corneas, and a tapetum lucidum; these adaptations allow for large amounts of light to pass through the eye, and, therefore, a very clear image of the surrounding area. In water, a whale can see around 10.7 m (35 ft) ahead of itself, but they have a smaller range above water. They also have glands on the eyelids and outer corneal layer that act as protection for the cornea.

The olfactory lobes are absent in toothed whales, and unlike baleen whales, they lack the vomeronasal organ, suggesting they have no sense of smell.

Toothed whales are not thought to have a good sense of taste, as their taste buds are atrophied or missing altogether. However, some dolphins have preferences between different kinds of fish, indicating some sort of attachment to taste.

=== Echolocation ===
Diagram illustrating sound generation, propagation and reception in a toothed whale. Outgoing sounds are red and incoming ones are green

Toothed whales are capable of making a broad range of sounds using nasal airsacs located just below the blowhole. Clicks are directional and are used for echolocation, often occurring in a short series called a click train. The click rate increases when approaching an object of interest. Toothed whale biosonar clicks are amongst the loudest sounds made by marine animals. Toothed whales (Odontocetes) echolocate by creating a series of clicks emitted at various frequencies. Sound pulses are emitted through the melon-shaped forehead, reflected off objects, and retrieved through the lower jaw.

The cetacean ear has specific adaptations to the marine environment. In humans, the middle ear works as an impedance equalizer between the outside air's low impedance and the cochlear fluid's high impedance. In whales, and other marine mammals, no great difference exists between the outer and inner environments. Instead of sound passing through the outer ear to the middle ear, whales receive sound through the throat, from which it passes through a low-impedance, fat-filled cavity to the inner ear. The ear is acoustically isolated from the skull by air-filled sinus pockets, which allow for greater directional hearing underwater.

Odontocetes generate sounds independently of respiration using recycled air that passes through air sacs and phonic (alternatively monkey) lips. Integral to the lips are oil-filled organs called dorsal bursae that have been suggested to be homologous in the dolphin to the sperm whale's spermaceti organ. These send out high-frequency clicks through the sound-modifying organs of the extramandibular fat body, intramandibular fat body and the melon.

The melon consists of fat, and the skull of any such creature containing a melon will have a large depression. The melon size varies between species, the bigger it is, the more dependent they are on it. A beaked whale, for example, has a small bulge sitting on top of its skull, whereas a sperm whale's head is filled mainly with the melon. Directional asymmetry in the skull has been seen amongst many generations, used for echolocation. This asymmetry is useful in focusing the use of bio sonar effectively when deep diving for prey. Odontocetes are well adapted to hear sounds at ultrasonic frequencies, as opposed to mysticetes who generally hear sounds within the range of infrasonic frequencies.

=== Communication calls ===
Bottlenose dolphins have been found to have signature whistles unique to each individual. Dolphins use these whistles to communicate with one another by identifying an individual. It can be seen as the dolphin equivalent of a name for humans. Because dolphins generally live in groups, communication is necessary. Signal masking is when other similar sounds (conspecific sounds) interfere with the original sound. In larger groups, individual whistle sounds are less prominent. Dolphins tend to travel in pods, sometimes of up to 600 members.

== Life history and behaviour ==
=== Intelligence ===
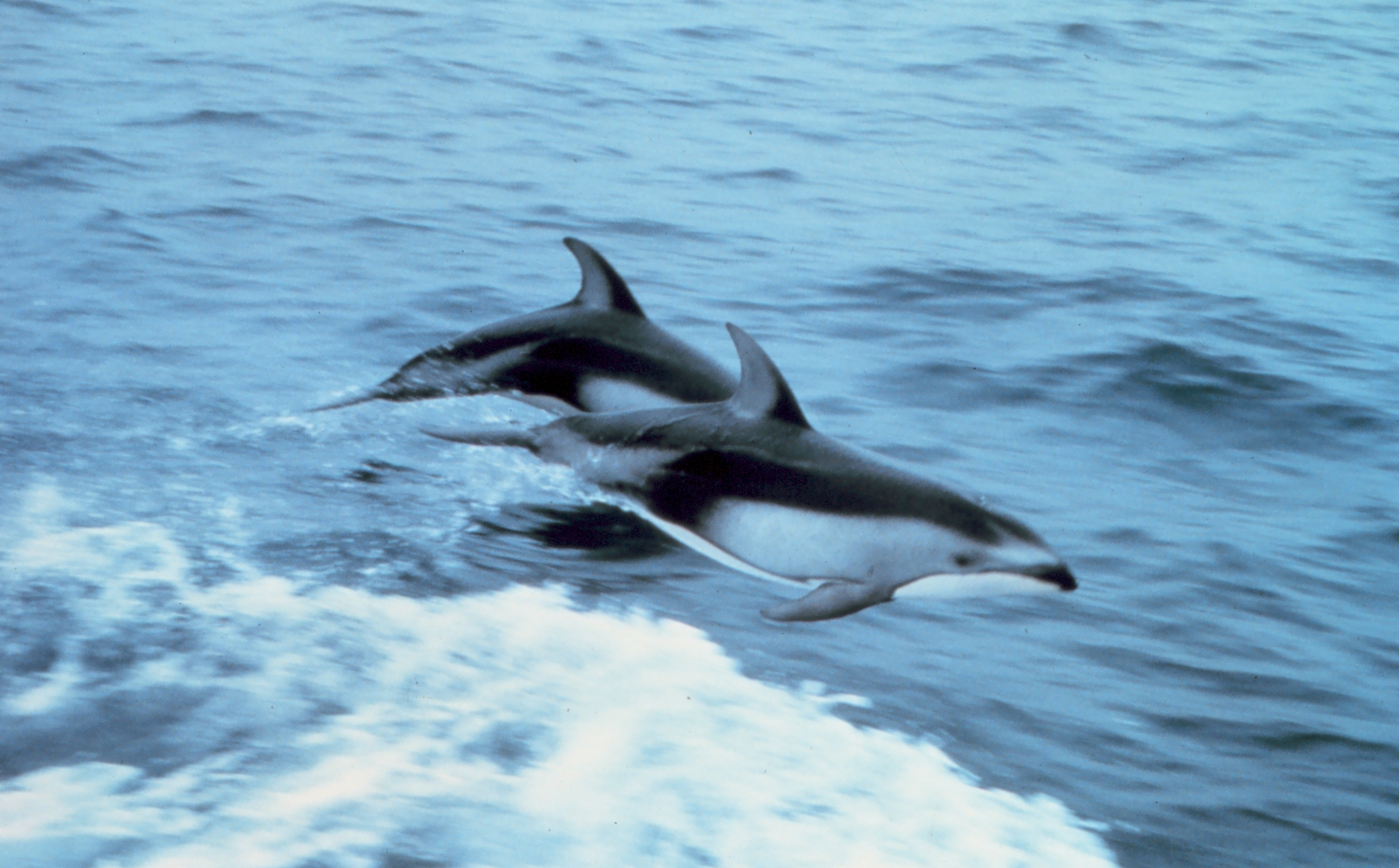
Pacific white-sided dolphins porpoising

Cetaceans are known to communicate and are able to teach, learn, cooperate, scheme, and grieve. The neocortex of many species of dolphins is home to elongated spindle neurons that, prior to 2007, were known only in hominids. In humans, these cells are involved in social conduct, emotions, judgement, and theory of mind. Dolphin spindle neurons are found in areas of the brain homologous to where they are found in humans, suggesting they perform a similar function.

Brain size was previously considered a major indicator of the intelligence of an animal. Since most of the brain is used for maintaining bodily functions, greater ratios of brain to body mass may increase the amount of brain mass available for more complex cognitive tasks. Allometric analysis indicates that mammalian brain size scales around the two-thirds or three-quarters exponent of the body mass. Comparison of a particular animal's brain size with the expected brain size based on such allometric analysis provides an encephalization quotient that can be used as another indication of animal intelligence. Sperm whales have the largest brain mass of any animal on earth, averaging 8,000 cm^{3} (490 in^{3}) and 7.8 kg (17 lb) in mature males, in comparison to the average human brain which averages 1,450 cm^{3} (88 in^{3}) in mature males. The brain to body mass ratio in some odontocetes, such as porpoises, is the third largest of all mammals, after treeshrews and then humans.

Researchers pushed a pole with a sponge attached along the substrate to simulate the sponging behavior by dolphins

Dolphins are known to engage in complex play behaviour, which includes such things as producing stable underwater toroidal air-core vortex rings or "bubble rings". Two main methods of bubble ring production are: rapid puffing of a burst of air into the water and allowing it to rise to the surface, forming a ring, or swimming repeatedly in a circle and then stopping to inject air into the helical vortex currents thus formed. They also appear to enjoy biting the vortex rings, so that they burst into many separate bubbles and then rise quickly to the surface. Dolphins are known to use this method during hunting. Dolphins are also known to use tools. In Shark Bay, a population of Indo-Pacific bottlenose dolphins put sponges on their beak to protect them from abrasions and sting ray barbs while foraging in the seafloor. This behaviour is passed on from mother to daughter, and it is only observed in 54 female individuals.

Self-awareness is seen, by some, to be a sign of highly developed, abstract thinking. Self-awareness, though not well-defined scientifically, is believed to be the precursor to more advanced processes like metacognitive reasoning (thinking about thinking) that are typical of humans. Research in this field has suggested that cetaceans, among others, possess self-awareness. The most widely used test for self-awareness in animals is the mirror test, in which a temporary dye is placed on an animal's body, and the animal is then presented with a mirror; then whether the animal shows signs of self-recognition is determined. In 1995, Marten and Psarakos used television to test dolphin self-awareness. They showed dolphins real-time footage of themselves, recorded footage, and another dolphin. They concluded that their evidence suggested self-awareness rather than social behavior. While this particular study has not been repeated since then, dolphins have since "passed" the mirror test.

=== Vocalisations ===
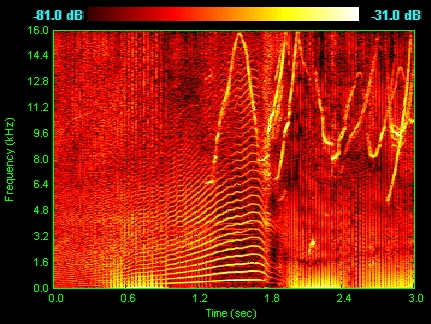
Spectrogram of dolphin vocalizations. Whistles, whines, and clicks are visible as upside down V's, horizontal striations, and vertical lines, respectively.

Dolphins make a broad range of sounds using nasal airsacs located just below the blowhole. Roughly three categories of sounds can be identified: frequency modulated whistles, burst-pulsed sounds and clicks. Dolphins communicate with whistle-like sounds produced by vibrating connective tissue, similar to the way human vocal cords function, and through burst-pulsed sounds, though the nature and extent of that ability is not known. The clicks are directional and are for echolocation, often occurring in a short series called a click train. The click rate increases when approaching an object of interest. Dolphin echolocation clicks are amongst the loudest sounds made by marine animals.

Bottlenose dolphins have been found to have signature whistles, a whistle that is unique to a specific individual. These whistles are used in order for dolphins to communicate with one another by identifying an individual. It can be seen as the dolphin equivalent of a name for humans. These signature whistles are developed during a dolphin's first year; it continues to maintain the same sound throughout its lifetime. An auditory experience influences the whistle development of each dolphin. Dolphins are able to communicate to one another by addressing another dolphin through mimicking their whistle. The signature whistle of a male bottlenose dolphin tends to be similar to that of his mother, while the signature whistle of a female bottlenose dolphin tends to be more identifying. Bottlenose dolphins have a strong memory when it comes to these signature whistles, as they are able to relate to a signature whistle of an individual they have not encountered for over twenty years. Research done on signature whistle usage by other dolphin species is relatively limited. The research on other species done so far has yielded varied outcomes and inconclusive results.

Sperm whales can produce three specific vocalisations: creaks, codas, and slow clicks. A creak is a rapid series of high-frequency clicks that sounds somewhat like a creaky door hinge. It is typically used when homing in on prey. A coda is a short pattern of 3 to 20 clicks that is used in social situations to identify one another (like a signature whistle), but it is still unknown whether sperm whales possess individually specific coda repertoires or whether individuals make codas at different rates. Slow clicks are heard only in the presence of males (it is not certain whether females occasionally make them). Males make a lot of slow clicks in breeding grounds (74% of the time), both near the surface and at depth, which suggests they are primarily mating signals. Outside breeding grounds, slow clicks are rarely heard, and usually near the surface.

Characteristics of sperm whale clicks
Click type	Apparent source level (dB re 1 μPa [Rms])	Directionality	Centroid frequency (kHz)	Inter-click interval (s)	Duration of click (ms)	Duration of pulse (ms)	Range audible to sperm whale (km)	Inferred function	Audio sample
Usual	230	High	15	0.5–1.0	15–30	0.1	16	Searching for prey	
Creak	205	High	15	0.005–0.1	0.1–5	0.1	6	Homing in on prey	
Coda	180	Low	5	0.1–0.5	35	0.5	~2	Social communication	
Slow	190	Low	0.5	5–8	30	5	60	Communication by males	

=== Foraging and predation ===
All whales are carnivorous and predatory. Odontocetes, as a whole, mostly feed on fish and cephalopods, and then followed by crustaceans and bivalves. All species are generalist and opportunistic feeders. Some may forage with other kinds of animals, such as other species of whales or certain species of pinnipeds. One common feeding method is herding, where a pod squeezes a school of fish into a small volume, known as a bait ball. Individual members then take turns plowing through the ball, feeding on the stunned fish. Coralling is a method where dolphins chase fish into shallow water to catch them more easily. Orcas and bottlenose dolphins have also been known to drive their prey onto a beach to feed on it, a behaviour known as beach or strand feeding. The shape of the snout may correlate with tooth number and thus feeding mechanisms. The narwhal, with its blunt snout and reduced dentition, relies on suction feeding.

Sperm whales usually dive between 300 and 800 metres (980 and 2,620 ft), and sometimes 1 to 2 kilometres (3,300 to 6,600 ft), in search of food. Such dives can last more than an hour. They feed on several species, notably the giant squid, but also the colossal squid, octopuses, and fish like demersal rays, but their diet is mainly medium-sized squid. Some prey may be taken accidentally while eating other items. A study in the Galápagos found that squid from the genera Histioteuthis (62%), Ancistrocheirus (16%), and Octopoteuthis (7%) weighing between 12 and 650 grams (0.026 and 1.433 lb) were the most commonly taken. Battles between sperm whales and giant squid or colossal squid have never been observed by humans; however, white scars are believed to be caused by the large squid. A 2010 study suggests that female sperm whales may collaborate when hunting Humboldt squid.

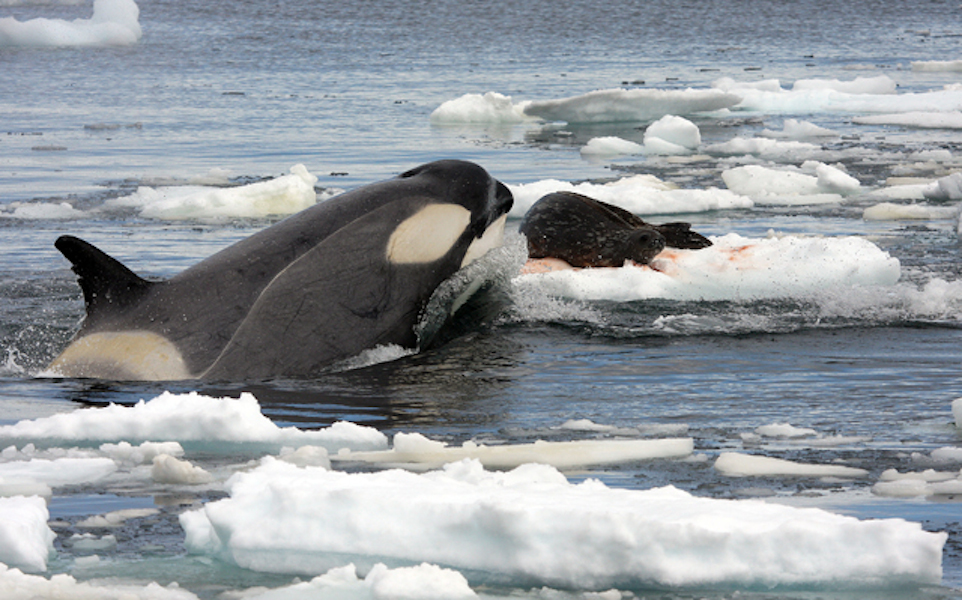
Orca hunting a Weddell seal

The orca is known to prey on numerous other toothed whale species. One example is the false killer whale. To subdue and kill whales, orcas continually ram them with their heads; this can sometimes kill bowhead whales, or severely injure them. Other times, they corral their prey before striking. They are typically hunted by groups of 10 or fewer orca, but they are seldom attacked by an individual. Calves are more commonly taken by orca, but adults can be targeted, as well. Groups even attack larger cetaceans such as minke whales, gray whales, and rarely sperm whales or blue whales. Other marine mammal prey species include nearly 20 species of seal, sea lion and fur seal.

These cetaceans are targeted by terrestrial and pagophilic predators. The polar bear is well-adapted for hunting Arctic whales and calves. Bears are known to use sit-and-wait tactics, as well as active stalking and pursuit of prey on ice or water. Whales lessen the chance of predation by gathering in groups. This, however, means less room around the breathing hole as the ice slowly closes the gap. When out at sea, whales dive out of the reach of surface-hunting orca. Polar bear attacks on belugas and narwhals are usually successful in winter, but rarely inflict any damage in summer.

For most of the smaller species of dolphins, only a few of the larger sharks, such as the bull shark, dusky shark, tiger shark, and great white shark, are a potential risk, especially for calves. Dolphins can tolerate and recover from extreme injuries (including shark bites) although the exact methods used to achieve this are not known. The healing process is rapid and even very deep wounds do not cause dolphins to hemorrhage to death. Even gaping wounds restore in such a way that the animal's body shape is restored, and infection of such large wounds are rare.

=== Life cycle ===
Toothed whales are fully aquatic creatures, which means their birth and courtship behaviours are very different from terrestrial and semiaquatic creatures. Since they are unable to go onto land to calve, they deliver their young with the fetus positioned for tail-first delivery. This prevents the calf from drowning either upon or during delivery. To feed the newborn, toothed whales, being aquatic, must squirt the milk into the mouth of the calf. Being mammals, they have mammary glands used for nursing calves; they are weaned around 11 months of age. This milk contains high amounts of fat which is meant to hasten the development of blubber; it contains so much fat, it has the consistency of toothpaste. Females deliver a single calf, with gestation lasting about a year, dependency until one to two years, and maturity around seven to 10 years, all varying between the species. This mode of reproduction produces few offspring, but increases the survival probability of each one. Females, referred to as "cows", carry the responsibility of childcare, as males, referred to as "bulls", play no part in raising calves.

In orcas, false killer whales, short-finned pilot whales, narwhals, and belugas, there is an unusually long post-reproductive lifespan (menopause) in females. Older females, though unable to have their own children, play a key role in the rearing of other calves in the pod, and in this sense, given the costs of pregnancy especially at an advanced age, extended menopause is advantageous.

== Interaction with humans ==
=== Threats ===
==== Sperm whaling ====
The nose of the whale is filled with a waxy substance that was widely used in candles, oil lamps, and lubricants

The head of the sperm whale is filled with a waxy liquid called spermaceti. This liquid can be refined into spermaceti wax and sperm oil. These were much sought after by 18th-, 19th-, and 20th-century whalers. These substances found a variety of commercial applications, such as candles, soap, cosmetics, machine oil, other specialized lubricants, lamp oil, pencils, crayons, leather waterproofing, rustproofing materials, and many pharmaceutical compounds. Ambergris, a solid, waxy, flammable substance produced in the digestive system of sperm whales, was also sought as a fixative in perfumery.

Sperm whaling in the 18th century began with small sloops carrying only a pair of whaleboats (sometimes only one). As the scope and size of the fleet increased, so did the rig of the vessels change, as brigs, schooners, and finally ships and barks were introduced. In the 19th-century stubby, square-rigged ships (and later barks) dominated the fleet, being sent to the Pacific (the first being the British whaleship Emilia, in 1788), the Indian Ocean (1780s), and as far away as the Japan grounds (1820) and the coast of Arabia (1820s), as well as Australia (1790s) and New Zealand (1790s).

A sperm whale is killed and stripped of its blubber and spermaceti

Hunting for sperm whales during this period was notoriously dangerous for the crews of the 19th-century whaleboats. Though a properly harpooned sperm whale generally exhibited a fairly consistent pattern of trying to flee underwater to the point of exhaustion (at which point it would surface and offer no further resistance), it was not uncommon for bull whales to become enraged and turn to attack pursuing whaleboats on the surface, particularly if it had already been wounded by repeated harpooning attempts. A commonly reported tactic was for the whale to invert itself and violently thrash the surface of the water with its fluke, flipping and crushing nearby boats.

The estimated historic worldwide sperm whale population numbered 1,100,000 before commercial sperm whaling began in the early 18th century. By 1880, it had declined an estimated 29%. From that date until 1946, the population appears to have recovered somewhat as whaling pressure lessened, but after the Second World War, with the industry's focus again on sperm whales, the population declined even further to only 33%. In the 19th century, between 184,000 and 236,000 sperm whales were estimated to have been killed by the various whaling nations, while in the modern era, at least 770,000 were taken, most between 1946 and 1980. Remaining sperm whale populations are large enough so that the species' conservation status is vulnerable, rather than endangered. However, the recovery from the whaling years is a slow process, particularly in the South Pacific, where the toll on males of breeding age was severe.

==== Drive hunting ====
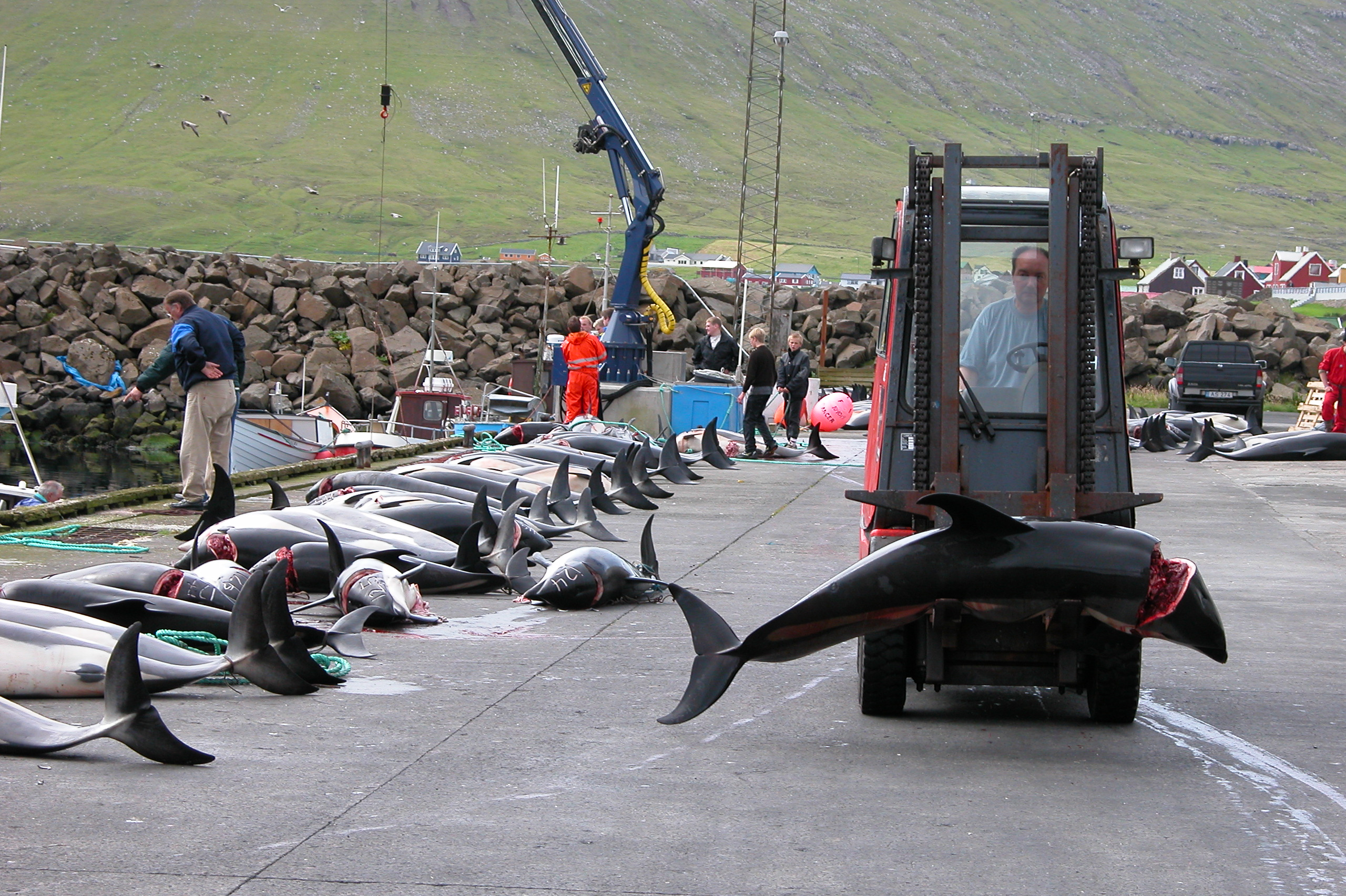
Atlantic white-sided dolphin caught in a drive hunt in Hvalba on the Faroe Islands being taken away with a forklift

Dolphins and porpoises are hunted in an activity known as dolphin drive hunting. This is done by driving a pod together with boats and usually into a bay or onto a beach. Their escape is prevented by closing off the route to the ocean with other boats or nets. Dolphins are hunted this way in several places around the world, including the Solomon Islands, the Faroe Islands, Peru, and Japan, the most well-known practitioner of this method. By numbers, dolphins are mostly hunted for their meat, though some end up in dolphinariums. Despite the controversial nature of the hunt resulting in international criticism, and the possible health risk that the often polluted meat causes, thousands of dolphins are caught in drive hunts each year.

In Japan, the hunting is done by a select group of fishermen. When a pod of dolphins has been spotted, they are driven into a bay by the fishermen while banging on metal rods in the water to scare and confuse the dolphins. When the dolphins are in the bay, it is quickly closed off with nets so the dolphins cannot escape. The dolphins are usually not caught and killed immediately, but instead left to calm down over night. The following day, the dolphins are caught one by one and killed. The killing of the animals used to be done by slitting their throats, but the Japanese government banned this method, and now dolphins may officially only be killed by driving a metal pin into the neck of the dolphin, which causes them to die within seconds according to a memo from Senzo Uchida, the executive secretary of the Japan Cetacean Conference on Zoological Gardens and Aquariums. A veterinary team's analysis of a 2011 video footage of Japanese hunters killing striped dolphins using this method suggested that, in one case, death took over four minutes.

Since much of the criticism is the result of photos and videos taken during the hunt and slaughter, it is now common for the final capture and slaughter to take place on site inside a tent or under a plastic cover, out of sight from the public. The most circulated footage is probably that of the drive and subsequent capture and slaughter process taken in Futo, Japan, in October 1999, shot by the Japanese animal welfare organization Elsa Nature Conservancy. Part of this footage was, amongst others, shown on CNN. In recent years, the video has also become widespread on the internet and was featured in the animal welfare documentary Earthlings, though the method of killing dolphins as shown in this video is now officially banned. In 2009, a critical documentary on the hunts in Japan titled The Cove was released and shown amongst others at the Sundance Film Festival.

==== Other threats ====
Toothed whales can also be threatened by humans more indirectly. They are unintentionally caught in fishing nets by commercial fisheries as bycatch and accidentally swallow fishhooks. Gillnetting and Seine netting are significant causes of mortality in cetaceans and other marine mammals. Porpoises are commonly entangled in fishing nets. Whales are also affected by marine pollution. High levels of organic chemicals accumulate in these animals since they are high in the food chain. They have large reserves of blubber, more so for toothed whales, as they are higher up the food chain than baleen whales. Lactating mothers can pass the toxins on to their young. These pollutants can cause gastrointestinal cancer and greater vulnerability to infectious diseases. They may also swallow litter, such as plastic bags. Pollution of the Yangtze river has led to the extinction of the baiji. Environmentalists speculate that advanced naval sonar endangers some whales. Some scientists suggest that sonar may trigger whale beachings, and they point to signs that such whales have experienced decompression sickness.

=== Conservation ===
Currently, no international convention gives universal coverage to all small whales, although the International Whaling Commission has attempted to extend its jurisdiction over them. ASCOBANS was negotiated to protect all small whales in the North and Baltic Seas and in the northeast Atlantic. ACCOBAMS protects all whales in the Mediterranean and Black Seas. The global UNEP Convention on Migratory Species currently covers seven toothed whale species or populations on its Appendix I, and 37 species or populations on Appendix II. All oceanic cetaceans are listed in CITES appendices, meaning international trade in them and products derived from them is very limited.

Many organizations are dedicated to protecting certain species that do not fall under any international treaty, such as CIRVA (Committee for the Recovery of the Vaquita), and the Wuhan Institute of Hydrobiology (for the Yangtze finless porpoise).

At the 2012 meeting of the American Association for the Advancement of Science, support was reiterated for a cetacean bill of rights, listing cetaceans as nonhuman persons.

=== In captivity ===
==== Species ====
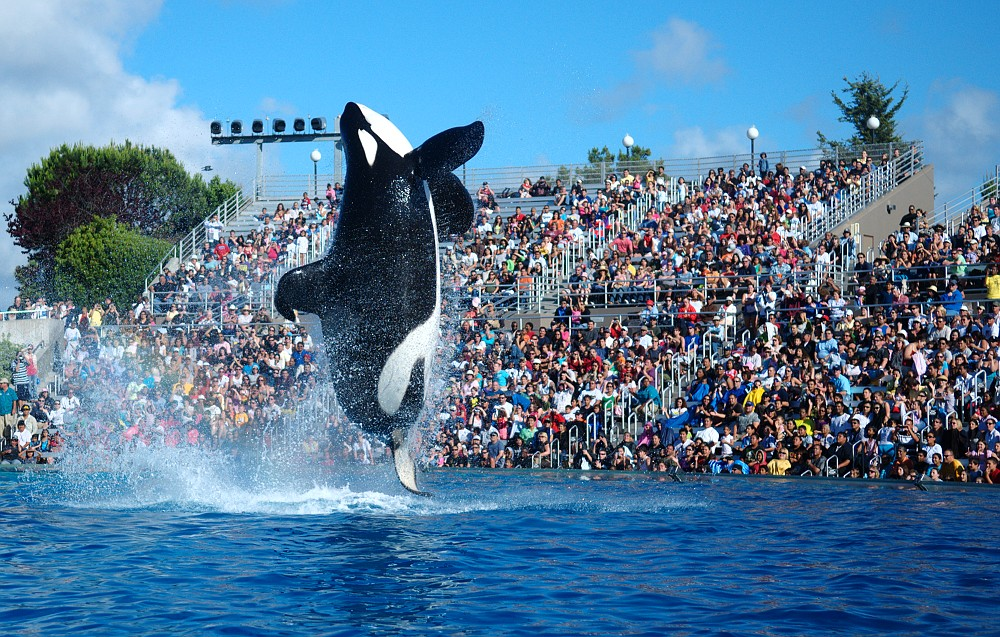
An orca by the name of Ulises performing at SeaWorld, 2009

Various species of toothed whales, mainly dolphins, are kept in captivity, as well as several other species of porpoise such as harbour porpoises and finless porpoises. These small cetaceans are more often than not kept in theme parks, such as SeaWorld, commonly known as a dolphinarium. Bottlenose dolphins are the most common species kept in dolphinariums, as they are relatively easy to train, have a long lifespan in captivity, and have a friendly appearance. Hundreds if not thousands of bottlenose dolphins live in captivity across the world, though exact numbers are hard to determine. Orca are well known for their performances in shows, but the number kept in captivity is very small, especially when compared to the number of bottlenose dolphins, with only 44 captives being held in aquaria as of 2012. Other species kept in captivity are spotted dolphins, false killer whales, and common dolphins, Commerson's dolphins, as well as rough-toothed dolphins, but all in much lower numbers than the bottlenose dolphin. Also, fewer than ten pilot whales, Amazon river dolphins, Risso's dolphins, spinner dolphins, or tucuxi are in captivity. Two unusual and very rare hybrid dolphins, known as wolphins, are kept at the Sea Life Park in Hawaii, which is a cross between a bottlenose dolphin and a false killer whale. Also, two common/bottlenose hybrids reside in captivity: one at Discovery Cove and the other at SeaWorld San Diego.

==== Controversy ====
Organizations such as the Animal Welfare Institute and Whale and Dolphin Conservation campaign against the captivity of dolphins and orcas. SeaWorld faced intensified criticism after the documentary Blackfish was released in 2013.

Aggression among captive orca is common. In August 1989, a dominant female orca, Kandu V, tried to rake a newcomer whale, Corky II, with her mouth during a live show, and smashed her head into a wall. Kandu V broke her jaw, which severed an artery, and then bled to death. In November 2006, a dominant female killer whale, Kasatka, repeatedly dragged experienced trainer Ken Peters to the bottom of the stadium pool during a show after hearing her calf crying for her in the back pools. In February 2010, an experienced female trainer at SeaWorld Orlando, Dawn Brancheau, was killed by orca Tilikum shortly after a show in Shamu Stadium. Tilikum had been associated with the deaths of two people previously. In May 2012, Occupational Safety and Health Administration administrative law judge Ken Welsch cited SeaWorld for two violations in the death of Dawn Brancheau and fined the company a total of US$12,000. Trainers were banned from making close contact with the orca. In April 2014, the US Court of Appeals for the District of Columbia denied an appeal by SeaWorld.

In 2013, SeaWorld's treatment of orca in captivity was the basis of the movie Blackfish, which documents the history of Tilikum, an orca captured by SeaLand of the Pacific, later transported to SeaWorld Orlando, which has been involved in the deaths of three people. In the aftermath of the release of the film, Martina McBride, 38 Special, REO Speedwagon, Cheap Trick, Heart, Trisha Yearwood, and Willie Nelson cancelled scheduled concerts at SeaWorld parks. SeaWorld disputes the accuracy of the film, and in December 2013 released an ad countering the allegations and emphasizing its contributions to the study of cetaceans and their conservation.
