= Commerce (1800 ship) =

British merchant, slave, and privateer ship (1800–1813)

History

Great Britain
- Name: Unknown
- Launched: 1798, France
- Acquired: 1800 by purchase of a prize
- Renamed: Commerce
- Fate: Wrecked November 1813

General characteristics
- Tons burthen: 135, or 136 (bm)
- Complement: 1801:20; 1803:25; 1803:55; 1804:35; 1807:25; 1807:27
- Armament: 1801:16 × 6&9-pounder guns; 1803:14 × 6-pounder guns; 1803:16 × 6&9-pounder guns; 1804:16 × 6&12-pounder guns; 1807:14 × 6-pounder guns; 1807:16 × 6&9-pounder guns; 1813: 6 × 4-pounder guns; 1815: 2 × 6-pounder guns + 4 × 9-pounder carronades

Commerce was a French vessel launched in 1798 and taken in prize in 1800. Initially she sailed as a West Indiaman. Then between 1801 and the end in 1807 of British participation in the triangular trade in enslaved people, Commerce made four voyages as a slave ship and also spent some time in 1803 cruising as a privateer. Afterwards, she continued to trade between Liverpool and West Africa. During one voyage in 1811 a French privateer captured her, but Commerce was recaptured. She was wrecked in November 1813 while returning to Liverpool from South America.

== Career ==
Commerce first appeared in Lloyd's Register (LR) in 1801. Lloyd's List's ship arrival and departure data had her returning to England from Martinique in April 1801.

Year	Master	Owner	Trade	Source
1801	Proctor	Benion & Co.	Lancaster–Barbados	LR
1802	W.Proctor; M'Levan	Benson & Co. Mullean (Mullion)	Lancaster–Barbados	LR

After a change in ownership, Commerce became a Liverpool-based slave ship.

1st voyage transporting enslaved people (1801–1802): Captain John McLeeven acquired a letter of marque 16 May 1801. He sailed from Liverpool on 21 June 1801. In 1801, 147 vessels sailed from English ports, bound for the trade in enslaved people; 122 of these vessels sailed from Liverpool.

Commerce acquired her captives at the Congo River and arrived at Trinidad on 25 December. She sailed from Trinidad on 12 February 1802, and arrived back at Liverpool on 9 April. She had left Liverpool with 27 crew members and had suffered 11 crew deaths on her voyage.

2nd voyage transporting enslaved people (1802–1803): Captain McLeeven sailed from Liverpool on 19 May 1802, bound for West Africa. In 1802, 155 vessels sailed from English ports, bound for the trade in enslaved people; 122 of these vessels sailed from Liverpool.

Commerce arrived at St Kitts on 9 December with 180 captives. In February 1803 Lloyd's List reported that Commerce, M'Nevin, master, had arrived at St Kitts from Africa and had sold there. Commerce sailed from St Kitts on 10 April and arrived back at Liverpool on 26 May 1803. At some point Edward Bowes replaced McLeveen as master. She had left Liverpool with 22 crew members and had suffered three crew deaths on her voyage.

Privateering (1803–1804?): War with France had resumed in early 1803 and Commerce's new owners committed her to privateering. Captain John Towers acquired a letter of marque on 13 June. In September Lloyd's List reported that Sparrow, Fawcett, master, had been taken, retaken by Commerce, M'Leeven, master, and brought into Lerwick. Lloyd's List's ship arrival and departure data noted that on 3 October Commerce, Towers, master, returned to Liverpool from a cruise. Captain Henry Atkinson acquired a letter of marque 13 October 1803, and the size of her crew doubled, giving her the capability of putting prize crews aboard any prizes she would take. There are no readily available reports of her meeting with any success.

Lloyd's Register did not reflect the changes in masters and trade in 1803.

Year	Master	Owner	Trade	Source
1804	McLevan; Woodstock	Mulleans; Dwaynes (Devaynes)	Liverpool–Africa	LR

3rd voyage transporting enslaved people (1804–1805): Captain James Woodstock acquired a letter of marque on 28 July 1804. He sailed from Liverpool on 19 August 1804. In 1804, 147 vessels sailed from English ports, bound for the trade in enslaved people; 126 of these vessels sailed from Liverpool.

Commerce acquired captives at Popo (possibly either Little Popo or Grand Popo). She arrived at Demerara on 18 April 1805 with 177 captives. She arrived back at Liverpool on 17 October. She had left Liverpool with 35 crew members and she had suffered 11 crew deaths on her voyage. She brought back 260 pieces of ivory, 20 hogsheads of sugar, and 20 bales of cotton.

4th voyage transporting enslaved people (1807–1808): Captain James Cunningham acquired a letter of marque on 2 April 1807, and Captain James Willy acquired a letter of marque 11 August 1807. Commerce sailed from Liverpool on 6 July. The Act for the abolition of the slave trade had passed Parliament in March 1807 and took effect on 1 May 1807. However, Commerce apparently had received clearance to sail before the deadline. Thus, when she sailed on 6 July, she did so legally. (Note: The last legal slave voyage for an English vessel was that of Kitty's Amelia, which sailed on 27 July.)

Commerce, Willey, master, was reported to have arrived at Sierra Leone in August. She was reported to have passed Barbados on 2 February 1808, bound for St Vincent's. She arrived at Grenada on 17 February 1808, and sold her captives there. A second report had Commerce, Cunningham, master, having arrived at St Vincent's and selling there. Commerce, Willey, master, left Grenada on 12 April, and arrived back at Liverpool on 17 June. She had left Liverpool with 27 crew members and she had three crew deaths on her voyage. She brought back 674 "elephant teeth" (ivory tusks), 16 tons of camwood, 10 tons of gum copal, and 13 tons of pepper.

Year	Master	Owner	Trade	Source & notes
1809	Woodstock; Willey	Devaynes	Liverpool–Africa	LR; large repair 1808
1810	J.Willey; Webster	Devaynes	Liverpool–Africa	LR; large repair 1808

A French privateer captured Commerce on 11 February 1811 at 47°47′N 16°0′W as Commerce was returning to Liverpool from the Guinea coast. The French put a prize master and a ten-man prize crew on Commerce. They left three men of her original complement on board, a lieutenant of the Royal Marines who had been sailing as a passenger, and two seamen. The next day the three British men were able to recapture Commerce; they then sailed her to Kinsale.

Year	Master	Owner	Trade	Source
1812	T.Webster; J.Hogworth	Devaynes; Evans	Liverpool–Africa; Malta	LR; large repair 1808
1813	J.Hogworth; W.Blue	Evans & Co.	Liverpool–Malta	LR; large repair 1808 & raised 1812
1814	W.Blue	Evans & Co.	Liverpool–Brazil	LR; large repair 1808 & raised 1812

== Fate ==
Lloyd's List reported in 1813 that Commerce, Blew, master, had sailed from Liverpool, via Cork, and arrived at Buenos Aires. Then in November Lloyd's List reported that Commerce, Blew, master had struck on the Carnavon Bay as she was returning to Liverpool from Buenos Aires. Her crew were saved and it was expected that part of the cargo would too be saved.
