= Trelawney (ship) =

Several ships have been named Trelawney or Trelawny.

== Sailing ships ==
- HMS Trelawney was the mercantile Trelawney that the Admiralty purchased in 1744 for use as a storeship and sold in 1747.
- Harpooner was launched at Liverpool in 1771. In 1778 she became a privateer. She captured at least two French merchantmen before a French privateer captured her in January 1780. She became the French privateer Comptesse of Buzanisis, which the Royal Navy recaptured. Harpooner returned to online records in 1782, and in 1783 became the slave ship Trelawney, which then made two complete voyages in the triangular trade in enslaved people. She was no longer listed after 1786.

=== Trelawney (1779 ship) ===
- Trelawney was launched in 1775 at Liverpool as Clayton, sailing as a West Indiaman. She first appeared as Trelawney in 1779. Between early 1788 and end-1790 she made two voyages as a whaler in the northern whale fishery, and one in the southern whale fishery. She disappeared from the registers between 1794 and 1800. In 1800 she reappeared as a coaster, sailing between the River Tyne and London. In 1809 she started sailing across the North Atlantic to Halifax, Nova Scotia, and Quebec. A United States privateer captured her in 1812.

=== Trelawney (1781 ship) ===
- Trelawney (1781 ship) was launched at Bristol in 1781. Initially she was a West Indiaman. In 1791 she made one voyage as a slave ship in the triangular trade in enslaved people during which her captives rebelled and seized control of the ship before men from another slave ship succeeded in recapturing her. She then made one voyage as a whaler in the British southern whale fishery. She was sold to Liverpool and then made two more voyages as a slave ship. She was damaged outbound on a fourth slave trading voyage and then disappears from online records.

=== Trelawney (1783 ship) ===
- Trelawney (1783 ship) was launched in 1783 in Liverpool as a West Indiaman. In 1800 a French privateer captured her as Trelawney was sailing to the Mediterranean, but the Royal Navy quickly recaptured her. The ship then traded with North America until she was wrecked on 19 February 1803.

=== Trelawney (1792 ship) ===
- Trelawney, of 370, or 373, or 376 tons, (bm) was a ship launched at Bristol in 1792 as a West Indiaman. She first appeared in Lloyd's Register (LR) in 1792. Trelawney, Moon, master, was wrecked in December 1806 on the Ness Sands, in the Bristol Channel, with the loss of her captain. She was on a voyage from Bristol to Jamaica. A falling mast killed the captain; eleven crew members and passengers drowned. The mate, pilot, and 15 to 20 others survived by taking to the ship's boats. (Note: Trelawney is sometimes confused with Trelawney (1781 ship), also of Bristol and of a similar burthen.)

=== Other ===
- Trelawney (1808 ship) was launched in 1808 at Whitehaven as a West Indiaman. She was wrecked in 1822.
- Trelawney (1809 ship) was launched in 1809 at Whitby as a West Indiaman. She was wrecked on 22 January 1819.
- Trelawney (1819 ship) was launched at Greenock in 1819. She disappeared in 1826.

== Steam ships ==
- SS Trelawny, of 1,656 GRT, a cargo ship launched in 1888 at South Shields. Sank on 25 August 1916 after a German submarine (possibly SM U-38) captured and torpedoed her.
- SS Trelawny, of 3,577 GRT, a collier launched in 1907 at South Shields that sank in 1926 after colliding with Gaelic Prince. For four months in late 1918 she served in the Royal Fleet Auxiliary with pennant Y3.278 as a stores carrier.
- SS Trelawny, of 4,689 GRT, a cargo ship launched in 1927 on the River Tyne that the German battleship Gneisenau sank on 22 February 1941 by gunfire.
