= Trelawney (1781 ship) =

British merchant, whaling, and slave ship (1781–1803)

History

Great Britain
- Name: Trelawney
- Owner: 1781:Robert, John, and Peter Gordon; 1791:James Rogers & Co.; 1793: James Jones and William Bush; 1798: John Michael Wagner, George Browne, Morris Lewin Mozley, Thomas Moore, Abraham Joseph, and Michael Cullen; 1800: William & Henry Byrom, and John Smith
- Launched: 1781, Bristol
- Fate: Damaged 1803 and probably condemned thereafter

General characteristics
- Tons burthen: 295, or 319, or 333, or 350 (bm)
- Complement: 1782: 50; 1798: 20; 1800: 25
- Armament: 1782: 20 × 9-pounder guns + 6 swivel guns; 1798: 20 × 9&12-pounder cannons; 1800: 20 × 9&12-pounder cannons; 1801: 18 × 9-pounder guns + 4 × 12-pounder carronades

Trelawney or Trelawny was a ship launched at Bristol in 1781. Initially she was a West Indiaman. In 1791 she made one voyage as a slave ship in the triangular trade in enslaved people. She then made one voyage as a whaler in the British southern whale fishery. She was sold to Liverpool and made two more voyages as a slave ship. She was damaged outbound on a fourth voyage to transport enslaved people and then disappears from online records.

== Career ==
Trelawny first appeared in Lloyd's Register (LR) in 1781.

Year	Master	Owner	Trade	Source
1781	J.Neilson	P.Gordon	Bristol–Jamaica	LR
1782	J.Neilson; William Sherry	P.Gordon	Bristol–Jamaica	LR

Captain William Sherry acquired a letter of marque on 11 September 1782.

Year	Master	Owner	Trade	Source
1786	E.Power	P.Gordon	Bristol–Jamaica	LR
1791	E.Power; Thomas King	P.Gordon; J.Rogers & Co.	Bristol–Jamaica; Bristol Africa	LR

1st voyage transporting enslaved people (1791–1792): Michael Crangle was initially listed as her captain. (Note: Crangle died on 29 January 1793 of a fever while on the coast of Africa as captain of Favourite.) Trelawney, sailed from Bristol on 28 July 1791, bound for West Africa. Trelawney, King, master acquired captives at Bonny and arrived at Montego Bay, Jamaica on 28 April 1792. She had embarked 333 captives and she arrived with 313, for a 6% loss rate. She had left Bristol with 35 crew members and had arrived at Jamaica with 30. She discharged eight crew while at Montego Bay, and enlisted three shortly before sailing. She sailed for England on 20 May and arrived back at Bristol on 21 July with 25 crew members.

Year	Master	Owner	Trade	Source
1793	Thomas King; R.Hilman	J.Rogers & Co. J.Jones	Bristol–Africa	LR

Whaling voyage (1793–1796): Captain Robert Hillman (or Hilman) sailed from Bristol in 1793, bound for Peru. Trelawney was recorded as visiting Saint Helena in 1794. In July 1795 Trelawney was at Valparaiso, and on the coast of Peru in December 1795 with 170 tons of sperm oil. She arrived back at Bristol on 16 December 1796. (Note: Robert Hillman (1747-1824), of Nantucket, was reportedly captain of Hannah when she smuggled tea from London to Martha's Vineyard after the passage of the Stamp Act 1765.)

Trelawney disappeared from Lloyd's Register between 1798 and 1800, with her data to 1798 not having been changed from that of 1793. She may have been sold and have assumed another name as she does not appear in Lloyd's List's ship arrival and departure data for 1797 and 1798, though there is no obvious candidate in Lloyd's Register for 1798. At some point she apparently was sold to Liverpool.

2nd voyage transporting enslaved people (1799–1800): Captain James Lake acquired a letter of marque on 23 October 1798. He sailed from Liverpool on 29 October. In 1799, 156 vessels sailed from English ports, bound for the trade in enslaved people; 134 of these vessels sailed from Liverpool.

In June 1799, Lake started acquiring captives at Malembo. In the morning of 2 August the 85 captives aboard Trelawney rose up against their captors. They wounded two sailors; the rest escaped in the boats and made their way to another ship, Lord Nelson, which was anchored nearby. Lake and his crew left Trelawney in the rebels' hands. Captain Kendall of Lord Nelson started firing on Trelawney and sent his men to retake her. The men from Lord Nelson succeeded in subduing the uprising. Kendall then went aboard Trelawney, forcing Lake and his crew to come with him. In 1802 Kendall sued Trelawney's owners for salvage. The judge of the High Court of Admiralty awarded the plaintiff 10% of the estimated value of Trelawney, her cargo, and freight, approximately £10,000, plus the salvor's expenses. The award was less than would be awarded by application of the Prize Act, as the judge ruled that under the circumstances the two vessels had a duty of mutual assistance.

Trelawney arrived at Kingston, Jamaica on 21 February 1800 with 190 captives. She left for England on 29 May. Lake died on 31 May. Trelawney, late Lake, arrived back at Liverpool on 15 July. Captain John Towns Powell had replaced Lake. She had left Liverpool with 41 crew members and had suffered 10 crew deaths on her voyage.

The Trelawney of this article returned to Lloyd's Register in the issue for 1800. She also appeared in the Register of Shipping (RS), which first published in 1800.

Year	Master	Owner	Trade	Source
1800	J.Smith	T.Smith	Liverpool–Africa	LR
1800	J.Lake	T.Parr & Co.	Liverpool–Africa	RS

3rd voyage transporting enslaved people (1800–1801): Captain Thomas Smith acquired a letter of marque on 28 August 1800. He sailed from Liverpool on 6 October 1800. In 1800, 133 vessels sailed from English ports, bound for the trade in enslaved people; 120 of these vessels sailed from Liverpool.

Smith acquired captives at Calabar. Trelawney, Smith, master, arrived at Kingston, Jamaica on 27 April 1801 with 318 captives. She had left Liverpool with 46 crew members and he arrived with 40. Smith died on 19 June 1801. (Note: Smith had himself been enslaved. His vessel, Solicitor General, had been wrecked on the Barbary Coast on 11 August 1795; the locals had then taken him and his crew as slaves. They were only freed around July 1797.)

Trelawney sailed from Kingston on 25 June and arrived back at Liverpool on 10 September, under the command of Captain Eglinton Richardson. (Note: Richardson died on 11 May 1803 while captain of the enslaving ship Ann.) She had suffered eight crew member deaths since first leaving Liverpool.

Year	Master	Owner	Trade	Source
1802	T.Smith; A.Roberts	Smith & Co.	Liverpool–Africa	LR

4th voyage transporting enslaved people (1802): Captain Andrew Roberts sailed from Liverpool on 17 June 1802. In 1802, 155 vessels sailed from English ports, bound for the trade in enslaved people; 122 of these vessels sailed from Liverpool.

Trelawney capsized in the River Mersey at Liverpool on 20 June as she was coming out of the dock. She was bound for an African port. Lloyd's List reported that the Trelawney that had got onshore at Liverpool had been gotten off and put into dock.

== Fate ==
By one account, Trelawney, Moon, master, was wrecked in December 1806 on the Ness Sands, in the Bristol Channel, with the loss of her captain. She was on a voyage from Bristol to Jamaica. A falling mast killed the captain; eleven crew members drowned.

However, this appears to have been Trelawney. The Trelawney of the present article is no longer in Lloyd's Register or the Register of Shipping for 1804.
