= Solicitor General (1794 ship) =

History

Great Britain
- Name: Solicitor General
- Launched: 1785, Bermuda
- Acquired: 1794
- Fate: Wrecked 11 August 1795

General characteristics
- Tons burthen: 141 (bm)
- Complement: 19
- Armament: 8 × 6-pounder guns
- Notes: Bermuda cedar

Solicitor General was launched in Bermuda in 1785. She came to England circa 1794 and first sailed as a West Indiaman but then new owners in 1795 employed her as a slave ship in the triangular trade in enslaved people. She was wrecked on the coast of North Africa on her first voyage on her way to acquire captives. Her crew were themselves enslaved, not being freed until mid-1797.

== Career ==
Solicitor General first appeared in Lloyd's Register (LR) in 1794.

In August 1794 Lloyd's List reported that Solicitor General was sailing from Antigua to Liverpool when she had put into St Kitts in a leaky condition.

Year	Master	Owner	Trade	Source & notes
1794	___ (Yeates?); J.G.John	Lightfoot	Bristol−Antigua	LR; raised 1790
1795	J.G.John; T.Smith	Lightfoot	Liverpool−Antigua; Liverpool–Africa	LR; raised 1790
1796	T.Smith	Forbes & Co.	Liverpool–Africa	LR; raised 1790

Captain Thomas Smith sailed from Liverpool on 17 July 1795. In 1795, 79 vessels sailed from English ports, bound for Africa to acquire and transport enslaved people; 59 of these vessels sailed from Liverpool.

Solicitor General was lost on the Barbary Coast on 11 August 1795. She was on a voyage from Liverpool to Africa. Her 19 crew members survived, only to have the locals enslave them. Smith and his crew were finally freed circa July 1797. While they were awaiting ransom, their captors held the crew in Passereet, a town reportedly five days travel from Santa Cruz (possibly Agadir, once the Portuguese port and fort of Santa Cruz do Cabo de Gué). There they worked “all day in the sun”.

After being ransomed, Thomas Smith died on 19 June 1801, while he was master of Trelawney, and on his eighth voyage as a master of vessels transporting enslaved people.

Seventeen ninety-five was the worst year in the period 1793–1807 for losses among British slave ships. Fifty vessels were lost that year, 40 of them on the coast of Africa, and three Africa-bound from British ports. Because she had not yet arrived on the slave coast of Africa, Solicitor General might have been classified as one of the three.
