= Trelawney (1779 ship) =

British merchant ship and whaler (1775–1812)

History

Great Britain
- Name: Trelawney
- Launched: 1775, Liverpool
- Renamed: From Clayton (1779)
- Captured: 1812

General characteristics
- Tons burthen: 292, or 295, or 300 (bm)
- Complement: 50 (1779)
- Armament: 1776: 14 × 4-pounder guns; 1779: 18 × 6-pounder guns; 1779: 28 × 9,6,&3-pounder gns + 10 swivel guns; 1781: 2 × 9-pounder + 16 × 6-pounder guns; 1783: 8 × 6-pounder guns; 1800: 2 × 4-pounder + 2 × 6-pounder guns; 1805: 2 × 9-pounder guns

Trelawney was launched in 1775 at Liverpool as Clayton, sailing as a West Indiaman. She first appeared as Trelawney in 1779. Between early 1788 and end-1790 she made two voyages as a whaler in the northern whale fishery, and one in the southern whale fishery. Her return from the southern fishery resulted in her owners suing the government for a bounty payment; the owners won. She disappeared from the registers between 1794 and 1800. In 1800 she reappeared as a coaster, sailing between the River Tyne and London. In 1809 she started sailing across the North Atlantic to Halifax, Nova Scotia, and Quebec. A United States privateer captured her in 1812.

== Career ==
Clayton first appeared in online issues of Lloyd's Register (LR) in 1776.

| Year | Master | Owner | Trade | Source & notes |
|---|---|---|---|---|
| 1778 | C.Fletcher | T.Cafe & Co. | Liverpool–Jamaica | LR |
| 1778 | C.Fletcher; S.Backhouse | T.Cafe & Co. | Liverpool–Jamaica | LR |
| 1779 | S.Backhouse | N.Ashton | Liverpool–London; "Now the Trelawney, Moore" | LR |

Trelawney first appeared in Lloyd's List's ship arrival and departure (SAD) in 1779 with Moore, master, and trade London–Jamaica. However, missing online volumes of Lloyd's Register, and missing pages in extant volumes, mean that she was first listed in Lloyd's Register in 1781.

Captain William Moor acquired a letter of marque on 22 May 1779.

| Year | Master | Owner | Trade | Source |
|---|---|---|---|---|
| 1781 | W.Moore | Parker & Co. | London–New York; Cork transport | LR |
| 1782 | J.Aldie; R.Lowrey | Long & Co. | London–Jamaica | LR |
| 1787 | R.Lowry | Long & Co. | London–Jamaica | LR |

In 1788 and 1789 Trelawney engaged in whaling in the Greenland whale fishery. There is no online copy of Lloyd's Register for 1788.

| Year | Master | Owner | Trade | Source & notes |
|---|---|---|---|---|
| 1789 | T.Jay; C.Clark | Palmer & Co. | Yarmouth–Greenland | LR; good repairs 1788 & small repairs 1789 |

The data in the table is from the records of the House of Lords concerning British Arctic whaling during the "bounty period" (1733–1824), and Marshall.

Trelawney, Captain Jay, arrived back in Norfolk from Greenland in August 1788 arrived back with two fish (whales). In March 1789 she sailed again for Greenland in company with Norfolk, Hunter, Blakeney, and William. She returned in September returned with four whales.

| Year | Master | Ground | Whales | Tuns of blubber | Seals |
| 1788 | Jay | Greenland | 2 | 19.5 | 80 |
| 1789 | Jay | Greenland | 4 | 16 | 25 |

In November 1789 it was reported that the former Greenlandman Trelawney, was fitting out for the "Spermaceti fishery" in the South Seas. She was the first vessel to have been fitted out at Norfolk for the southern fishery.

On 29 October 1789, Captain Clark sailed for the southern whale fishery. A letter dated 2 March 1790 reported that Trelawney, Captain Clarke, and Sparrow, of London, Captain Clarke, had been at Santiago, Cape Verde, "all well".

| Year | Master | Owner | Trade | Source & notes |
|---|---|---|---|---|
| 1790 | C.Clark | Palmer & Co. (Note: Two sources give the name of the owners as Hurry & Co.) | Yarmouth–Southern Fishery | LR; good repairs 1788 & small repairs 1789 |

Trelawney returned to Yarmouth on 29 December 1790, having stopped at Carton Bay, in Norfolk, on 27 December. At the time the government paid a bounty of £700 to the five vessels arriving in England from the south seas with the greatest amount of whale oil and head matter. The law stipulated that to qualify, a vessel had to have left between 1 January and 1 November, return no sooner than 14 months and no later than 28 months from the time of her departure, and return before 1 December. The Commissioners of Customs disqualified Trelawney, arguing that as she had touched at Carton Bay on her return, she had not been out the requisite 14 months. The owners sued, arguing that she had paid no duties at Carton Bay, and that when she had arrived at Yarmouth, where she paid duties, she had been out exactly 14 months. There was also a question of the paperwork attesting to her having carried the legally required number of apprentices. The court found for Trelawney's owners. Trelawney had brought back from the South Atlantic 200 tons of whale oil and ten tons of whale bone.

Lloyd's Register carried Trelawney with unchanged data through the 1794 issue. SAD data in Lloyd's List suggests that in 1791–1794 she may have been under the command of a Captain Gillis. Trelawney is absent from Lloyd's Register in 1795, and does not appear in Lloyd's List's SAD data in 1795–1796.

Trelawney may have been sold, sailing under another name. She may later have been resold, regaining her original name. Trelawney, of 287 tons (bm), launched at Liverpool in 1775, appeared in the 1800 issue of the Register of Shipping (RS), the first year of its publication. She did not reappear in Lloyd's Register.

| Year | Master | Owner | Trade | Source & notes |
|---|---|---|---|---|
| 1800 | T.Coates | J.Graham | Newcastle–London | RS |
| 1805 | Cuthbertson | Sibbald & Co. | Shields–London | RS; thorough repair 1803 & large repair 1804 |
| 1810 | Russell | Leslie & Co. | Shields–Quebec | RS; thorough repair 1806 & small repairs 1809 |

== Loss ==
Lloyd's List reported in October 1812 that an American privateer had captured Trelawney, Walker, master, as she was outbound from South Shields. The Register of Shipping for 1813 carried the annotation "CAPTURD" by Trelawney's name.
