= Sparrow (1777 ship) =

History

Great Britain
- Name: Sparrow
- Launched: 1777, Bombay (Note: Although Sparrow was reportedly built in Bombay, no vessel by that name appears in the list of vessels built by the Bombay Dockyard.)
- Fate: Captured and burnt 1796

General characteristics
- Tons burthen: 147, or 148, or 150 (bm)
- Sail plan: Snow
- Complement: 1799:25; 1803:20
- Armament: 1799:12 × 6&9-pounder guns; 1803:10 × 6-pounder guns; 1806:2 × 9-pounder + 6 × 6-pounder guns
- Notes: Teak-built

Sparrow was built in Bombay in 1777, possibly under another name. Between 1789 and 1798 Sparrow made several voyages as a whaler in the British southern whale fishery. In 1803 she was captured and recaptured. The French Navy captured and burnt her in 1806.

== Career ==
Sparrow first appeared in Lloyd's Register (LR) in 1790.

Year	Master	Owner	Trade	Source & notes
1790	W.Clark	Hurry	London–Southern Fishery	LR; raised and repairs 1789

1st whaling voyage (1789–1791): Captain Welham Clark sailed from England on 8 December 1789. A letter dated 2 March 1790 arrived at Norfolk and reported that Trelawney, Captain Clarke, and Sparrow, of London, Captain Clarke, had been at Santiago, Cape Verde, "all well". Sparrow returned on 11 June 1791.

Between 1791 and 1792 Dowson & Co. owned Sparrow.

2nd whaling voyage (1791–1792): Captain Clark sailed from England on 23 September 1791. Sparrow returned on 11 May 1792.

3rd whaling voyage (1792–1793): Captain Smith sailed from the Downs on 3 September 1792. Sparrow stopped at Cowes and on 19 September sailed from there for the Southern Fishery but with Clark as master. She stopped at Falmouth and sailed from there on 23 September. She gathered seal skins on the Brazil Banks and arrived at Gravesend with 21,000 skins on 16 July 1793, having stopped at Cork on her way back.

4th whaling voyage (1793–1794): Captain Clark sailed from England on 31 December 1793. Sparrow arrived back in England on 7 December 1795 with 13 tuns of sperm oil and 65 tuns of whale oil.

Year	Master	Owner	Trade	Source & notes
1796	W.Clark; Smith	Hurry & Co.	London–Southern Fishery	LR; raised and repairs 1789

Sparrow, built in Bombay, was admitted to registry in Great Britain on 15 February 1796.

5th whaling voyage (1796–1797): Captain Magnus Smith sailed from England in 1796, probably in March. Sparrow returned to England on 6 January 1797 with 13 tuns of sperm oil, 65 tuns of whale oil, 57 cwt of whale bone, and 21,000 seal skins.

Year	Master	Owner	Trade	Source & notes
1797	Smith; Mather	Guillaume	London–Southern Fishery	LR; raised and repaired 1795

6th whaling voyage (1797–1798): Captain John Mather sailed from England in 1797. Sparrow returned to England on 14 May 1798.

Captain Michael Humble, snr., who replaced Mather, acquired a letter of marque on 31 August 1799.

Year	Master	Owner	Trade	Source & notes
1798	J.Mather; M.Humble	Guillaume	London Southern Fishery	LR; raised 1785 & thorough repair 1798
1799	M.Humble	Humble	Liverpool–Demerara; Liverpool–Venice	LR; raised 1785 & thorough repair 1798
1802	M.Humble; Rogerson	Humble	Liverpool–Venice	LR; raised 1785 & thorough repair 1798
1804	Fawsett	Humble & Co.	Liverpool–Naples	Register of Shipping; new deck 1798 & new wales and repairs 1802

Captain John Fawcett acquired a letter of marque on 31 May 1803. In September 1803 Lloyd's List reported that Sparrow, Fawcett, master, had been taken, retaken by Commerce, M'Leeven, master, and brought into Lerwick. (Note: Commerce, of 136 tons (bm), was a French prize and a Liverpool-based slave ship.) Sparrow arrived at Liverpool on 23 September.

Year	Master	Owner	Trade	Source & notes
1804	B.Rogerson; R.Weatherly	Humble; Holland	Liverpool–Venice; Liverpool–Louisiana	LR; raised 1785 & thorough repair 1798

Captain Weatherly sailed Sparrow to New Orleans. On her way back to Liverpool Sparrow had to put into Charleston leaky.

Year	Master	Owner	Trade	Source & notes
1805	Weatherly; J.Gilmore	Holland	Liverpool–Louisiana; Liverpool–Newfoundland	LR; thorough repair 1798

== Fate ==
Lloyd's List reported in February 1806 that Sparrow, from Newfoundland to the Mediterranean, was among the vessels that the Rochefort Squadron had captured and burnt. The entry for Sparrow, Gilmore, master, in the Register of Shipping for 1806 carried the annotation "Captured".
