= Cerate =

Unctuous preparation for external application

Cerate, historically simple cerate, (from Latin cera "wax") is an unctuous preparation for external application, of a consistency intermediate between that of an ointment and a plaster. It can be spread upon cloth without the use of heat, but does not melt when applied to the skin.

Cerate consists essentially of wax (for which resin, lead acetate or spermaceti is sometimes substituted) mixed with oil, lard, and various medicinal ingredients. The cerate of the United States Pharmacopoeia is a mixture of three parts of paraffin and seven parts of lard.
