= Cetyl palmitate =

Names
- Preferred IUPAC name Hexadecyl hexadecanoate
- Other names Palmityl palmitate Palmitic acid palmityl ester Palmitic acid hexadecyl ester Palmitic acid cetyl ester n-hexadecyl palmitate Palmatic acid n-hexadecyl ester

Identifiers
CAS Number	540-10-3
3D model (JSmol)	Interactive image
ChEBI	CHEBI:75584
ChEMBL	ChEMBL2106073
ChemSpider	10427
ECHA InfoCard	100.007.943
EC Number	309-375-8
KEGG	D08888
PubChem CID	10889
UNII	5ZA2S6B08X
CompTox Dashboard (EPA)	DTXSID5047114
- InChI: InChI=1S/C32H64O2/c1-3-5-7-9-11-13-15-17-19-21-23-25-27-29-31-34-32(33)30-28-26-24-22-20-18-16-14-12-10-8-6-4-2/h3-31H2,1-2H3 Key: PXDJXZJSCPSGGI-UHFFFAOYSA-N
- SMILES: CCCCCCCCCCCCCCCCOC(=O)CCCCCCCCCCCCCCC

Properties
Chemical formula	C_{32}H_{64}O_{2}
Molar mass	480.862 g·mol^{−1}
Appearance	Colourless wax
Melting point	54 °C (129 °F; 327 K)
- Except where otherwise noted, data are given for materials in their standard state (at 25 °C [77 °F], 100 kPa). verify (what is ?) Infobox references

Hexadecyl hexadecanoate, also known as cetyl palmitate, is the ester derived from hexadecanoic acid and 1-hexadecanol. This white waxy solid is the primary constituent of spermaceti, the once highly prized wax found in the skull of sperm whales. Cetyl palmitate is a component of some solid lipid nanoparticles.

Stony corals, which build the coral reefs, contain large amounts of cetyl palmitate wax in their tissues, which may function in part as an antifeedant.

== Applications ==
Cetyl palmitate is used in cosmetics as a thickener and emulsifier.
