= Sperm oil =

Waxy liquid obtained from sperm whales

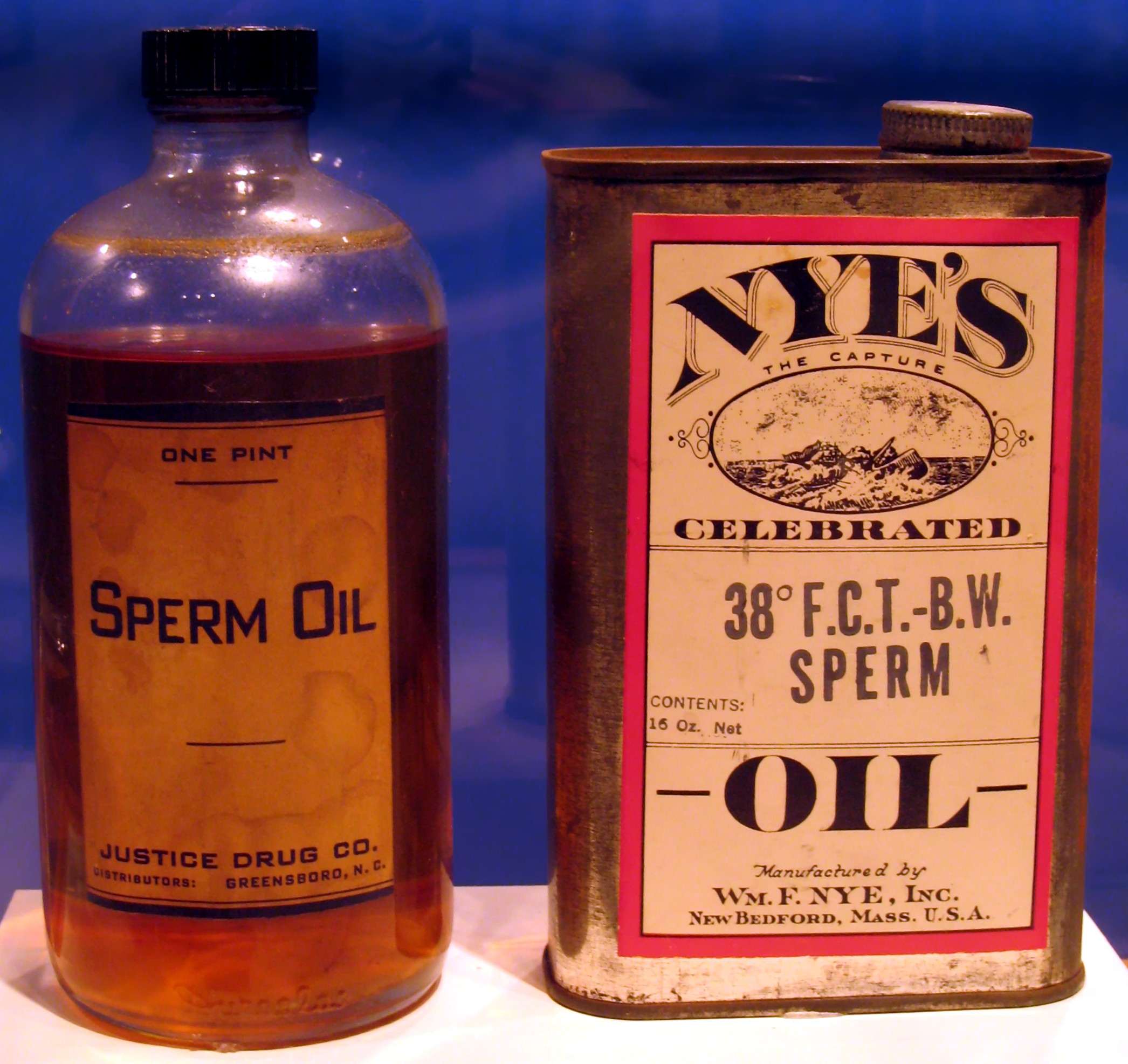

Sperm oil is a waxy liquid obtained from sperm whales. It is a clear, yellowish liquid with a very faint odor. One of its fractions is spermaceti, a highly prized type of wax. Sperm oil has a different composition from common whale oil, obtained from rendered blubber. Although it is traditionally called an "oil", it is technically a liquid wax. It is composed of wax esters with a small proportion of triglycerides, an ester of an unsaturated fatty acid, and a branched-chain fatty alcohol. It is a natural antioxidant and heat transfer agent. In the late-18th and early-19th centuries, sperm oil was prized as an illuminant for its bright, odorless flame and as a lubricant for its low viscosity and stability. It was supplanted in the late 19th century by less expensive alternatives such as kerosene and petroleum-based lubricants. With the 1987 international ban on whaling, sperm oil is no longer legally sold.

The oil from bottlenose whales was sometimes called "Arctic sperm oil." It was cheaper than but inferior to true sperm oil.

== Processing ==
Sperm oil is extracted from the spermaceti organ and the junk of the sperm whale.

After killing a sperm whale, the whalers would pull the carcass alongside the ship, cut off the cranium and haul it on deck, whereupon they would cut a hole in it and bail out the matter inside with a bucket. The primary source of sperm oil was the spermaceti organ and the junk (or "melon"), the organs that serve to focus and modulate the animal's vocalizations. The matter from these organs was stored in casks to be processed on land; sometimes it was boiled first to prevent it going rancid. The blubber also contained smaller proportions of spermaceti, which was obtained by boiling the blubber on the ship itself.

On land, the casks of head-matter were allowed to chill during the winter, causing it to congeal into a spongy and viscous mass. The congealed matter was then loaded into wool sacks and placed in a press to squeeze out its liquid. This liquid was bottled and sold as "winter-strained sperm oil". This was the most valuable product: a lubricant that remained liquid in freezing winter temperatures. When spring came and the leftover solid matter melted a bit, the liquid was strained off and sold as "spring-strained sperm oil". In summer, the matter melted some more and the liquid was strained off to leave a fully solid wax. This wax, brown in color, was then bleached and sold as "spermaceti wax".

== Chemistry ==
Physical properties of sperm oil
specific gravity	0.884 at 15.6 °C
flash point	260–266 °C
saponification value	120–150.3
unsaponifiable matter	17.5–44.0%
refractive index	1.4649 at 15.6 °C
iodine number (Wijs)	70.4–96.4
viscosity	21–23 cSt at 37.5 °C
viscosity index	180

Sperm oil has a fairly low viscosity (roughly equal to coconut oil). It retains its viscosity in high temperatures better than most oils. It does not tend to become rancid, dry out, or corrode metals. Sperm oil cannot be easily hydrogenated, and thus could not be used to make soap or margarine. It is fairly resistant to oxidization.

Spermaceti is a liquid wax, composed mostly of wax esters (chiefly cetyl palmitate) and a smaller proportion of triglycerides, with oleic acid being the most common fatty acid. The proportion of wax esters in the spermaceti organ increases with the age of the whale: 38–51% in calves, 58–87% in adult females, and 71–94% in adult males. The blubber oil of the whale is about 66% wax. When cooled to below 30 °C (86 °F), the waxes in spermaceti begin to crystallize.

Winter-strained sperm oil is roughly two-thirds wax esters and one third triglycerides. Most of the carbon chains are unsaturated, with 18:1 being the most common. Unlike other toothed whales save the Amazon river dolphin, most of the carbon chains in the wax esters are relatively long (C_{10}-C_{22}).

== Applications ==
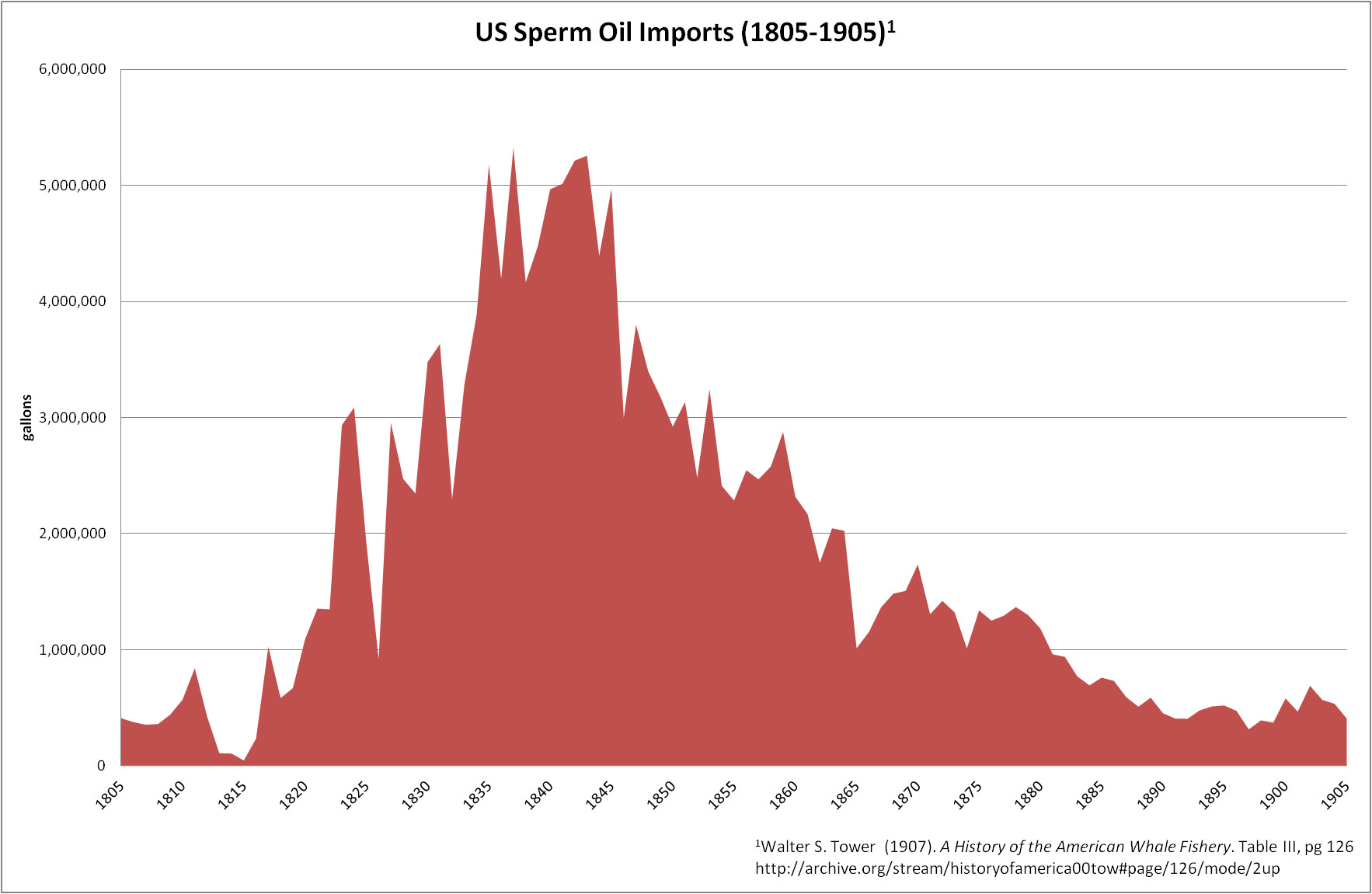
US consumption of sperm oil peaked in the mid-19th century, then saw a precipitous decline.

Sperm oil was particularly prized as an illuminant in oil lamps, as it burned more brightly and cleanly than any other available oil and gave off no foul odor. It was replaced in the late-19th century by cheaper, more efficient kerosene.

In the US, sperm oil was used in cars as an additive to automatic transmission fluid until it was banned by the Endangered Species Act. It was also a major component of hydraulic fluid in tractors (like the ubiquitous JDM Type 303 Special Hydraulic Fluid) until its withdrawal in 1974.

Prior to 1972, over 30 million lb (14 million kg) of sperm whale oil was used annually in lubricants because of its exceptional lubricity and heat stability. In 1972, the sperm whale was listed as an Endangered Species. The following year, the US Congress amended the Endangered Species Act, outlawing the killing of whales and the use of their oil. The loss of sperm oil had a profound impact in the automotive industry, where for example, transmission failures rose from under 1 million in 1972 to over 8 million by 1975.

Sperm oil was a popular lubricant. It worked well for fine, light machinery such as sewing machines and watches because it is thin, does not congeal or dry out and does not corrode metals. It was also used in heavy machinery such as locomotives and steam-powered looms because it can withstand high temperatures. In the late 20th century, jojoba oil was discovered to be a better substitute for high-friction applications because it is even more stable at high temperatures. This caused sperm oil's price to collapse to a tenth of its previous value.

Because of its very low freezing point, sperm oil saw widespread use in the aerospace industry.

Sperm oil was used to protect metals from rust. A coat of sperm oil provided a temporary protection for the metal components in firearms, because it did not dry out or gum up. It was the basis of the original (but not current) Rust-Oleum.

== Gallery ==
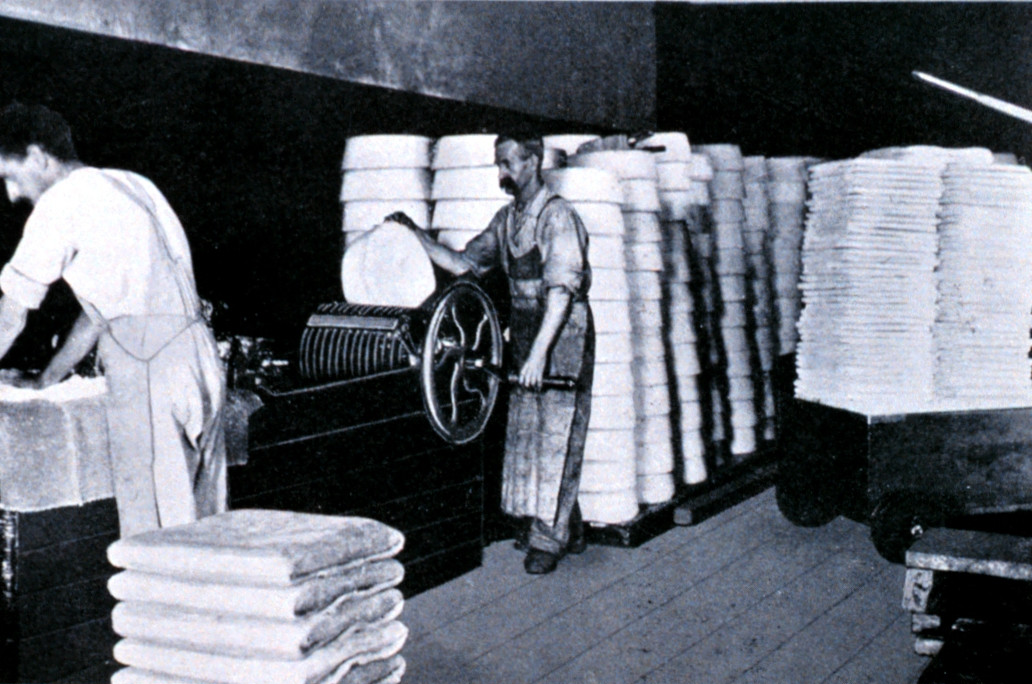
A spermaceti press

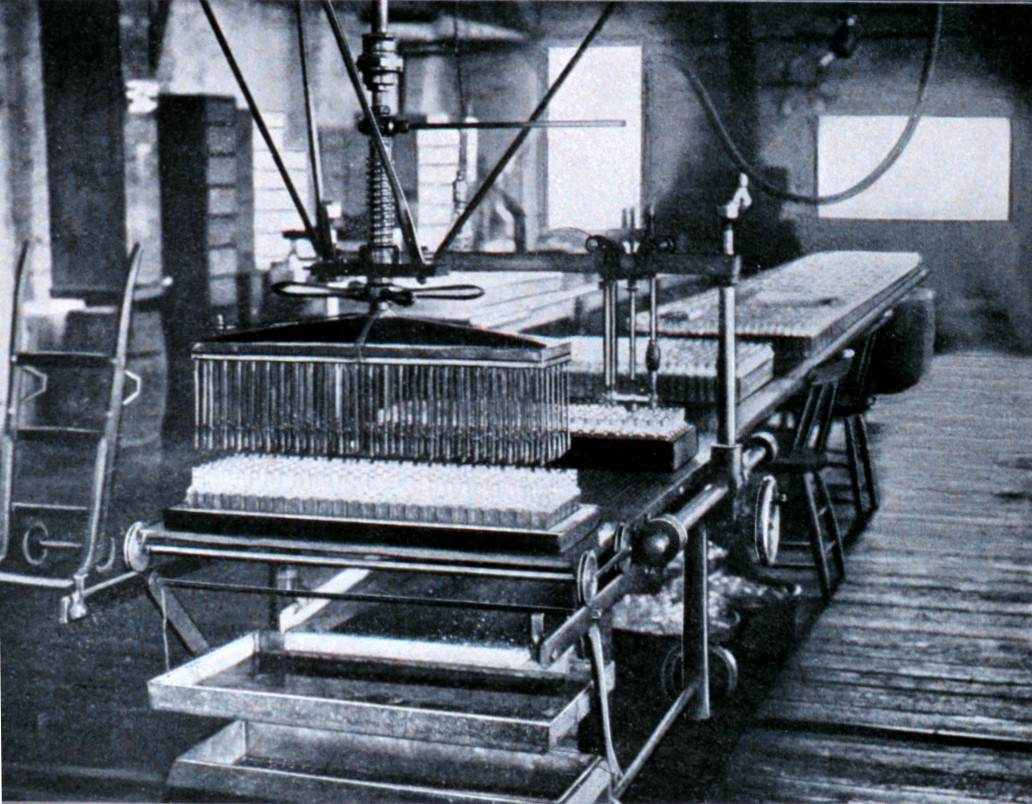
Strained sperm oil being bottled

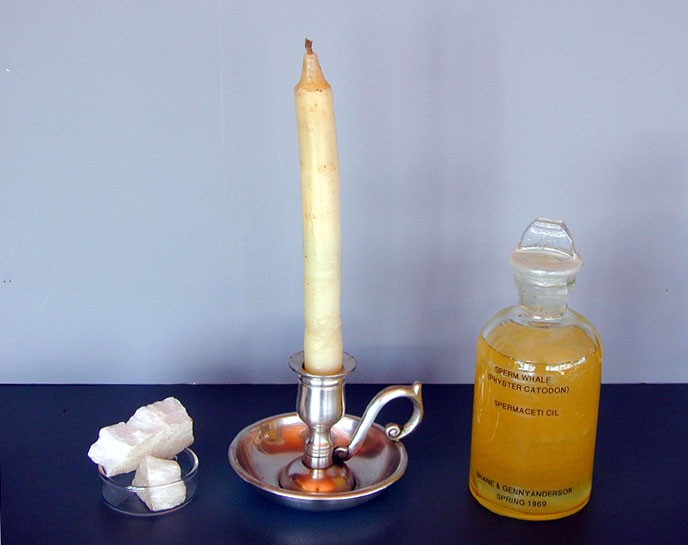
A spermaceti wax candle

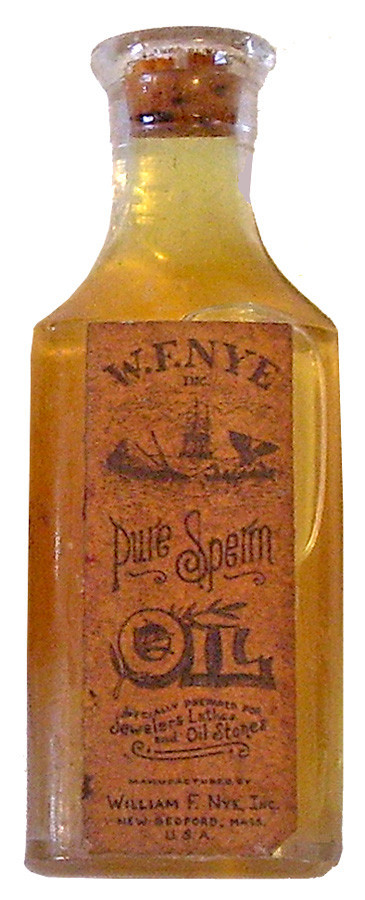
A bottle of sperm oil

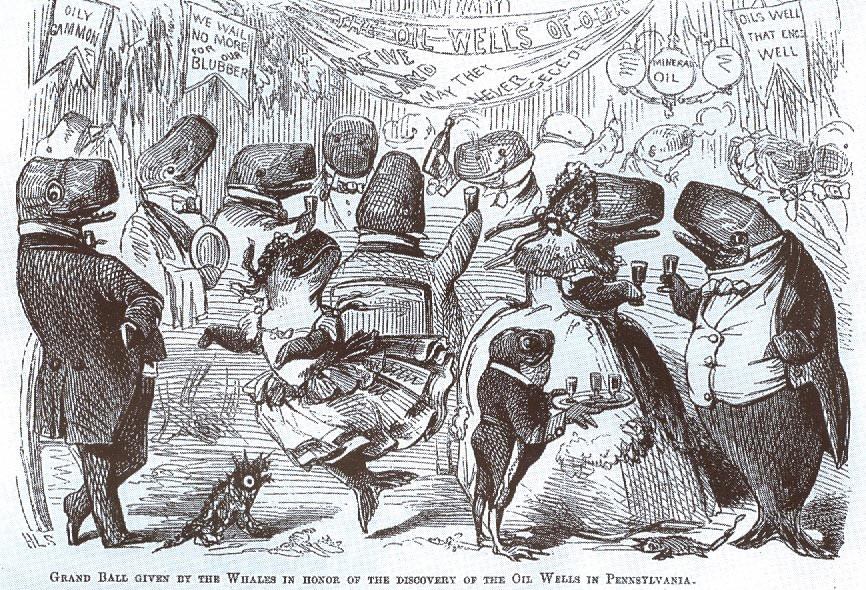
An 1861 cartoon from Vanity Fair showing Sperm Whales celebrating their decreased use for oil.

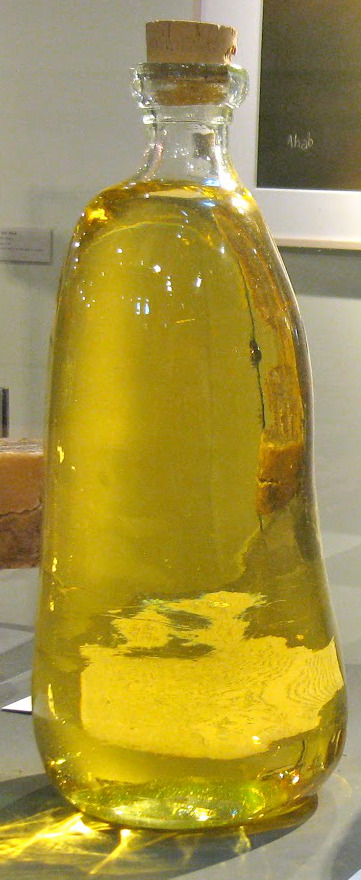
A jug of sperm oil on display at the Nantucket Whaling Museum

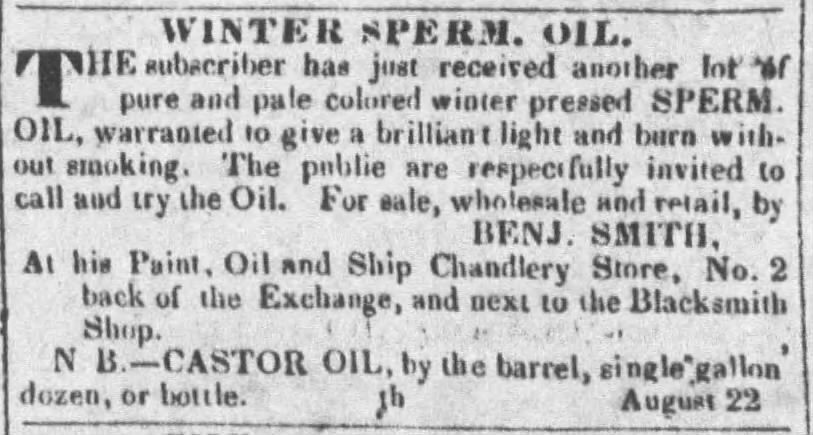
"Winter Sperm Oil" advertisement, Charleston Daily Courier, 1833

A barrel of Australian sperm oil produced at the Cheyne Beach Whaling Station
