= Fraction (chemistry) =

Quantity collected from a substance in a fractionating separation process

A fraction in chemistry is a quantity collected from a batch of a substance in a fractionating separation process. In such a process, a mixture is separated into fractions, which have compositions that vary according to a gradient. A fraction can be defined as a group of chemicals that have similar boiling points. A common fractionating process is fractional distillation, in which separation is achieved by condensing a vapor over a range of temperatures. It is used to produce liquor and various hydrocarbon fuels, such as gasoline, kerosene and diesel.

A fraction is the product of a fractionating column, a vast chamber designed to separate different substances (such as crude oil) based on their boiling point.

Fraction could also refer to a description of the composition of a mixture, e.g. mass fraction or mole fraction.

For a simpler definition a fraction is a part of the fractionating column where a compound with one boiling point can be separated from other compounds with different boiling points.
