= Jojoba ester =

Product of jojoba oil

Jojoba esters are the hydrogenation or transesterification product of Jojoba oil. Jojoba Esters are commonly used in cosmetic formulations as an emollient, due to its remarkable similarity to the natural oils produced by the human skin, and its high oxidative stability. Fully hydrogenated jojoba esters are most often small beads used to exfoliate the skin.

== Chemical structure ==
Jojoba esters are proper waxes; there is no triglyceride component of jojoba esters. Chemically, jojoba esters are a complex mixture of long chain fatty acids and fatty alcohols joined by an ester bond, resulting in a total length of 36 to 46 carbon atoms. Jojoba esters are produced by the interesterification of jojoba oil, hydrogenated jojoba oil, or a mixture of the two. Pure jojoba oil and pure hydrogenated jojoba oil are also correctly described as jojoba esters. The CTFA does not regard partially-hydrogenated jojoba oil as jojoba esters. For this reason, jojoba esters must not contain any trans-unsaturation. Jojoba esters' chemical structure is very similar to that of human sebum and of whale oil.

== Physical properties ==
Physically, jojoba esters are an odourless, colourless liquid, white cream, or hard white wax, with melting points ranging from 15 °C to 70 °C. Their texture and crystallinity may be modified by rapid cooling, thus altering their cosmetic properties. Jojoba esters are very resistant to oxidation, more so than castor oil, coconut oil, macadamia oil, even many fractions of mineral oil.

== Uses ==
Jojoba esters are mainly used as emollients in cosmetics such as lipsticks, shampoos and moisturizing lotions. Jojoba esters may be ethoxylated to form such water-soluble materials as PEG-150 Jojoba, PEG-120 Jojoba, or PEG-80 Jojoba. Jojoba esters are excellent botanical substitutes for whale oil and its derivatives, such as cetyl alcohol and spermaceti. Hydrolyzed jojoba esters (HJEs) are created via a saponification reaction which liberates more than 12 long chain fatty alcohols.

== See also ==
- Jojoba alcohol
- Jojoba wax esters
