= Jojoba alcohol =

Identifiers
CAS Number	1217546-42-3

Properties
Chemical formula	Variable
Molar mass	Variable
Appearance	Clear colorless liquid
- Except where otherwise noted, data are given for materials in their standard state (at 25 °C [77 °F], 100 kPa). Infobox references

Jojoba alcohol is the alcohol fraction obtained by the saponification of jojoba oil from the seeds of Simmondsia chinensis. Jojoba alcohol is commonly used in cosmetic formulations.

== Chemical constituents ==
Jojoba alcohol is a mixture of both saturated and unsaturated long chain alcohols of between 16 and 26 carbons in chain length, including:

- C16:0 Hexadecanol
- C17:1 cis-8-Heptadecenol
- C18:0 Octadecanol
- C18:1 cis-9-Octadecenol
- C18:1 cis-11-Octadecenol
- C20:0 Eicosanol
- C20:1 cis-11-Eicosenol
- C21:1 cis-12-Heneicosenol
- C22:0 Docosanol
- C22:1 cis-13-Docosenol
- C24:1 cis-15-Tetracosenol
- C26:0 Hexacosanol

== Physical properties ==
Jojoba alcohol is a clear, colorless liquid at room temperature.

== See also ==
- Jojoba ester
- Jojoba wax esters
