= Isopropyl jojobate =

Names
- Other names: Isopropyljojobate; Waxes and waxy substances, jojoba, iso-Pr esters

Identifiers
CAS Number	181314-46-5
ECHA InfoCard	100.120.534
EC Number	605-924-3

Properties
Chemical formula	Variable
Molar mass	Variable
- Except where otherwise noted, data are given for materials in their standard state (at 25 °C [77 °F], 100 kPa). Infobox references

Isopropyl jojobate is the ester of isopropyl alcohol and the acids derived from jojoba oil. Isopropyl jojobate is commonly used in cosmetic formulations.

== Chemical structure ==
Isopropyl jojobate is the isopropyl ester of the unfractionated saponification product of jojoba oil. It consists of a mixture of jojoba alcohols and the esters of isopropyl alcohol and jojoba acids. There are typically also unsaponified wax esters present in isopropyl jojobate.

== Physical properties ==
Isopropyl jojobate is an odorless, pale amber liquid at room temperature. The viscosity of isopropyl jojobate is much lower than that of jojoba oil.

== Uses ==
Isopropyl jojobate is often used in cosmetic formulations as a pigment wetting agent and emollient. It is often found in lipsticks, eye shadows, blushers, foundations, (especially stick foundations) and hair dyes.
