= Buena Fortuna =

Argentine game show

Buena Fortuna (Good Fortune) was a popular but short-lived Argentine television game show hosted by Julián Weich.

== History ==
"Buena Fortuna" was first televised on May 15, 2005 by Telefe. It was also transmitted internationally by "Telefe International," Telefe's satellite network. The show's final broadcast was on December 2, 2005. Executive Producers: Marcelo Fernandez & Fidel Chiatto Writers: Hector García Blanco & Mario Borovich Hosted by: Julian Weich Produced by Promofilm & Telefe contenidos

== Show ==
3/6/2 buena score Every person at "Buena Fortuna"'s studio automatically became a game participant. Those who participated on stage were chosen in a lottery way: each show goer was assigned a specific number. A machine filled with balls (similar to those used for lottery games) was then turned on, and the machine released a series of numbered balls, depending on which game is to be played, usually between two and four. Audience members whose assigned numbers appeared on the balls went on to participate on the show's main stage.

Viewers could also participate from home, by using a cellular telephone.

There was also a musical act during each show.

== Games ==
- The Ball catching game: Four contestants wear baskets on top of their heads. The public then starts throwing plastic balls at the contestants. Whoever catches the most balls after one minute, wins this game.
- The Kiss game: Two participants must put on heavy lipstick, then kiss as many people as they can in sixty seconds. Kisses to the cameraman, the television camera and the show host also count. Both men and women can play this game; because of the game's purpose, the two players are allowed to kiss members of their own sex.
- The number guessing game: About five or six contestants, one at a time, are chosen to step to the stage and play this game. The ball machine, in a way that is similar to a bingo game, then releases the balls, numbered from number one to number eighty. Participants must guess whether the next ball to be released is going to be higher or lower in number. Those that participate automatically earn money, but contestants that guess right get more money for each correct guess. Players are allowed to miss only twice.
- The Questions game: This is somewhat similar to Who Wants to Be a Millionaire or The Weakest Link. Four contestants are chosen, once again, from the public. They stand in a circle, and the show host begins by asking one of them a multiple choice question. Four answers are provided. If the contestant gives the wrong answer, that answer is erased and the contestant next to him or her gets a chance to answer. Shall the first three contestants fail to answer correctly, the fourth contestant is automatically given the score for that question. A line of squares is set up in front of each contestant. After scoring, contestants move by a square. The first contestant to score five times wins the game.
- The "Lucky Stairs" game: Towards the end of the game, the person who has earned the most money through the show joins the show host on top of a staircase. Then, a member of the player's family calls the show, and the caller gives advice as to which block on the staircase's next downward step the participant should step on. If the player steps on a block that says "pará" ("stop"), then the game, and consequently the show, is over. Participants do decide whether to take the caller's advice or step on another block. The staircase becomes narrower as the game goes on, increasing the risk of the "pará" block to turn on. Participants win money by stepping on blocks with money on them. Shall the player make it all the way down the stairs, the player wins a large amount of Argentine money.

Players also won domestic goods (such as washing machines and DVD players) through the show.
