= PEG-150 hydrogenated jojoba =

Names
- Other names Jojoba Oil PEG-150 Esters (INCI name)

Identifiers
CAS Number	329360-70-5

Properties
Melting point	58 °C (136 °F; 331 K)
- Except where otherwise noted, data are given for materials in their standard state (at 25 °C [77 °F], 100 kPa). Infobox references

PEG-150 hydrogenated jojoba is an ethoxylated version of fully hydrogenated jojoba wax and the most water soluble form of jojoba available. This versatile emollient functions as a secondary emulsifier and provides viscosity adjustments in hair care formulas and fragrance oil solubilization in aqueous solutions. PEG-150 Hydrogenated Jojoba is commonly used in cosmetics formulations.

== Physical properties ==
PEG-150 hydrogenated jojoba is a solid, flaked, free-flowing material with a melting point of 58 °C (136 °F). Testing in a 5% aqueous solution shows that it has a neutral pH, high clarity in water, and low viscosity. The HLB value is approximately 18.
