= Hydrogenated jojoba oil =

Hydrogenated jojoba oil is the end product of the complete hydrogenation of jojoba oil.

== Chemical structure ==
Hydrogenated jojoba oil is a straight-chain wax ester of 36 to 46 carbons in length, an ester bond in the approximate middle of the chain, no branching, no points of unsaturation, and terminal methyl groups at each end. As with jojoba oil, there is no triglyceride component of hydrogenated jojoba oil.

== Physical properties ==
Hydrogenated jojoba oil is a hard, crystalline wax ester. The melting point is 68-70 °C and the iodine value is < 2.0, making it one of the very few commercially available, high-melting-point wax esters of botanical origin. Hydrogenated jojoba oil is relatively colourless and odourless. Hydrogenated jojoba oil contains no trans isomers.

== Uses ==
Hydrogenated Jojoba Oil has particular functionality in cosmetics, due to its ability to strengthen the wax matrices of "stick" formulations such as lipstick, eyeliner, lip balm et al. Hydrogenated jojoba oil is often used as a material for exfoliation particles due to its uniform color, hardness, and controllable crystallinity.

== See also ==
- Hydrolyzed jojoba ester
