= Lip liner =

Cosmetic product

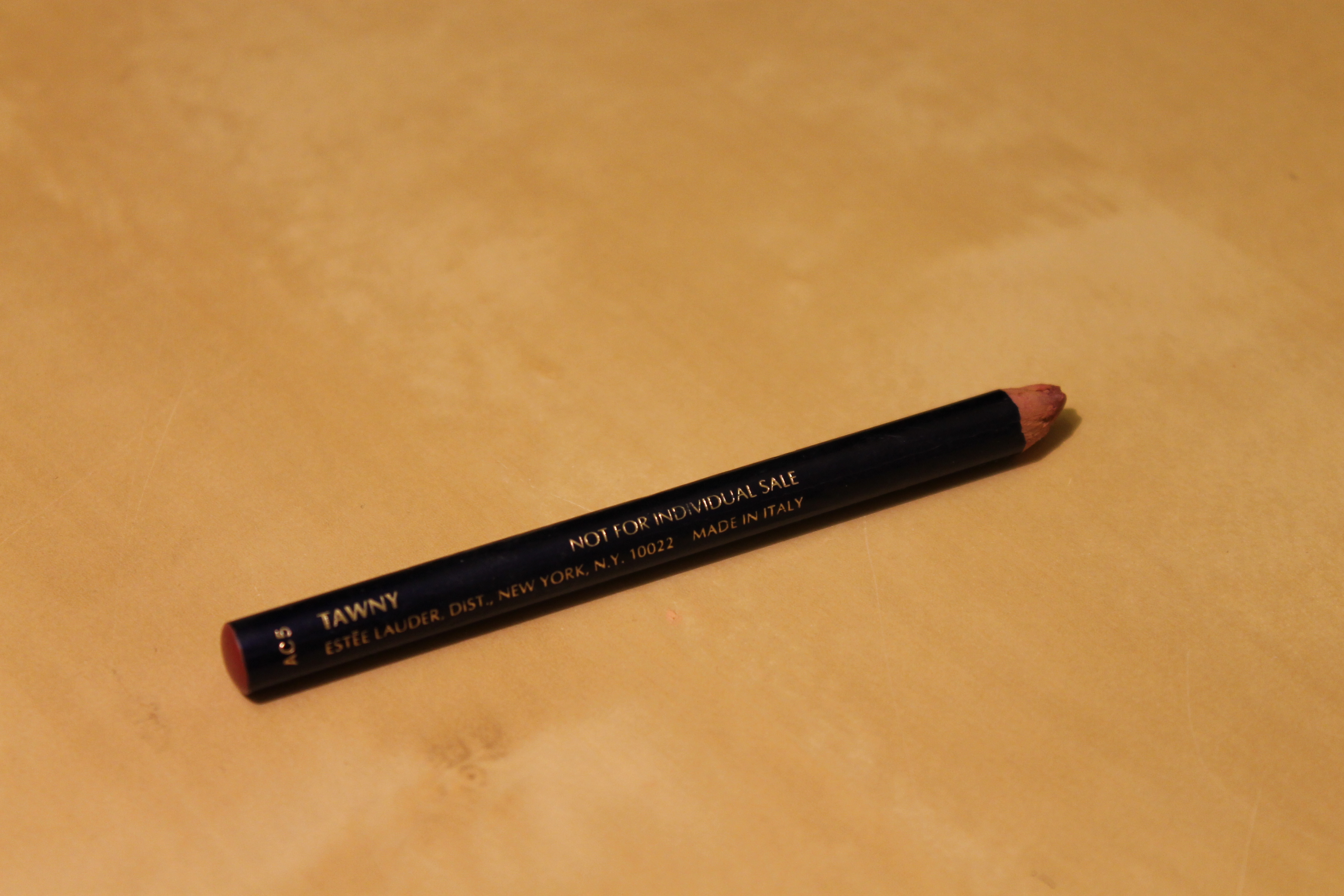
Lip liner

Lip liner, also known as a lip pencil, is a cosmetic product. It is intended to fill in uneven areas on the outer edges of the lips before applying lipstick to give a more even shape. It is also used to outline the lips, keeping lipstick inside the lip area and preventing it from "bleeding", to suggest the illusion of larger size, or to create a sharper demarcation between lips and skin so that the lips stand out more.

Alternatively, lip liner can be used to fill in the entire lip before the application of lipstick; in some cases, it is worn as a lip color on its own. The product is usually sold in a retractable tube or a pencil form that can be sharpened. Lip liner is usually available in the same range of colors as lipsticks: e.g., reds, pinks, browns, plums, etc., and the customer is advised to match the liner to lipstick so that its effects appear natural. Lip liner may also be colorless, for giving the illusion of smooth lips without adding or affecting color.

Lip liners come in different textures with harder pencils creating sharper lines.

== Ingredients ==
Like lipstick, lip liners are composed of waxes, oils, and pigment. Compared to lipstick, lip liners are firmer in consistency and more deeply pigmented, making them suitable for drawing on to the lip with precision. For these reasons, lip liners have less oil but more wax and pigment than most lipsticks. A popular wax used in the making of lip liners is Japan wax.

== History ==
Liner pencils have been in use since the 1920s in a variety of ways. Actresses to adopt the use of liner include Clara Bow, Marlene Dietrich, and Marilyn Monroe.

In the 1990s, people started using dark brown liner with lighter lipstick.

== See also ==
- Lip gloss
- Lip augmentation
- Lip stain
