= HJE =

HJE may refer to:

- Hamilton–Jacobi equation, in classical mechanics
- Hapoel Jerusalem F.C., an Israeli football club
- Hydrolyzed jojoba ester, used in cosmetic formulations
- Hospital of St John and St Elizabeth, in St John's Wood, London, England
