= Lip gloss =

Cosmetic product

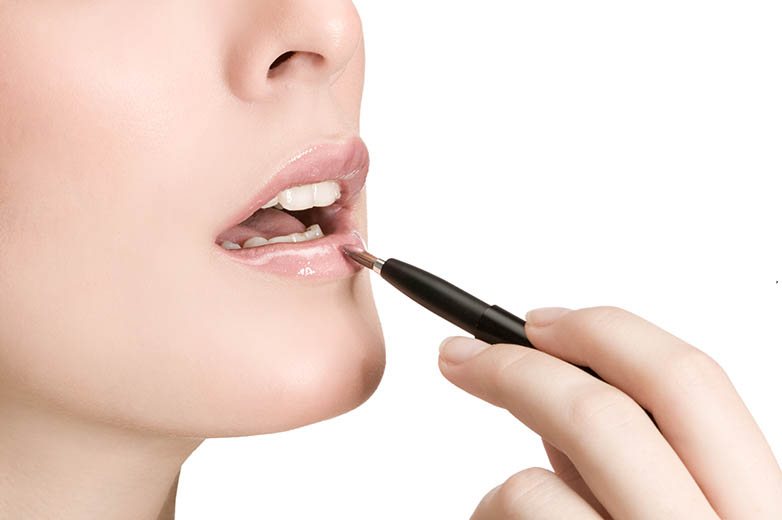
Lip gloss being applied with a retractable lip brush

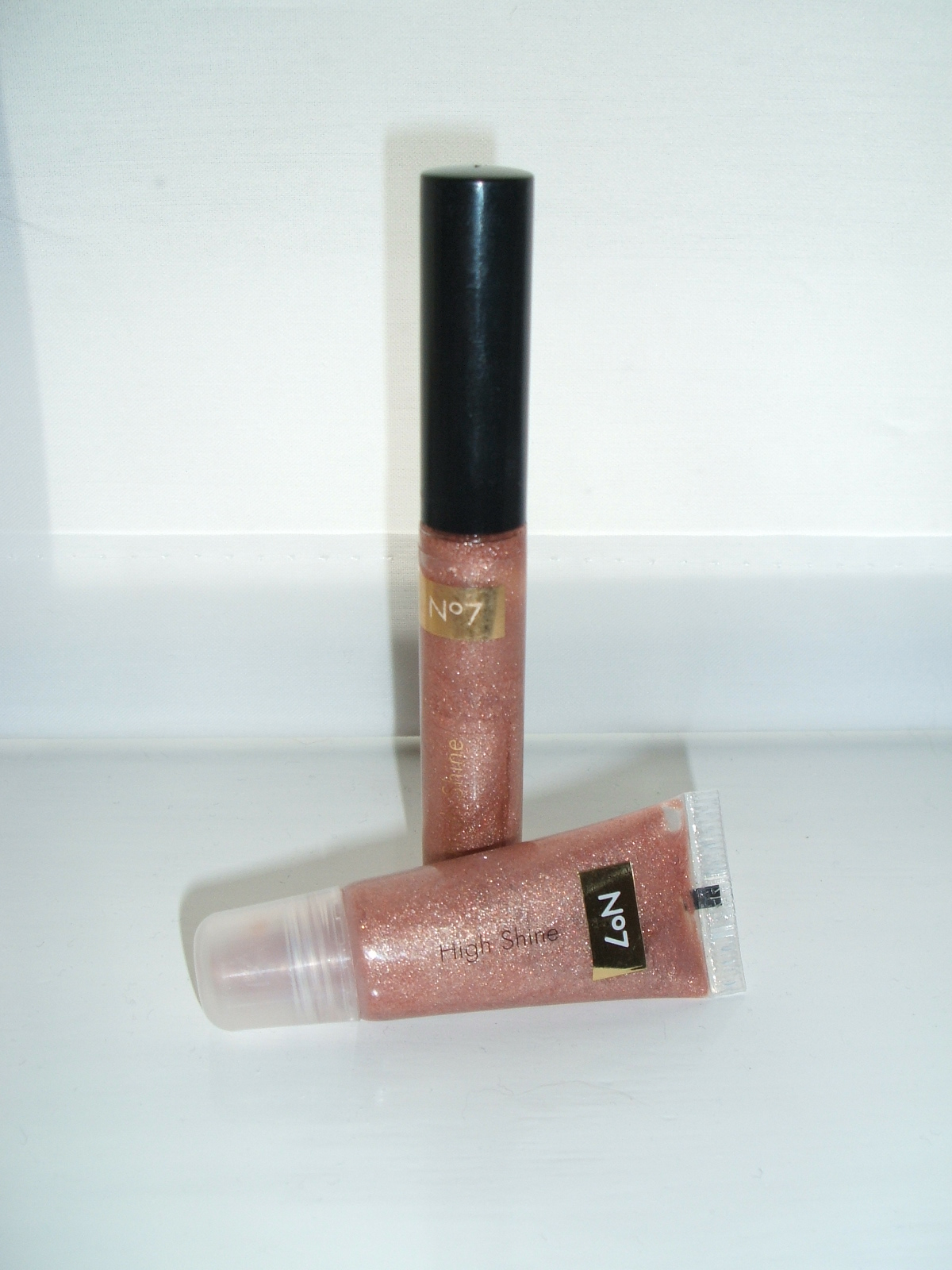
Lip gloss in squeezable tube and wand applicator formats

Lip gloss is a cosmetic used primarily to give lips a glossy luster, and sometimes to add a subtle color. It is distributed as a fluid or a soft solid (not to be confused with lip balm, which generally has medical or soothing purposes, or lipstick, which generally is a solid, cream-like substance that gives off a more pigmented color.) The product is available in ranges of opacity from translucent to solid and can have variously frosted, glittery, glossy, and metallic finishes.

== Types ==
Like lipstick, lip gloss comes in many forms and may be applied differently. It can be contained in a small cylinder and applied with a rounded or sloped applicator wand (known as a doe foot applicator) or with a built-in lip brush. It can come in a small, soft, squeezable plastic tube designed to be applied directly to the lips or applied with a fingertip or lip brush, as well as in a roll-on form. Solid or semisolid glosses come in boxes or tubes and sometimes blur the distinction between lip gloss and lip balm.

Basic lip gloss simply adds shine to the lips without color. Colored lip gloss adds a combination of color and shine. Glittery lip gloss has a glitter base, with or without color.

New types of "plumping" lip gloss contain ingredients that make the lips appear softer and plumper. These are a cheap, easy, and usually harmless alternative if compared to collagen, Restylane, Juvederm, or fat injections. Such lip glosses are popularly known as lifter glosses. They are not as effective, however, because the effects are temporary. Plumping lip gloss can also leave a burning sensation on the lips when first applied. The illusion of fuller lips can also be achieved through a cooling ingredient, such as Menthone Glycerin Acetal.

Lip gloss is often used when a person wants to have some color on their lips but does not want an intense, solid lip color effect (i.e., a more "made-up" look), as a lipstick would create. Lip gloss is also often used as an introduction to makeup. You can find light shimmery lip glosses in many introduction to makeup kits. It is often used by preteen and young teenage girls who want to wear some makeup but are too young to wear more intense lipstick colors. It is also common for young women who do not like to wear makeup but have to attend a formal occasion. It can be applied on top of lipstick to increase the gloss of a color or to add depth as in the case of glitter gloss.

== Ingredients ==
Like lipstick, lip gloss is a mixture of waxes, oils, and pigments. However, lip gloss contains fewer pigments, and those used are often pale in color or diluted (<3%). Furthermore, the free-flowing nature of the product requires less wax. The principal components are lanolin, which feels good on the lips due to its moisturizing qualities and imparts gloss, and polybutene.

== Health and safety ==
Lip gloss products are generally considered safe when used as directed; however, like other cosmetic products, they may pose health considerations for some users. Certain ingredients commonly found in lip gloss, such as fragrances, flavorings, preservatives, and color additives, can cause allergic reactions or skin irritation in sensitive individuals. Symptoms may include redness, dryness, itching, or swelling of the lips or surrounding skin.

Some lip gloss formulations contain trace amounts of substances that are subject to regulatory limits, including heavy metals such as lead, which may be present as contaminants in color pigments. Regulatory agencies in many countries, including the United States and members of the European Union, set maximum allowable levels for such substances in cosmetics to reduce potential health risks.

Lip gloss products may also contribute to hygiene concerns, as applicators that come into direct contact with the lips can harbor bacteria if shared or improperly stored. For this reason, manufacturers and health authorities generally advise against sharing lip cosmetics and recommend replacing products regularly.

== History ==
Lip gloss was invented by Max Factor in 1930. He wanted to create a lip product that would make lips shiny and glossy for films. Factor created makeup for the movie industry. He developed makeup specifically for actresses starring in black and white films. Women were inspired by movie actresses to embrace this makeup trend. This led to the popularity of lip gloss. The first commercially available lip gloss was Max Factor's X-Rated, launched in 1932. The original formula was sold until 2003, when Procter and Gamble retired the product.

== Pop culture ==
Lip gloss has been a recurring symbol of femininity, youth culture, and personal expression since its invention in the 1930s. Below is a list of notable cultural moments, products, and references involving lip gloss across music, film, television, and celebrity culture.

=== Music ===
- Lil Mama – "Lip Gloss" (2007): Brooklyn-born rapper Lil Mama released "Lip Gloss" as her debut single on Jive Records in 2007. The song peaked at No. 10 on the Billboard Hot 100 and was certified Gold by the RIAA in February 2008. This song was used as background music for Prada’s 2010 Spring/Summer runway show. In 2025, she released a lip gloss line, the “It's Popppin’” collection, with Vaniteaset Cosmetics.
- Charli XCX – "Lipgloss" feat. CupcakKe (2017): Charli XCX included "Lipgloss" as the closing track on her mixtape Number 1 Angel (2017).

=== Celebrities ===
- Paris Hilton has self-described her early 2000s look as “glossy lips, cat eye lashes and being tan,” reflecting her continual use of lip gloss at that time.

== Consumer trends ==
While lipstick use has been declining among young Gen Z consumers, lip gloss use is rising. Some companies like have capitalized on this trend by releasing new lip gloss lines that reflect current trends. At one point, Lancome was selling 20 “Juicy Tubes” lip glosses per minute in the United States. Lip gloss phone cases and keychains have also popularized lip gloss, due to their spread on social media. Summer Friday's is another lip care company that has shattered the industry, in 2023 it was the "most searched for lip care product on Google". In 2025 "Summer Friday's made up 0.3 percent of the website's total sales". This shows the magnitude of the increasing skincare trends, but also the surge in lip product sales.

== See also ==
- Lip augmentation
- Lip liner
- Lip stain
