= Lip stain =

Cosmetic lip product

A lip stain is a sheer, durable cosmetic used to color the lips. Lip stains are differentiated from other lip cosmetics by the fact that they penetrate the skin, rather than covering it. This results in a longer wear time and lower probability of smudging. A lip stain is also generally matte, as opposed to a lip tint, which is similarly sheer but may be glossy.

== Description ==
Lip stains generally use a water-based formulation to allow them to penetrate into the skin, rather than sitting on top of it. As a result, lip stains are long-lasting and durable against smudging and transferring. The range of colors lip stains are available in is limited by the number of safe water-soluble dyes. Stains are inherently matte as a result of absorbing into the skin. Lip tints are very similar to lip stains, but they tend to have a glossy finish. Some lip stains can also be used to stain skin elsewhere, such as the cheeks as a blusher, the nipples as a tint, or stippled across the face as fake freckles.

Lip stains fall into two general categories. Traditional lip stains are applied to the lips, after which the solvent evaporates, leaving behind a stain. Peel-off stains instead dry into a mask layer that is then peeled to reveal the stain.

== History ==
Hazel Bishop was credited with inventing the first "kissproof" lipstick. This lipstick used bromo acid dyes to stain the skin, resulting in a longer wear time and less risk of transfer. Bishop noted that relying on staining with dyes alone created "a "thin water-colored" look which, in my opinion, is neither satisfactory or desirable to the American women." Her formulation therefore combined stain-based color with traditional lip-coating pigments. Bishop's lipstick sold out on the first day it was launched, and her brand, Hazel Bishop Inc., controlled a quarter of the lipstick market within the next few years. However, the formulation was changed in 1954 after Bishop left the company.

The Benetint Lip & Cheek Stain is one of the earliest modern lip stains. It was invented in San Francisco in 1976 by sisters Jean and Jane Ford, the soon-to-be founders of Benefit Cosmetics, from a mixture of boiled rose petals and carmine. The product was originally created as a nipple stain at the request of an exotic dancer, but it eventually gained popularity for use on the lips and cheeks. Dahvi Shira of Ipsy credits Benetint with starting "the craze" of lip stains.

Lip stains (called lip tints in K-beauty circles) became popular in Korea in the 2010s. Lip stains appealed to the desire for natural-looking cosmetics in Korea, and K-beauty lip stains tend to be less pigmented as a result. Daniella Jung, who works in K-beauty curation, claimed that lip stains were foundational to Korean beauty routines as of 2026. Stains also gained popularity in Japan, where makeup artists adopted the Korean "gradient lip" trend in which a concentrated stain applied to the inside of the lip faded to a natural color at the outer edges. The use of a stain prevented the gradient from smudging after application.

The popularity of lip stains increased during the COVID-19 pandemic since stains are less likely to smudge or transfer to face masks. Peel-off lip stains, which are applied to the lips and peeled off after the skin has been stained, gained popularity on social media a few years later. A peel-off lip stain from Wonderskin became the most sold beauty product on TikTok Shop in 2024, and Elle noted a record number of lip stain and liner product launches that year as well.

== Ingredients ==
Lip stains are generally water-based, which limits the usable colorants to soluble dyes as opposed to the greater variety of pigments available for lipid-based lip products. Alcohol is a common ingredient in water-based lip stains used to help the stain set quickly, though it is noted to have a drying effect. Glycerin and butylene glycol may also be used as solvents. Cream-based stains may instead use isododecane and dimethicone. Various colorants may be used, including synthetic dyes and naturally-derived dyes from ingredients like beetroot or minerals.

Some stains contain additional elements that sit atop the skin to provide a non-matte finish. Ingredients like hyaluronic acid, squalane, and jojoba oil may be included to moisturize the lips. Certain peel-off lip stains use polyvinyl alcohol to create the peelable effect.
