= Jojoba seed powder =

Powder used in cosmetics

Jojoba seed powder is a powder of the ground seeds of the jojoba, Simmondsia chenensis. It is commonly used in cosmetic formulations.
