= Simmondsin =

Chemical compound

Clinical data
- ATC code: none

Identifiers
- IUPAC name: (2Z)-2-[(2S,3R,4S,6R)-2-hydroxy-3,4-dimethoxy-6-[(2R,3R,4S,5S,6R)-3,4,
- CAS Number: 51771-52-9
- PubChem CID: 6437384
- ChemSpider: 4941947
- UNII: O51H15R39K
- CompTox Dashboard (EPA): DTXSID901027519

Chemical and physical data
- Formula: C_{16}H_{25}NO_{9}
- Molar mass: 375.374 g·mol^{−1}
- 3D model (JSmol): Interactive image
- SMILES: N#C\C=C2/[C@H](O[C@@H]1O[C@@H]([C@@H](O)[C@H](O)[C@H]1O)CO)C[C@H](OC)[C@H](OC)[C@H]2O
- InChI: InChI=1S/C16H25NO9/c1-23-9-5-8(7(3-4-17)11(19)15(9)24-2)25-16-14(22)13(21)12(20)10(6-18)26-16/h3,8-16,18-22H,5-6H2,1-2H3/b7-3+/t8-,9+,10-,11+,12-,13+,14-,15+,16-/m1/s1; Key:KURSRHBVYUACKS-XGYNEUJOSA-N

Simmondsin is a component of jojoba seeds (pronounced "ho-HO-bah") (Simmondsia chinensis). While it had been considered toxic due to jojoba seed meal causing weight loss in animals, in recent years its appetite suppressant effect has also been researched as a potential treatment for obesity. It is thought to reduce appetite by increasing levels of cholecystokinin.
