= Jojoba wax esters =

Names
- Other names: Jojoba oil, ethoxylated; Jojoba wax PEG-80 esters; PEG-80 jojoba; Jojoba wax PEG-120 esters; PEG-120 jojoba

Identifiers
CAS Number	159518-81-7
ECHA InfoCard	100.111.313

Properties
Chemical formula	Variable
Molar mass	Variable
- Except where otherwise noted, data are given for materials in their standard state (at 25 °C [77 °F], 100 kPa). Infobox references

Jojoba wax esters are polyethylene glycol derivatives of the acids and alcohols obtained from the saponification of jojoba oil. With an average ethoxylation value of 80, it is known as jojoba wax PEG-80 esters or PEG-80 jojoba. With an average ethoxylation value of 120, it is known as jojoba wax PEG-120 esters or PEG-120 jojoba. Jojoba wax esters are used in cosmetic formulations as emollients.
