= Hydrolyzed jojoba ester =

A hydrolyzed jojoba ester (HJE) is the hydrolysate of jojoba ester derived by acid, enzyme or other method of hydrolysis. Hydrolyzed jojoba esters are commonly used in cosmetic formulations.

== Chemical structure ==
Hydrolyzed jojoba esters are a mixture of the free fatty acids, free fatty alcohols and wax esters resulting from the saponification reaction (cleaving the ester bond) of jojoba oil. These free fatty acids and free fatty alcohols are unbranched aliphatic monounsaturates with a chain length of C16 to C26.

== Physical properties ==
Hydrolyzed jojoba esters are a highly viscous, tacky gel at room temperature. They are a pale straw color and have no clearly defined melting point. They are soluble in most alcohols, glycols and water in certain pH ranges. The pH is typically above 10. When applied to skin, they form a water-resistant barrier which gives desirable substantivity to some cosmetic formulations.

== Uses ==
The topical substantivity and water-resistance of hydrolyzed jojoba esters make them well suited to hold other substances on the surface of the skin or hair. Examples are: sunscreens and UV filters, pigments (for decorative cosmetics), insect repellents, quaternium hair conditioning agents, fragrance, and botanical extracts. Hydrolyzed jojoba esters can extend the moisturizing properties of traditional emulsions, and work as a refatting agent in astringents and toners. The high pH of Hydrolyzed jojoba esters make them suitable as a gel neutralizer to thicken carbomer gels. The most common applications are sunscreens, fragranced lotions, and hair conditioning agents. Hydrolyzed Jojoba Esters created via a saponification reaction contain more than 12 natural long chain fatty alcohols (C16-C26), including natural docosanol (C22:0) known to be an effective anti-viral agent. Hydrolyzed Jojoba Esters containing these natural Jojoba Alcohols has been shown to be 50 times stronger in in-vitro testing than synthetic docosanol (C22:0) in combating the Herpes Simplex Virus (HSV-1).
