= Hazel Bishop =

American chemist and founder of a cosmetics company

- Bishop applying lipstick, 1969
- Born: Hazel Gladys Bishop; August 17, 1906; Hoboken, New Jersey
- Died: December 5, 1998 (aged 92); Rye, New York
- Education: Barnard College (Graduated 1929)
- Occupation: Chemist
- Employer(s): Hazel Bishop, Inc.
- Known for: Lipstick
- Parent(s): Henry and Mabel Bishop

Hazel Gladys Bishop (August 17, 1906 – December 5, 1998) was an American chemist, inventor, and entrepreneur, and the founder of the cosmetics company Hazel Bishop, Inc. She was the inventor of the first long-lasting lipstick.

== Early life ==
Bishop was born in Hoboken, New Jersey, and was one of two children of Henry and Mabel Bishop. Her father was a businessman and ran a dozen successful enterprises that included numerous stores in Hoboken. She attended Barnard College in New York, originally enrolling in pre-med, with intentions of becoming a physician. She was graduated from Barnard in 1929 with a B.A. in chemistry, with plans on attending Columbia for her graduate medical studies. Bishop attended Columbia in the evenings for her graduate classes in the fall of 1929, but the stock market crash that occurred in October of that same year resulted in the end of her academic career.

== Career ==
From 1935 to 1942, she worked as research assistant to A.B. Cannon in a dermatological laboratory at the Columbia University College of Physicians and Surgeons. Here, she was introduced to the business side of cosmetics, as A.B. Cannon was one of the founders of the cosmetics company, Almay. In 1942, she worked as an organic chemist for Standard Oil Development Company designing fuels for airplanes during World War II. During her time there she discovered the cause of deposits affecting superchargers of aircraft engines. In 1945, she joined the Socony Vacuum Oil Company, where she worked until 1950.

=== Lipstick invention ===
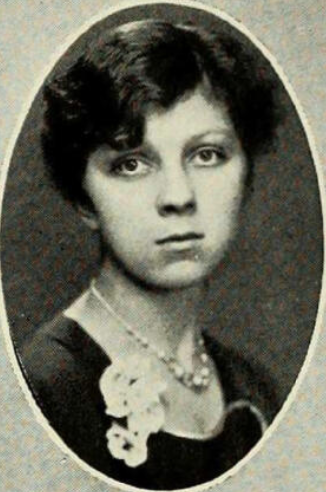
Hazel Bishop, from the 1929 yearbook of Barnard College

Bishop’s interest in lipstick began in her cooperation with Dr. A.B. Cannon, and as the popularity of red lipsticks began to rise amidst the World War. Bishop wanted a longer-lasting, “nondrying, nonirritating, long-wearing” version. Inspired by her mother's advice to "open your own business, even if it's only a peanut stand," Bishop began conducting experiments on her own time. In the 1930s, she developed a pimple concealer and mentholated tissues, which never went to market. Aiming to appeal to a wider market, Bishop began experimenting in her own small kitchen with staining dyes, oils, and molten wax. The goal was a non-drying, smudge-proof, long-lasting lipstick that would not smear on clothing or cups. The resultant mixture, formed into a mold, was called "No-Smear Lipstick."

In 1948, she and Alfred Berg founded Hazel Bishop Inc. to manufacture these "No-Smear Lipsticks." The lipstick debuted at Barnard College Club of New York in 1949 and in stores in 1950. The brand was unveiled in the summer of 1950 at Lord & Taylor, where the lipstick tubes sold for $1 each. The product proved to be a success, selling out on its first day of launch. Bishop and Berg then turned to Raymond Spector, an advertiser, to help market the lipstick to consumers, giving Spector shares in the company rather than a specified budget.

In 1951, Bishop became the first woman to appear solo on the cover of Business Week.

Bishop's innovative use of bromo acids would set in motion what would be known as the "lipstick wars." with competitors such as Revlon making their own versions of Bishop's formula in vying for dominance of the cosmetics market. The advent of the "no smear" lipstick would prove to be a success for Bishop, as her debut line would not only sell out on the first day, but end up taking over 25% of the American lipstick market.

In four years, sales soared to $10 million.

Bishop lost control of the company in 1954 in a proxy fight with majority stockholders, led by Spector. The case was settled on February 17, 1954, with the company (of which Spector was chairman and holder of 92% of the stock) purchasing Bishop's 8% of company stock, with the stipulation that she refrain from selling products under her own name and that she make clear in future ventures that she was no longer associated with Hazel Bishop, Inc.[4]

After leaving the company, she became a consultant to the National Association of Leather Glove Manufacturers and developed "Leather Lav," a leather glove cleaner. She then founded H.B. Laboratories, Inc. to produce additional leather products.

Bishop also developed a foot care product, marketed by H.G.B. Products Corporation, and, in 1957, created a solid perfume stick called Perfemme.

Bishop only wore cosmetic products that she invented or curated on her own.

Bishop was a successful businesswoman on Wall Street. In 1962, she became a stockbroker and financial analyst, and was an expert regarding cosmetics stocks, first with Bache and Co. (1962–1968), then for Hornblower & Weeks-Hemphill Noyes in 1967, and ultimately for Evans & Co. (1968–1981).

She was a sought-after speaker at the annual technical meetings of a variety of groups in the cosmetics industry, including the Society of Cosmetic Chemists, the Columbus Section of the American Chemical Society, the Fragrance Foundation, and American Society of Perfumers' Annual Symposium.

In 1978, Bishop became a professor at the Fashion Institute of Technology in New York City. Here, she specialized in cosmetics marketing. She was appointed to the Revlon Chair in Cosmetics Marketing in 1980. Bishop helped develop a curriculum whose focus included marketing and merchandising principles, advertising, promotion, and publicity campaign concepts, and product knowledge. She stopped teaching in 1986, though she remained involved with the Fashion Institute as a consultant.

== Professional involvement ==
Bishop was involved in a plethora of professional organizations; she was widely recognized for her strides in science by the American Institute of Chemists and was an active participant in the American Chemical Society, being cited for her notable contributions to the field, and the Society of Women Engineers. Bishop published in a variety of scientific journals. She became known as a pioneer in both science and economics after her death.

== Death ==
She died on December 5, 1998, in the Osborn Home in Rye, New York, at the age of 92. She is survived by her niece, Randa Bishop Zachariou, and her two nephews, Author Lipper and A. Michael Lipper.
