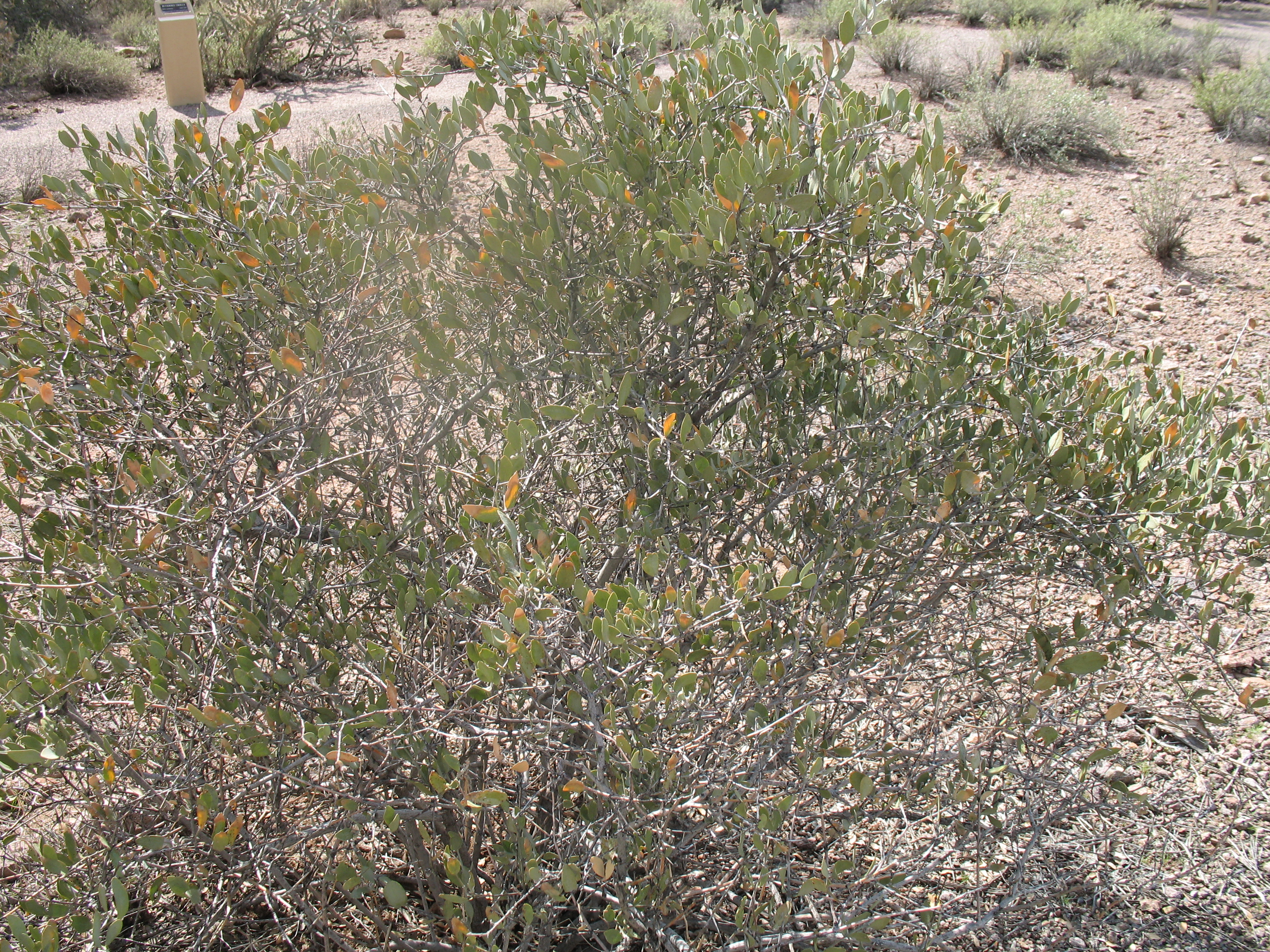
- Jojoba (Simmondsia chinensis) shrub

Scientific classification
- Kingdom: Plantae
- Clade: Tracheophytes
- Clade: Angiosperms
- Clade: Eudicots
- Order: Caryophyllales
- Family: Simmondsiaceae; Tiegh.
- Genus: Simmondsia; Nutt.
- Species: S. chinensis

Binomial name
- Simmondsia chinensis (Link) C.K.Schneid.

Synonyms
- List: Brocchia dichotoma Mauri; Buxus californica (Nutt.) Baill.; Buxus chinensis Link; Celastrus obtusatus C.Presl; Simmondsia californica Nutt.; Simmondsia pabulosa Kellogg

= Jojoba =

Species of North American desert shrub

Jojoba (/həˈhoʊbə/; botanical name: Simmondsia chinensis) – also commonly called goat nut, deer nut, pignut, wild hazel, quinine nut, coffeeberry, and gray box bush – is an evergreen, dioecious shrub native to the Southwestern United States and northern Mexico. Simmondsia chinensis is the sole species of the family Simmondsiaceae, placed in the order Caryophyllales. The name "jojoba" is a hispanicization from hohohwi in Oʼodham, not to be confused with the almost homographic but unrelated "jujube" (Ziziphus zizyphus) commonly grown in China.

Jojoba is grown commercially in its area of origin and in other (semi-)arid regions to produce jojoba oil, a liquid wax ester extracted from its seed. Jojoba oil is highly valued in the cosmetics industry.

== Distribution ==
The plant is a native shrub of the Sonoran Desert, Colorado Desert, Baja California desert, and California chaparral and woodlands habitats in the Peninsular Ranges and San Jacinto Mountains. It is found in southern California, Arizona, and Utah (U.S.), and Baja California state (Mexico).

Jojoba is endemic to North America, and occupies an area of approximately 260,000 square kilometers (100,000 sq mi) between latitudes 25° and 31° North and between longitudes 109° and 117° West.

== Description ==
Simmondsia chinensis, or jojoba, typically grows to 1–2 meters (3.3–6.6 ft) tall, with a broad, dense crown, but there have been reports of plants as tall as 3 meters (9.8 ft).

The leaves are opposite, ovalish in shape, 2–4 centimeters (0.79–1.57 in) long and 1.5–3 centimeters (0.59–1.18 in) broad, thick, waxy, and glaucous gray-green in color. Jojoba is an evergreen, but it sometimes sheds its leaves as a response to severe droughts.

The flowers are small and greenish-yellow, with 5–6 sepals and no petals. The plant typically blooms from March to May.

=== Reproduction ===
Each plant is dioecious, with hermaphrodites being extremely rare. In the wild, the sexes appear in the ratio of 5 males for 1 female. The fruit is an acorn-shaped ovoid, three-angled capsule 1–2 centimeters (0.39–0.79 in) long, partly enclosed at the base by the sepals. The mature seed is a hard oval that is dark brown and contains an oil (liquid wax) content of approximately 54%. An average-sized bush produces 1 kilogram (2.2 lb) of pollen, to which few humans are allergic.

The female plants produce seed from flowers pollinated by the male plants. Jojoba leaves have an aerodynamic shape, creating a spiral effect, which brings wind-borne pollen from the male flower to the female flower.^{[?]} Even though the male flowers are attractive for bees and are a pollen source, jojoba is anemophilous because its female flowers are not attractive to pollinators. In the Northern Hemisphere, pollination occurs during February and March. In the Southern Hemisphere, pollination occurs during August and September.^{[?]}

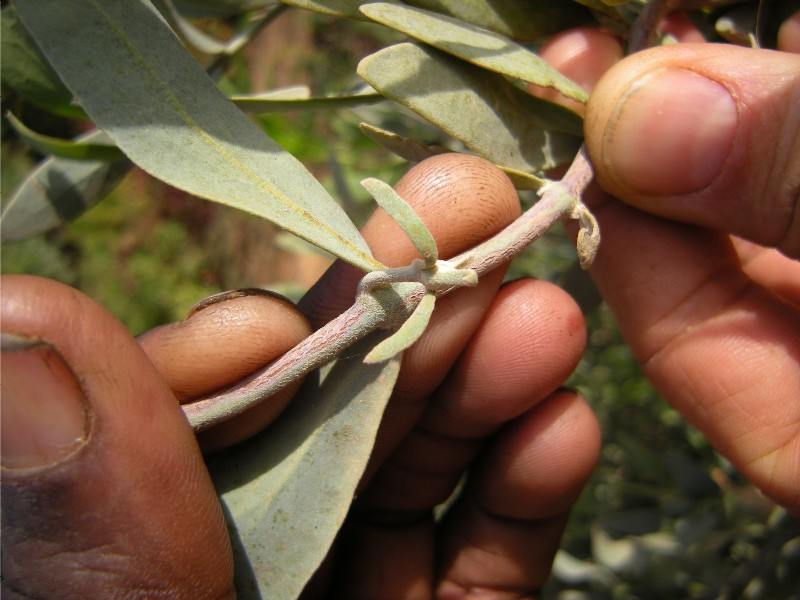
Female flower

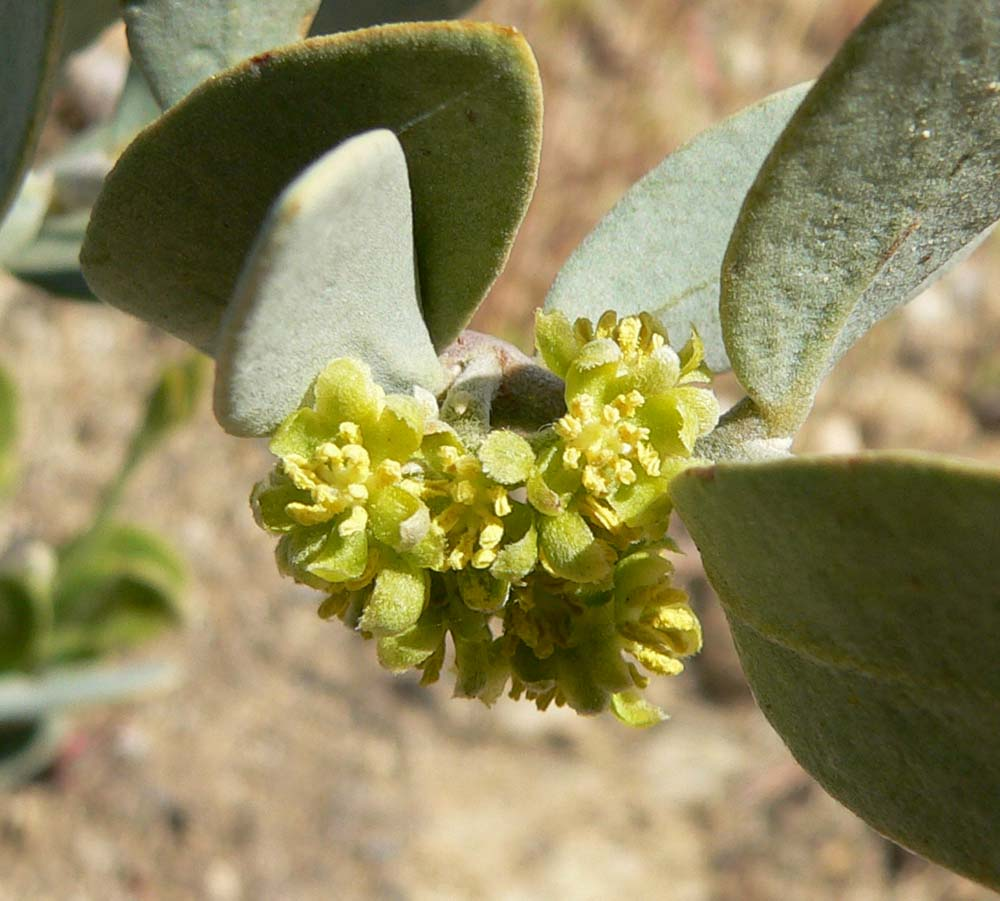
Close-up of male Simmondsia chinensis flowers

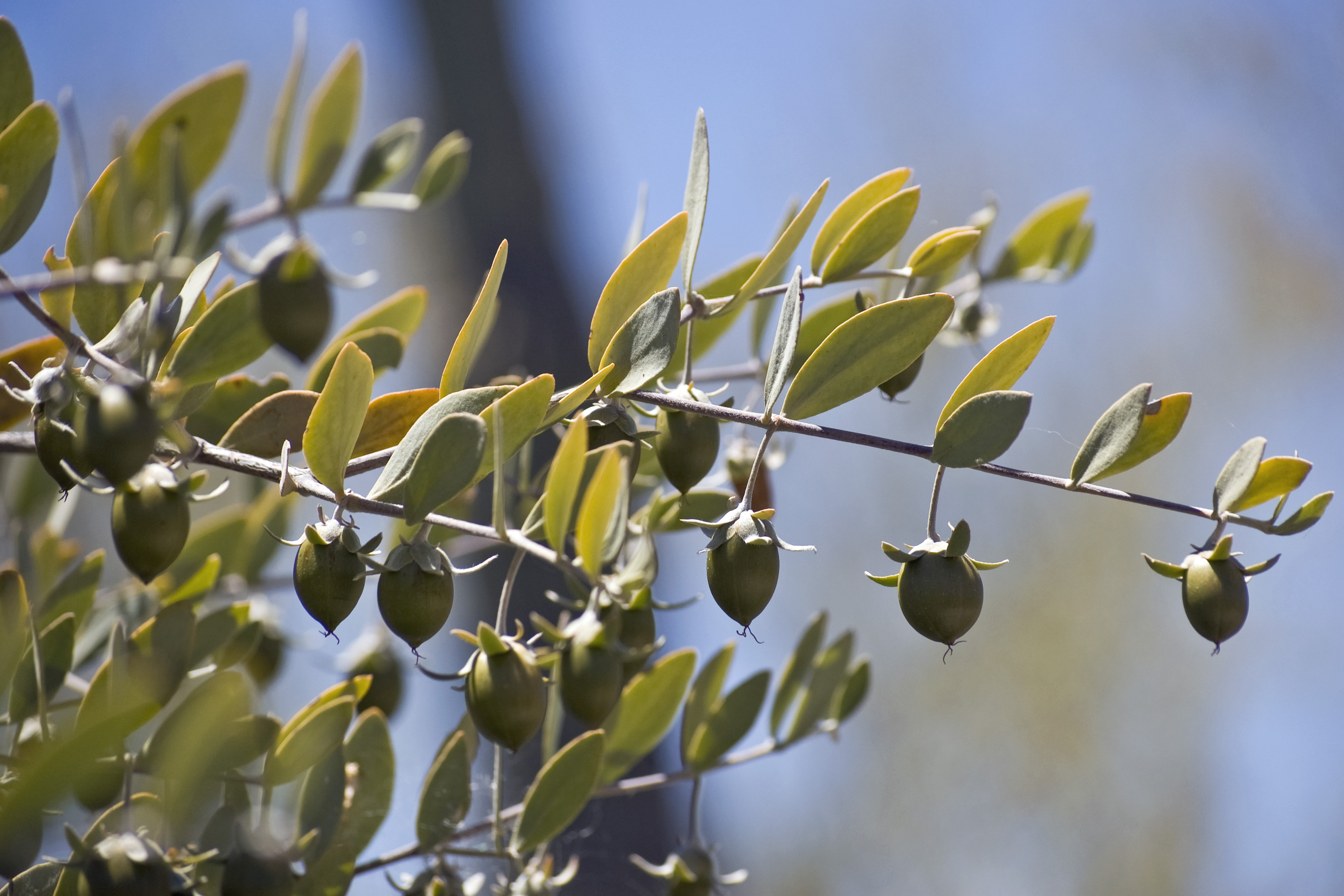
Jojoba fruits

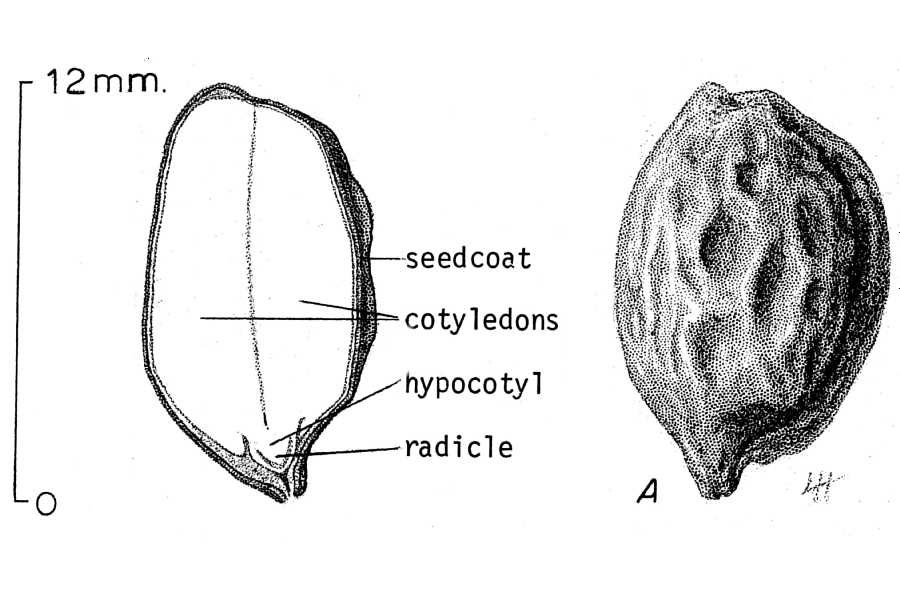
Jojoba seed

== Genetics ==
The jojoba genome was sequenced in 2020 and reported to be 887 Mb, consisting of 26 chromosomes and is predicted to have 23,490 protein-coding genes. Somatic cells of jojoba are tetraploid; the number of chromosomes is 2n = 4x = 52.

=== Taxonomy ===
Despite its scientific name Simmondsia chinensis, the plant is not native to China. The botanist Johann Link originally named the species Buxus chinensis, after misreading a collection label "Calif", referring to California, as "China". Jojoba was collected again in 1836 by Thomas Nuttall who described it as a new genus and species in 1844, naming it Simmondsia californica, but priority rules require that the original specific epithet be used.

In the Cronquist system, the family was placed in Euphorbiales, whereas in the APG system, it is placed in Caryophyllales.

== Production ==
The United States is the largest producer of jojoba oil, followed by Mexico. Due to its economic potential, the plant has been cultivated for over 30 years in several countries. Jojoba oil production has increased significantly and is expected to continue growing due to rising demand, particularly in the cosmetics and pharmaceutical industries.

Jojoba has no significance in the global food system, as it is a non-edible plant with no human nutritional value. Various cultivars such as 'Benzioni' and 'Hazerim' are available, known for their high yields.

== Uses ==
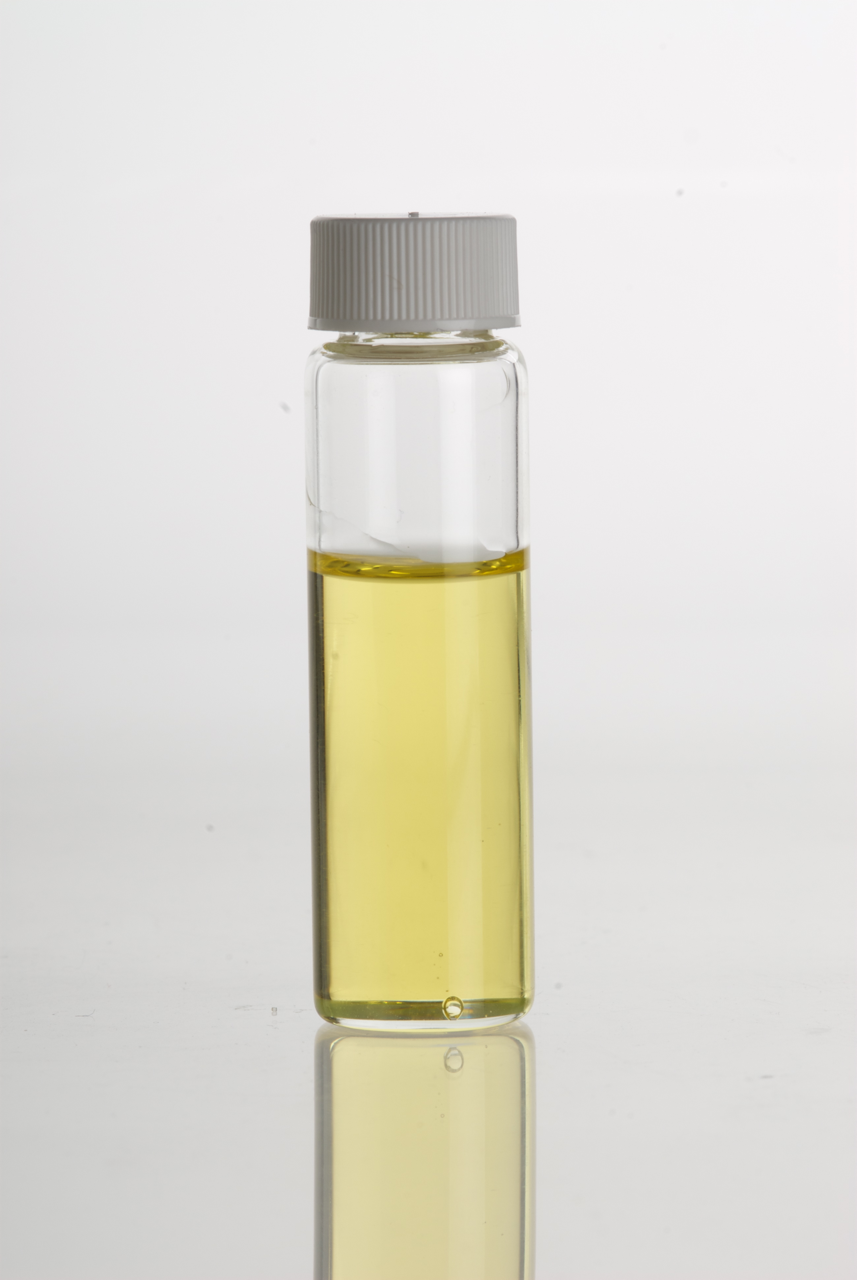
Jojoba oil in a clear glass vial

Jojoba foliage provides year-round food for many animals, including deer, javelina, bighorn sheep, and livestock. Its seeds are eaten by squirrels, rabbits, other rodents, and larger birds.

Only Bailey's pocket mouse, however, is known to be able to digest the wax found inside the jojoba seed. In large quantities, jojoba seed meal is toxic to many mammals. Later this effect was found to be due to simmondsin, which inhibits hunger. The indigestible wax acts as a laxative in humans.

Consistent use of jojoba oil is thought to help regulate the skin's oil production. Additionally, it has a longer shelf life than other natural oils, making it a durable ingredient in skincare products. Medically, jojoba oil can relieve headaches, throat inflammation, and treat wounds. It has anti-inflammatory, antimicrobial, antifungal, and insecticidal properties. After oil extraction, the leftover jojoba meal can be used as a low-cost livestock feed. Jojoba leaves also contain antioxidant flavonoids, which have been studied for their potential in treating asthma, inflammation, and cancer.

=== Native American uses ===
Native Americans first made use of jojoba. During the early 18th century Jesuit missionaries on the Baja California Peninsula observed indigenous peoples heating jojoba seeds to soften them. They then used a mortar and pestle to create a salve or buttery substance. The latter was applied to the skin and hair to heal and condition. The O'odham people of the Sonoran Desert treated burns with an antioxidant salve made from a paste of the jojoba seed.

Native Americans also used the salve to soften and preserve animal hides. Pregnant women ate jojoba seeds, believing they assisted during childbirth. Hunters and raiders ate jojoba on the trail to keep hunger at bay.

The Seri, who utilize nearly every edible plant in their domain, do not regard the seeds as real food and in the past ate it only in emergencies.

=== Introduction to Europe ===
Archibald Menzies was the botanist with the Vancouver Expedition that arrived in Santa Barbara, California, in November 1793. He was given fruit and plants of the jojoba by padre of the San Diego Mission. These survived the voyage back to the UK and were planted in the Royal Botanic Gardens at Kew near London.

=== Contemporary uses ===
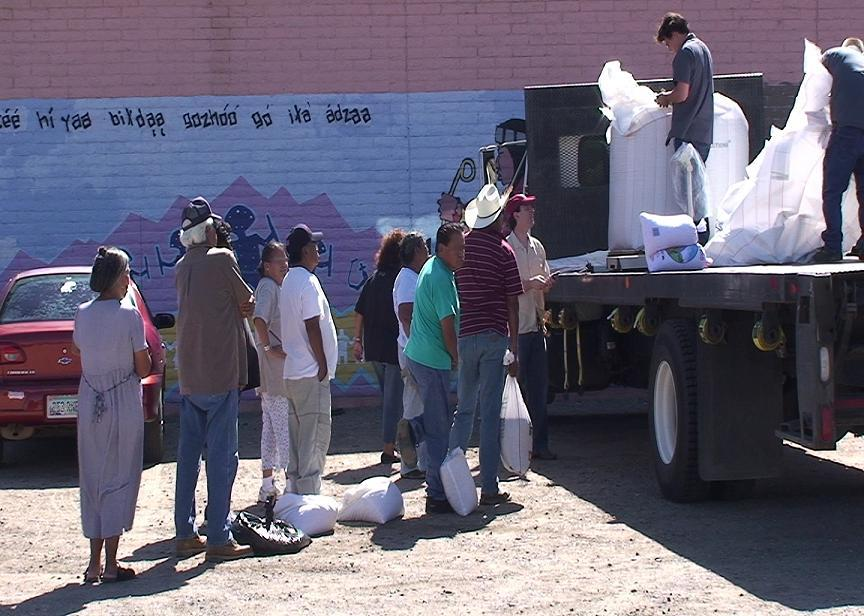
Wild jojoba seed market on the San Carlos Apache Indian Reservation in Arizona

Jojoba is grown for the liquid wax, commonly called jojoba oil, in its seeds. The oil is rare in that it is an extremely long (C36–C46) straight-chain wax ester and not a triglyceride, making jojoba and its derivative jojoba esters more similar to whale oil than to traditional vegetable oils. Jojoba oil has also been discussed as a possible biodiesel fuel, but it cannot be cultivated on a scale to compete with traditional fossil fuels, so its use is restricted to personal care products.

=== Cultivation ===
Plantations of jojoba have been established in a number of desert and semi-desert areas, predominantly in Argentina, Australia, Israel, Mexico, Peru and the United States. It is currently the Sonoran Desert's second most economically valuable native plant (overshadowed only by Washingtonia filifera—California fan palms, used as ornamental trees).

Jojoba prefers light, coarsely textured soils. Good drainage and water penetration is necessary. It tolerates salinity and nutrient-poor soils. Soil pH should be between 5 and 8. Jojoba grows best in young, coarse soils with minimal profile development. These soils, primarily derived from acid igneous materials, are typically found on slopes exceeding 3 up to over 30 percent. On north-facing slopes, the moisture retention is often better and thus can better support jojoba, especially young plants.

High temperatures are tolerated by jojoba, but frost can damage or kill plants. Jojoba can endure extreme temperature, with summer temperatures up to 46 °C (115 °F). However, they can on the other hand experience leaf damage in cold conditions. The seedlings are more vulnerable, suffering damage or death at temperatures between three and nine degrees below freezing. Factors such as drought, freezing conditions, and biotic pressures can significantly impact seedling survival. Jojoba thrives at various elevations, ranging from sea level to lower mountain slopes. In Arizona's Sonoran Desert, it is commonly found between 600 and 1,300 m (2,000 and 4,300 ft). This elevation range provides an ideal environment for jojoba, characterized by well-drained, dry slopes or along wadis, where water runoff can support plant growth.

Requirements are minimal, so jojoba plants do not need intensive cultivation. Weed problems only occur during the first two years after planting and there is little damage by insects.

Jojoba is well-suited for areas with low annual precipitation, typically flourishing where it exceeds 355 mm (14 in) annually. But it is possible to grow and survive for jojoba with a precipitation below 100mm. The optimal range for precipitation is between 450 and 500 mm (18 and 20 in), which provides the necessary moisture for growth. But during the seed development a sufficient water availability is necessary. Supplemental irrigation could maximize production where rainfall is less than 400 mm (16 in). There is no need for high fertilisation, but, especially in the first year, nitrogen increases growth. Jojoba is normally harvested by hand because seeds do not all mature in the same time. Yield is around 3.5 tonnes per hectare (3,100 lb/acre) depending on the age of the plantation.

Selective breeding is developing plants that produce more beans with higher wax content, as well as other characteristics that will facilitate harvesting.

Farmers can establish jojoba plantations by selecting appropriate elevations and managing water resources. Due to its high product value and tolerance to soil salinity up to 12 dS·m⁻¹ at pH 9, the crop is cultivated in arid regions for commercial oil production and desertification control. For example, jojoba has been planted to prevent desertification in the Thar Desert in India.[1][2]

Research continues on options to further increase yields. There are already findings on the types of pruning techniques for the bushes, which are expected to make a difference in yields.

== Processing technology ==
Jojoba oil is traditionally extracted by mechanically pressing the seeds, often with the use of hexane to maximize yield, resulting in a typical oil extraction of 35–43%. Other methods using organic solvents like chloroform or isopropanol can increase the yield to up to 55%.

A more environmentally friendly, but more expensive, method is supercritical CO_{2} extraction. This method can be enhanced by adding co-solvents such as ethanol.

Transesterification is used to convert jojoba oil into biodiesel, where the oil reacts with alcohol (e.g., methanol) in the presence of a catalyst (e.g., sodium hydroxide). Both homogeneous and heterogeneous catalysts can be used, as well as enzymatic catalysts, which are more environmentally friendly but costlier.

== Molecular breeding ==
Jojoba is a dioecious plant, which brings one of its main challenges. Only the female bushes bear seeds that can be used for jojoba oil production. The sex of the plant is only visible to the eye after flowering (3-4 years after planting). A proportion of 10% male plants is required in a field for efficient production. About 50% of the plants grown from seed are male. This genetic heterogeneity makes commercial cultivation questionable. Therefore, vegetative propagation is preferred to ensure homogeneous and high-yielding genotypes. To differentiate between male and female plants, several molecular markers have been developed.

Agrawal et al. (2007) identified the sex-specific random amplification of polymorphic DNA genetic marker OPG-5, a base segment of 1400 bp, which only occurs in male plants. Agarwal et al. (2011) found additional markers at approximately 525 bp and 325 bp, specific to male plants, using the amplified fragment length polymorphism method and the primers EcoRI-GC/MseI-GCG and EcoRI-TAC/MseI-GCG. Additionally, a female-specific marker was found at approximately 270 bp with the primers EcoRI-TAC/MseI-GCG. Gender-specific microsatellite markers were also discovered.

Over the past two decades, a number of genetic marker have been developed that help determine the sex of the plant, thereby reducing the risk for farmers by ensuring more accurate propagation of female plants.
