= Lipstick =

Cosmetic for coloring the lip

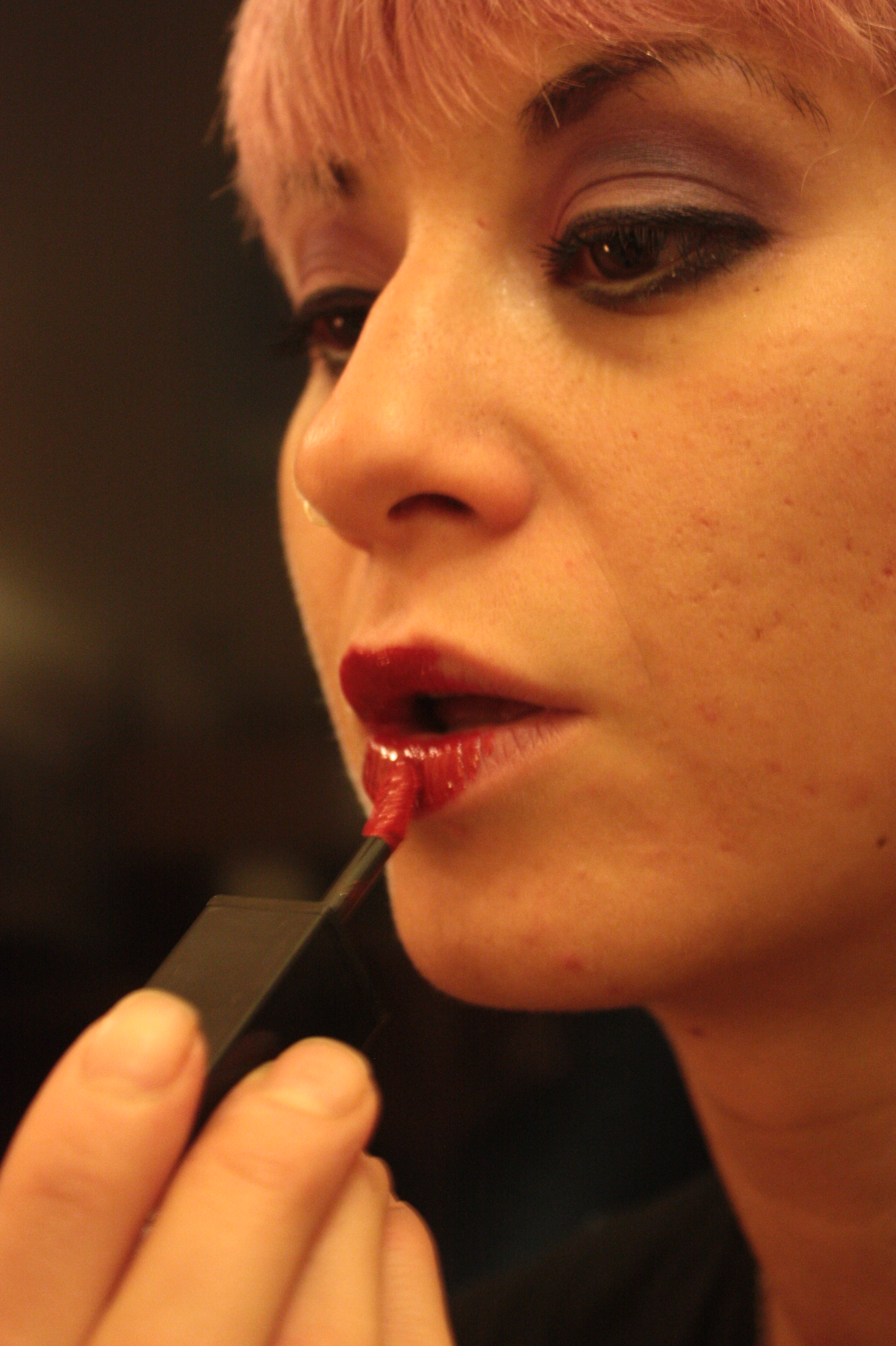
A woman applying red lipstick

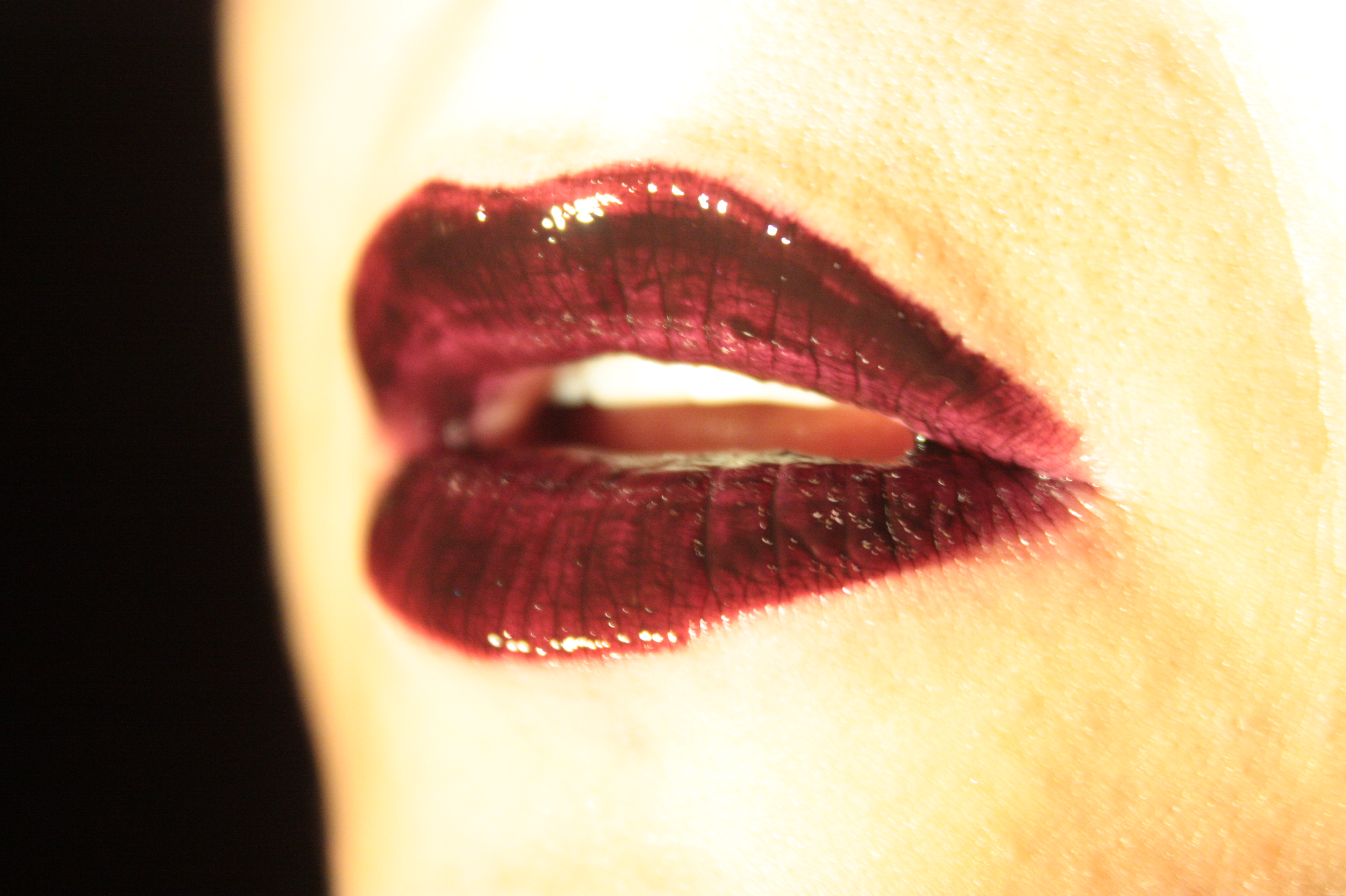
Lips with dark crimson lipstick

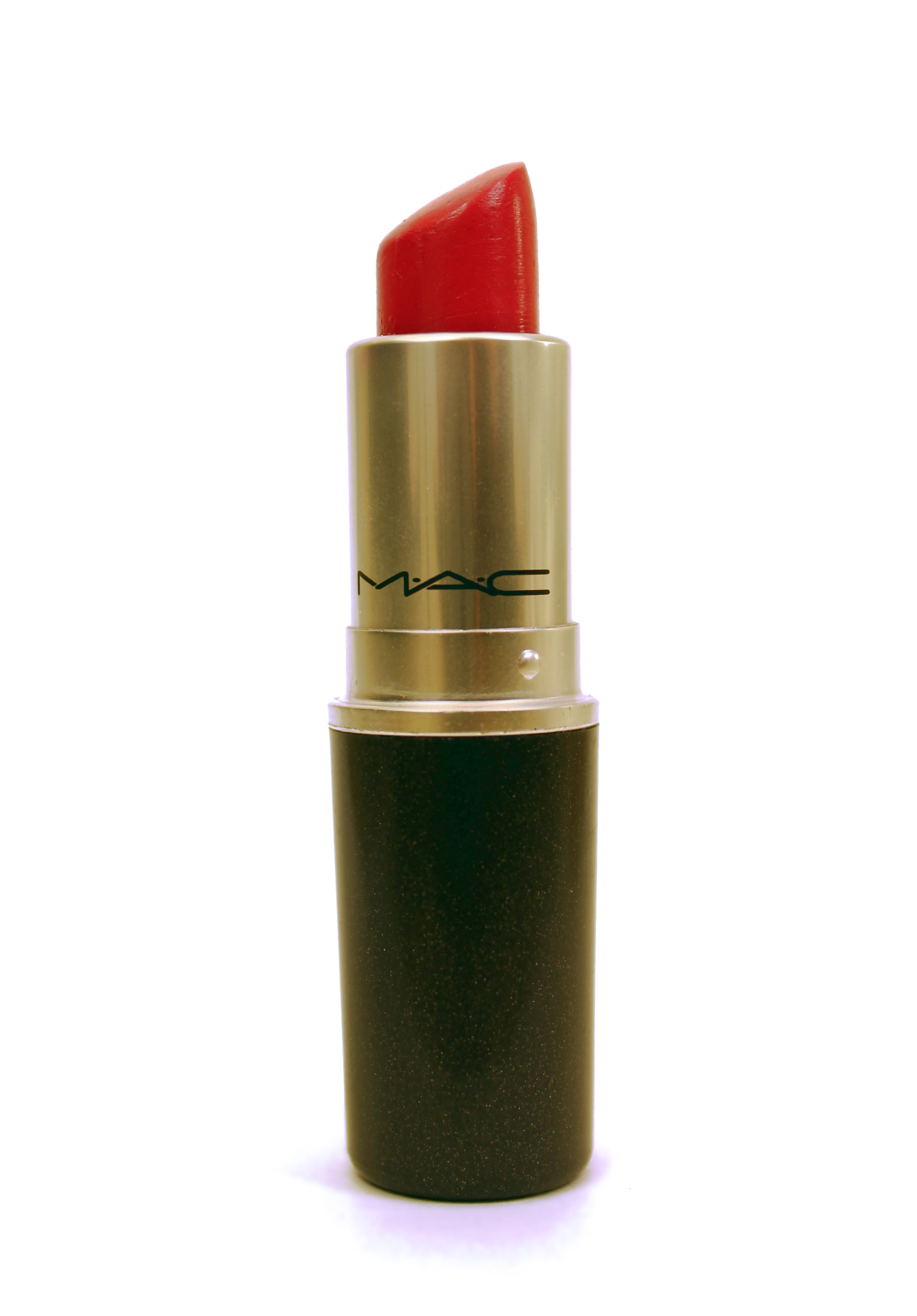
A tube of red lipstick

Lipstick is a cosmetic product used to apply color and texture to lips, often made of wax and oil. Different pigments are used to produce color, and minerals such as silica may be used to provide texture. The use of lipstick dates back to early civilizations such as Sumer and the Indus Valley Civilisation, and was popularized in the Western world in the 16th century. Some lipsticks contain traces of toxic materials, such as lead and PFAS, which prompted health concerns and regulation.

Lipstick has been prominent in several women's fashion trends, often associated with women's sexuality. The color of lipstick has aesthetic and cultural significance, as different colors carry different connotations. Red lipstick has historically been associated with sensuality or women's independence, while black lipstick is worn by both men and women in alternative subcultures, especially punk and goth. Celebrities such as Marilyn Monroe, Elizabeth Taylor, Madonna, and Taylor Swift have contributed to the popularity and iconic images of lipstick in fashion and mainstream media.

== History ==
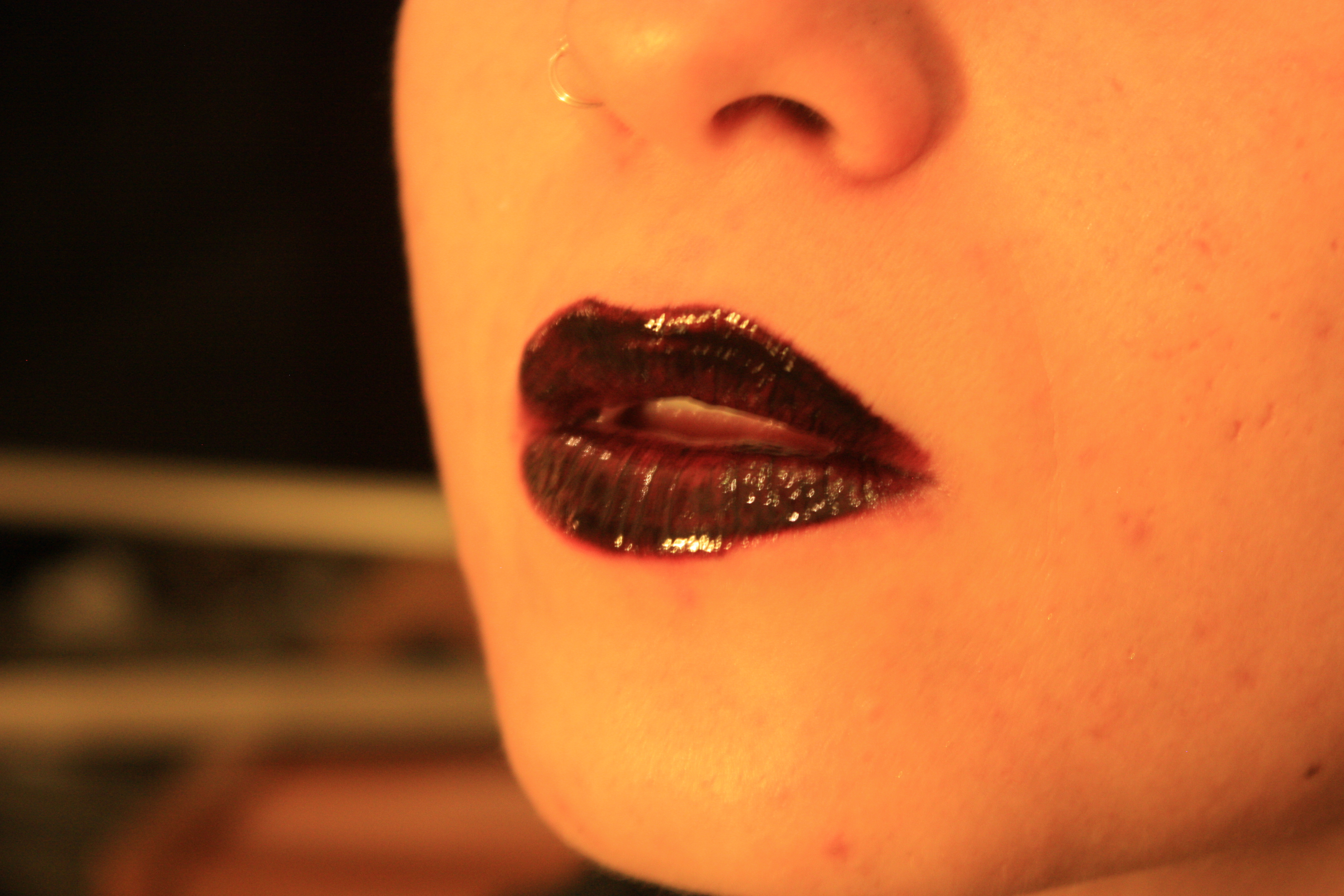
Black lipstick

=== Early history ===
Ancient Sumerian and Indus Valley men and women were possibly the first to invent and wear lipstick, about 5,000 years ago. Sumerians crushed gemstones and used them to decorate their faces, mainly on the lips and around the eyes. Women in the ancient Indus Valley civilization have used rectangular pieces of ochre with beveled ends as lipstick. The Kama Sutra describes lip coloring made of red lac and beeswax and the method how it was used. Ancient Egyptians wore lipstick to show social status rather than gender. They extracted the red dye from fucus-algin, 0.01 % iodine, and some bromine mannite, but this dye resulted in serious illness. Lipsticks with shimmering effects were initially made using a pearlescent substance found in fish scales.

The Chinese made lipsticks that were made from beeswax more than 1,000 years ago to protect the delicate skin of the lips. During the Tang dynasty (618–907 CE), scented oils were added to them, which gave the mouth an enticing factor.

In Australia, Aboriginal girls would paint their mouths red with ochre for puberty rituals.

=== United Kingdom and France ===
Lip colouring started to gain some popularity in 16th-century England. During the time of Queen Elizabeth I bright red lips and a stark white face became fashionable. At that time, lipstick was made from a blend of beeswax and red stains from plants. Only upper-class women and male actors wore makeup. Throughout most of the 19th century, the obvious use of cosmetics was not considered acceptable in Britain for respectable women, and it was associated with marginalised groups such as actors and prostitutes. It was considered brazen and uncouth to wear makeup. In the 1850s, reports were being published warning women of the dangers of using lead and vermilion in cosmetics applied to the face. The first lipstick was created by Parisian Maison Guerlain in 1870. The invention of waxy lip cosmetics as sticks was inspired by candlemaking techniques, leading Guerlain to manufacture lipstick on a wider scale by the late 19th century. An employee of Aime and Gabriel Guerlain was walking in a street and happened upon the store of a candlemaker, whose wax and colored pigments gave him a eureka moment. Seeing the candlemaker's tools gave the Guerlain employee the “mad” idea of creating a waxy lip cosmetic as a stick. By the end of the 19th century, Guerlain began to manufacture lipstick on a wider scale. The first commercial lipstick was invented in 1884, by them in Paris, France. It was covered in silk paper and made from deer tallow, castor oil, and beeswax. Before this, lipstick had been created at home.

Complete acceptance of the undisguised use of cosmetics in England appears to have arrived for the fashionable Londoner at least by 1921.

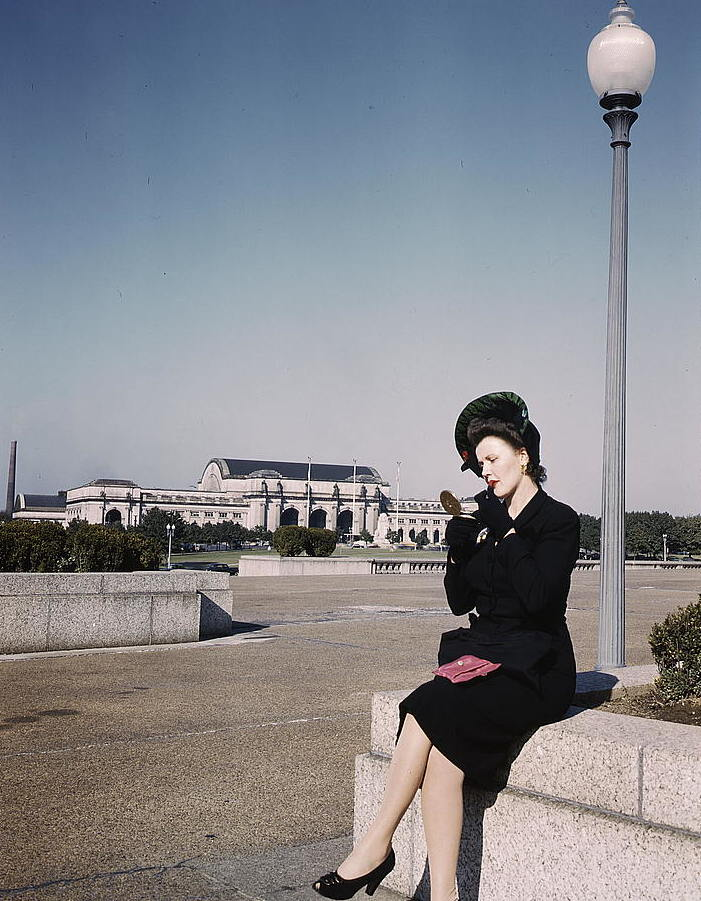
Woman applying lipstick with a compact in Washington D.C., 1943

=== United States ===
In the 19th century, lipstick was colored with carmine dye. Carmine dye was extracted from cochineal, scale insects native to Mexico and Central America which live on cactus plants. Cochineal insects produce carminic acid to deter predation by other insects. Carminic acid, which forms 17% to 24% of the weight of the dried insects, can be extracted from the insects' bodies and eggs. Mixed with aluminum or calcium salts, it makes carmine dye (also known as cochineal).

This lipstick did not come in a tube; it was applied with a brush. Carmine dye was expensive, and the look of carmine colored lipstick was considered unnatural and theatrical, so lipstick was frowned upon for everyday wear. Only actors and actresses could get away with wearing lipstick. In 1880, few stage actresses wore lipstick in public. The famous actress, Sarah Bernhardt, began wearing lipstick and rouge in public. Before the late 19th century, women only applied makeup at home. Bernhardt often applied carmine dye to her lips in public.

In the early 1890s, carmine was mixed with an oil and wax base. The mixture gave a natural look and it was more acceptable among women. At that time, lipstick was not sold in screw up metal tube; it was sold in paper tubes, tinted papers, or in small pots. The Sears Roebuck catalog first offered rouge for lips and cheeks by the late 1890s.

By 1912, fashionable American women had come to consider lipstick acceptable, though an article in the New York Times advised on the need to apply it cautiously.

By 1915, lipstick was sold in metal cylinder containers. Women had to slide a tiny lever at the side of the tube with the edge of their fingernail to move the lipstick up to the top of the case, although lipsticks in push-up metal containers had been available in Europe since 1911. In 1923, the first swivel-up tube was patented by James Bruce Mason Jr. in Nashville, Tennessee. As women started to wear lipstick for photographs, photography made lipstick acceptable among women. Elizabeth Arden and Estee Lauder began selling lipstick in their salons.

During the Second World War, metal lipstick tubes were replaced by plastic and paper tubes. Lipstick was scarce during that time because some of the essential ingredients of lipstick, petroleum and castor oil, were unavailable. World War II allowed women to work in engineering and scientific research, and in the late 1940s, Hazel Bishop, an organic chemist in New York and New Jersey, created the first long lasting lipstick, called No-Smear lipstick. With the help of Raymond Specter, an advertiser, Bishop's lipstick business thrived.

== Lipstick trends ==
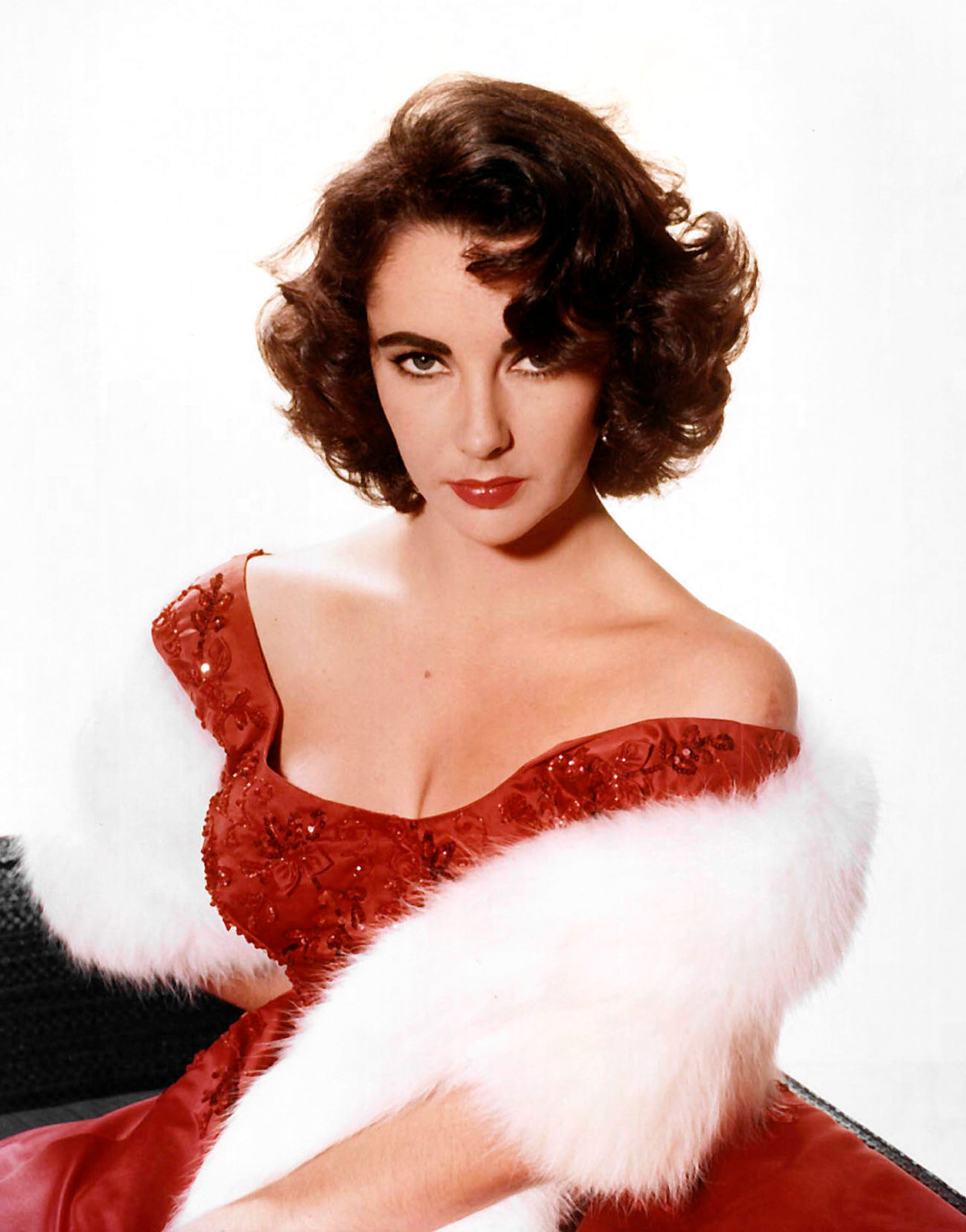
Elizabeth Taylor helped popularize red lipstick.

Throughout the early 20th century, lipstick came in a limited number of shades. Dark red lipstick was one of the most popular shades throughout the 19th and 20th centuries, especially in the 1920s. Flappers wore lipstick to symbolize their independence. Lipstick was worn around the lips to form a "Cupid's bow," inspired by actress Clara Bow. At that time, it was acceptable to apply lipstick in public and during lunch, but never at dinner.

In the early 1930s, Elizabeth Arden began to introduce different lipstick colors. She inspired other companies to create a variety of lipstick shades. In the 1930s, lipstick was seen as a symbol of adult sexuality. Teenage girls believed that lipstick was a symbol of womanhood, yet adults saw it as an act of rebellion. Many Americans, especially immigrants, did not accept teenage girls wearing lipstick. A 1937 survey revealed that over 50% of teenage girls fought with their parents over lipstick.

In the mid-1940s, several teen books and magazines stressed that men prefer a natural look over a made-up look. Books and magazines also warned girls that wearing cosmetics could ruin their chances of popularity and a career. The implication of these articles was that lipstick and rouge were for teen girls who acted very provocatively with men. Teen girls were discouraged from wearing cosmetics for fear that they would be mistaken for "loose" girls or prostitutes.

By the 1950s, movie actresses Marilyn Monroe and Elizabeth Taylor helped bring back dark red lips. A 1951 survey revealed that two-thirds of teenage girls wore lipstick.

In 1950, a chemist named Hazel Bishop formed a company, Hazel Bishop Inc., to promote her invention of long-lasting, non-smearing 'kissproof' lipstick ("stays on you... not on him"), which quickly gained acceptance. At the end of the 1950s, a cosmetic company named Gala introduced pale shimmery lipstick. Later, Max Factor created a popular lipstick color called Strawberry Meringue. Lipstick manufacturers began creating lipsticks in lavender, pale pink, white, and peach. Since parents generally frowned on teen girls wearing red lipstick, some teen girls began wearing pink and peach lipsticks, which became a trend. White or nearly white lipstick was popular in the 1960s. Rock groups such as the Ronettes and The Shirelles popularized white lipstick. Girls would apply white lipstick over pink lipstick or place under-eye concealer on their lips. During that time, many lipsticks were either matte, sheer, or slightly shiny. In the 1960s, lipstick was associated with femininity. Women who did not wear lipstick were suspected of mental illness or lesbianism.

In the 1970s, a number of cosmetic companies introduced lipsticks in more unusual colors such as iridescent light blue (Kanebo), frosted lime green (Conga Lime by Revlon), and silver sparkled navy blue (Metallic Grandma by Biba). M•A•C cosmetics continues to release limited edition and highly collectible lipsticks in a wide range of colors and finishes, including unusual hues of violets, blues, and greens.

Black lipstick became popular in the late 1970s and into the 1990s. In the 1950s, black lipstick was worn by actresses starring in horror films. It became popular again due in part to punk and goth subcultures.

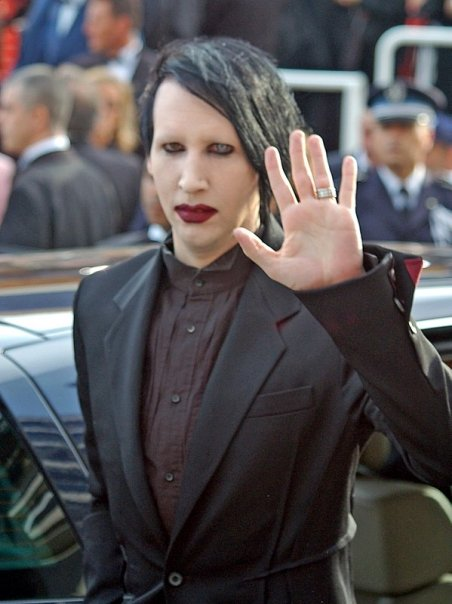
Marilyn Manson helped popularize dark lipsticks in alternative subcultures.

In the mid-1980s, so-called mood lipstick, akin to mood rings, was sold to adults by mainstream cosmetic companies. This type of lipstick changes colors after it is applied, based on changes in the skin's pH that supposedly reflect the wearer's mood. Previously these had been available as little girls' play makeup. They had another resurgence in the very early 21st century, offered by inexpensive as well as more exclusive cosmetic lines, and color changing chemicals also appeared in lip gloss, such as Smashbox O-Gloss, and blush, such as Stila Custom Color Blush.

In the 1990s, lipstick colors became semi-matte. Shades of brown were very popular. These shades were inspired by several shows, such as Friends. In the late 1990s and into the 21st century, pearl shades became very popular. Lipsticks were no longer matte or semi-matte but were shiny.

In the 1990s, Laura Mercier ("M") and MAC Cosmetics ("Russian Red") created red lipsticks for Madonna. Author Poppy King believes that Madonna "ushered red lipstick back in as a symbol of strength" and of "glamorous rebellion". Upon its release the "Russian Red" became a bestseller, and still one of the best-selling lipsticks of MAC according to an article published in 2020 by Vogue Spain. In 2012, Make Up For Ever created the "Aqua Rouge/Iconic Red" (shade #8) for Madonna to wear on her the MDNA Tour, and celebrities like Taylor Swift used it according to fashion-targeted magazines such as Elle.

Another form of lip color, a wax-free, semi-permanent liquid formula, was invented in the 1990s by the Lip-Ink International company. Other companies have imitated the idea, putting out their own versions of long-lasting lip stain or "liquid lip color", usually in form of a liquid or gel. It generally stays on longer than lipstick by leaving a stain of color on the lips.

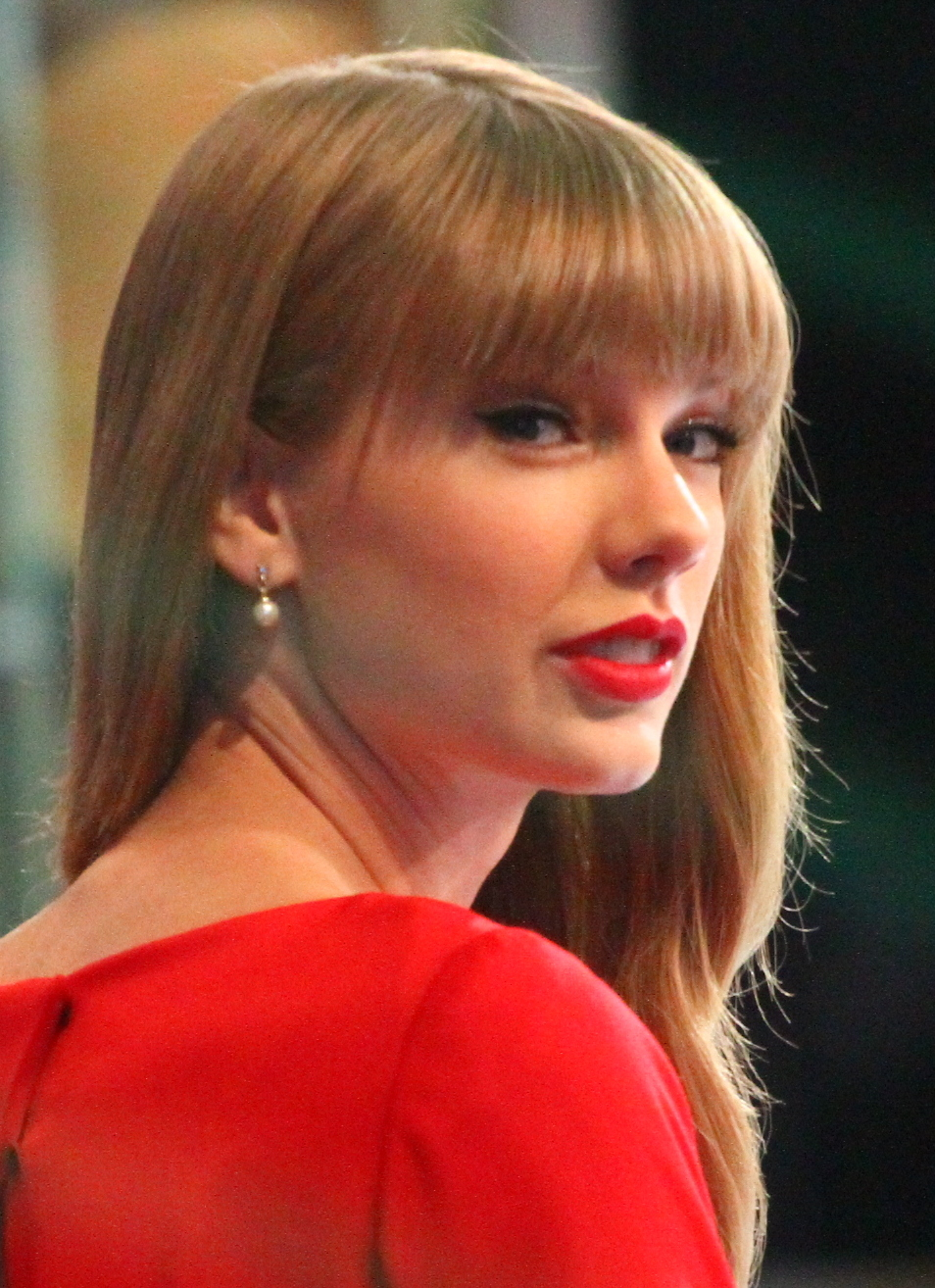
Taylor Swift with her signature red lips on Good Morning America in 2012

In 2012, bright, bold lip colors became trendy again with saturated colors such as hot pink, neon, and orange. American singer-songwriter Taylor Swift boosted the popularity of red lipsticks, especially with the release of her fourth studio album, Red (2012), whose cover artwork prominently features red lips. Swift has since worn red lipstick consistently. Media outlets consider red lips as one of her signature looks, coupled with the "desirable" cupid's bow and "voluptuous" pout of her lips.

In 2014 and early 2015, nude lipsticks became popular. These lipsticks follow the general trend where "less is more". Examples of celebrities promoting this trend are Paris Hilton and Gigi Gorgeous. In late 2015 and 2016, liquid lipstick, which applies like a gloss but dries matte, became popularized with brands such as Anastasia Beverly Hills, Sephora, Huda Beauty, Kylie Cosmetics, NYX Cosmetics. Its most common form comes in a tube, applied with an applicator wand. Liquid lipstick tends to have more staying power and is more opaque than traditional lipstick. However, it dries out more and cracks more readily over time, depending upon the product quality.

In early 2019, before the COVID-19 pandemic, the trend of liquid lipstick was changed from the liquid matte lipstick to semi-matte or glossy finish. However, the COVID-19 pandemic markedly reduced the popularity of lipsticks since people usually do not apply lipstick under a facial mask.

Lipstick also has many variations, including liquid, lip balms, glosses, crayons, pencils, liners, palettes, and stains. Balms and glosses tend to be more translucent and not as dark or vibrant as regular lipsticks. Some individuals buy lip balms and glosses rather than lipstick, as they get a more hydrating feeling from these.

== Significance in sexuality ==
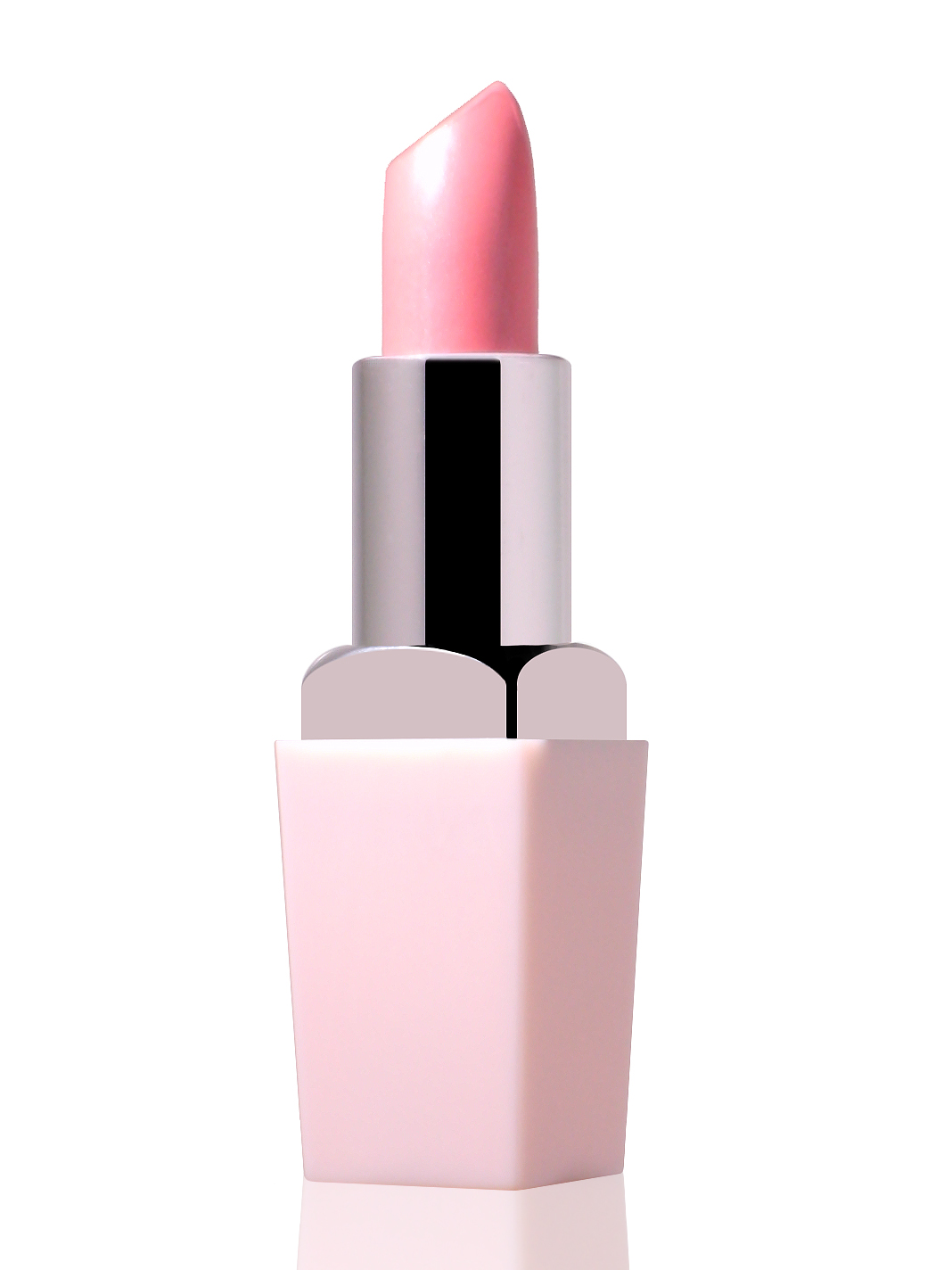
A tube of pink lipstick

A "lipstick lesbian" is a female who is attracted to other females, but remains stereotypically feminine and has a “girly” identity, sometimes known as a "femme". The term "lipstick lesbian" became popular when used by writer Deborah Bergman, a reporter for the Los Angeles Times.

== Ingredients ==
Lipstick contains wax, oils, antioxidants, and emollients. Wax provides structure to solid lipstick. Lipsticks may be made from several waxes such as beeswax, ozokerite, and candelilla wax. Because of its high melting point, carnauba wax is a key ingredient in terms of strengthening the lipstick. Various oils and fats are used in lipsticks, such as olive oil, mineral oil, cocoa butter, lanolin, and petrolatum.

Lipsticks get their colors from a variety of pigments and lake dyes including, but not limited to bromo acid, D&C Red No. 21, Calcium Lake such as D&C Red 7 and D&C Red 34, and D&C Orange No. 17. Pink lipsticks are made by mixing white titanium dioxide and red shades. Both organic and inorganic pigments are employed.

Matte lipsticks contain more filling agents like silica but do not have many emollients. Creme lipsticks contain more waxes than oils. Sheer and long lasting lipsticks contain more oil, while long lasting lipsticks also contain silicone oil, which seals the colors to the wearer's lips. Glossy lipstick contains more oil to give a shiny finish to the lips.

Shimmery or frost lipstick may contain mica, silica, and synthetic pearl particles, such as bismuth oxychloride, to give them a glittery or shimmering shine.

Lipstick is made from grinding and heating ingredients. Then heated waxes are added to the mix for texture. Oils and lanolin are added for specific formula requirements. Afterwards, the hot liquid is poured into a metal mold. The mixture is then chilled. Once they have hardened, they are heated in flame for half a second to create a shiny finish and to remove imperfections.

== Safety ==
=== Lead traces ===
Lead and other trace metals may be found in many lipsticks; these occur naturally and can accidentally contaminate other ingredients during production. As contaminants are not added intentionally they will not be listed as ingredients.

In 2007, a study by the Campaign for Safe Cosmetics released a report called "A Poison Kiss" that tested 33 popular brands of lipstick for lead content. The study found that 61 percent of lipsticks contained lead with levels up to 0.65 parts per million (ppm). The study raised public awareness of the issue, putting pressure on the FDA to conduct further studies using a specialized testing method. In 2009, the FDA released the follow-up study to the Campaign for Safe Cosmetics' report, which found lead was present in all 20 samples tested. The lead levels ranged from 0.09 to 3.06 ppm, with the highest levels found in lipsticks made by Cover Girl, L'Oreal, and Revlon.

In 2011, the FDA conducted an expanded survey on its previous study, which broadened the testing to 400 lipsticks that were available on the U.S. market at the time. This study was performed by Frontier Global Sciences, Inc. using the same testing method as 2009. This study found an average of 1.11 ppm compared to the 1.07 ppm average in the 2009 study, while the highest amount of 7.19 ppm in Maybelline's Color Sensational 125 – Pink Petal. This was more than twice the highest amount found in the 2009 study.

Trace amounts of lead can contaminate raw ingredients, specifically mineral based additives, as this element occurs naturally in soil, water, and air. The Campaign for Safe Cosmetics made a list of chemicals for concern which can contain toxic chemicals such as lead.

Whilst only trace amounts of lead are ingested from lipstick, lead accumulates in the body over time, which can eventually lead to lead poisoning. The most common users of lipstick are teens and adult women, and a study performed by the University of California, Berkeley found that women applied lipstick anywhere from two to fourteen times a day. This translates to up to 87 milligrams of product ingestion per day. Lead ingestion is particularly concerning for pregnant women because lead can enter the fetus from the mother.

The FDA is the regulating body of cosmetic safety under the U.S. FD&C Act. Cosmetics regulated by the FD&C Act do not need to be approved for pre-market sale, but pre-market approval is required for any color additives used in lipsticks. Currently, the FDA has not set an acceptable lead limit level for lipsticks specifically, but it has set specifications for lead in the color additives used in lipstick. The FDA's maximum lead limit level is 20 parts per million in cosmetics; however, since lipstick is absorbed through the skin and only ingested in very small quantities, the FDA does not "consider the lead levels we found in the lipsticks to be a safety concern". The CDC, on the other hand, reports that there is no safe blood level for lead and that its presence, even at low levels, can affect IQ, the ability to pay attention, and academic achievement. Once present, the effects of lead exposure on the body cannot be reversed.

=== Per- and polyfluoroalkyl substances (PFAS) ===
A 2021 study tested 231 makeup and personal care products and found organic fluorine, an indicator of PFAS, in more than half of the samples. High levels of fluorine were most commonly identified in waterproof mascara (82% of brands tested), foundations (63%), and liquid lipstick (62%). As many as 13 types of individual PFAS compounds were found in each product. Since PFAS compounds are highly mobile, they are readily absorbed through human skin and through tear ducts, and such products on lips are often unwittingly ingested. Manufacturers often fail to label their products as containing PFAS, which makes it difficult for cosmetics consumers to avoid products containing PFAS.

== In forensic science ==
Traces of lipstick, cosmetics, nail polish, or other "smears" could be found left on drinking cups, glasses, cigarette butts, and tissue papers and may all be significant forensic evidence in the investigation of a crime, especially in cases such as sexual assault, homicide, and in government- or corporate-related corruption and controversies.

Lipstick, as a physical evidence, may be found on clothing, parts of the victim's or perpetrator's body, a tissue, a cigarette, etc. By comparing the composition of a lipstick smear with that of a victim or a witness, forensic scientists can demonstrate direct or indirect proof of contact or a relationship between the plaintiff and the defendant. Also, it is sometimes possible to extract saliva DNA from the lipstick print which might link a suspect to their presence at the crime scene.

Various other methods of forensic lipstick analysis are used, such as thin layer or gas chromatography, and spectroscopy and chemometrics.

== See also ==
- Lip augmentation
- Lip balm
- Lip gloss
- Lip liner
- Lip plumper
- Lipstick effect – Economic theory
- Lipstick feminism – Feminism that maintains femininity and sexuality of women
- Lipstick lesbian – Slang for a stereotypically feminine lesbian
