= Jojoba oil =

Oil extracted from jojoba seeds

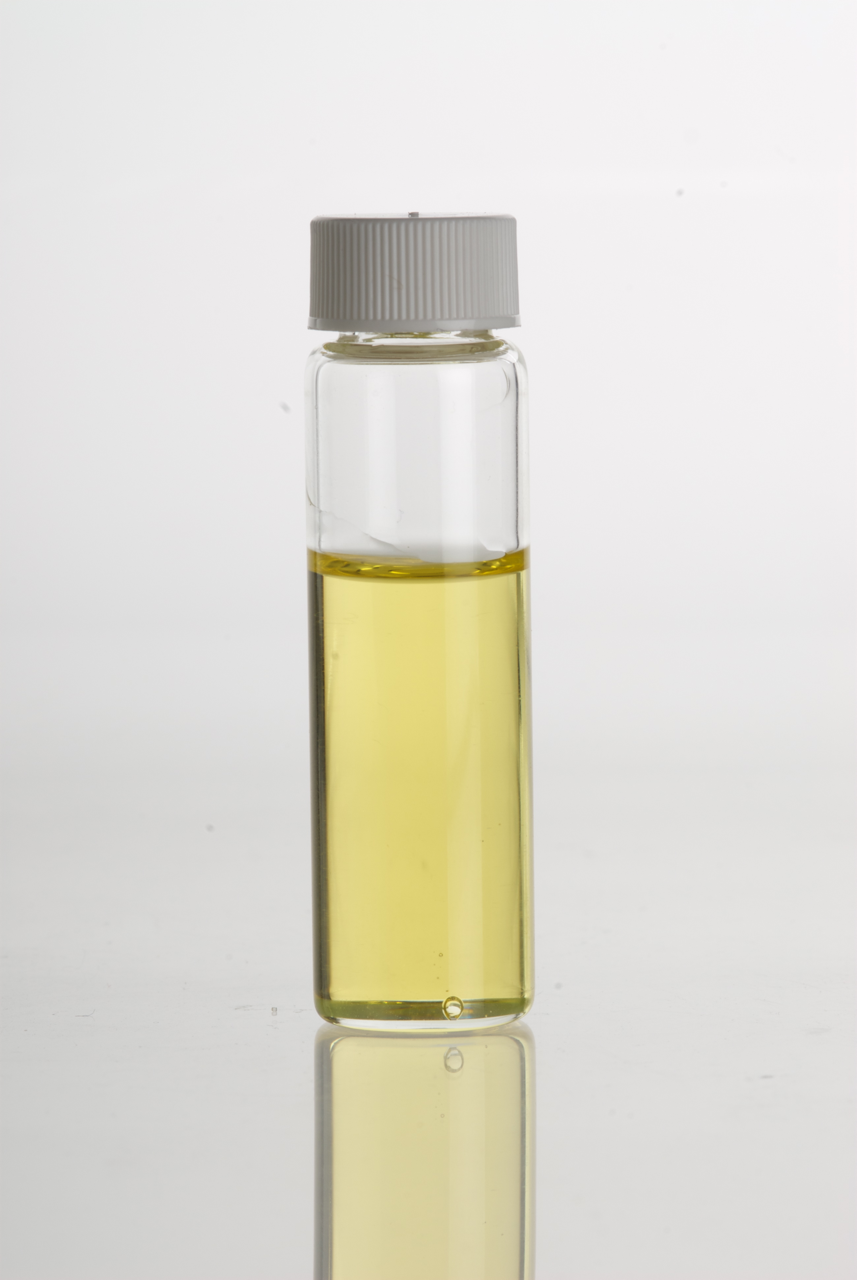
Glass vial containing jojoba oil

Jojoba oil (/həˈhoʊbə/) is the liquid produced in the seed of the jojoba plant (Simmondsia chinensis), a shrub which is native to southern Arizona, southern California, and northwestern Mexico. The oil makes up approximately 50% of the jojoba seed by weight. The terms "jojoba oil" and "jojoba wax" are often used interchangeably because the wax visually appears to be a mobile oil, but as a wax it is composed almost entirely (~97%) of mono-esters of long-chain fatty acids (wax ester) and alcohols (isopropyl jojobate), accompanied by only a tiny fraction of triglyceride esters. This composition accounts for its extreme shelf-life stability and extraordinary resistance to high temperatures, compared with true vegetable oils.

== History ==
The O'odham Native American tribe extracted the oil from jojoba seeds to treat sores and wounds. The collection and processing of the seed from naturally occurring stands marked the beginning of jojoba domestication in the early 1970s.

In 1943, natural resources of the U.S., including the jojoba oil, were used during war as additives to motor oil, transmission oil, and differential gear oil. Machine guns were lubricated and maintained with jojoba.

== Appearance ==
Unrefined jojoba oil appears as a clear golden liquid at room temperature with a slightly nutty odor. Refined jojoba oil is colorless and odorless. The melting point of jojoba oil is approximately 10 °C (50 °F) and the iodine value is approximately 80. Jojoba oil is relatively shelf-stable when compared with other vegetable oils mainly because it contains few triglycerides, unlike most other vegetable oils such as grape seed oil and coconut oil. It has an oxidative stability index of approximately 60, which means that it is more shelf-stable than safflower oil, canola oil, almond oil, or squalene but less than castor oil and coconut oil.

== Chemistry ==
Physical properties
Freezing point	7-10.6 °C
Refractive index	1.4650 at 25 °C
Specific gravity	0.863 at 25 °C
Smoke point	195 °C
Flash point	295 °C
Iodine number	82
Viscosity	48 SUS at 99 °C 127 SUS at 37.8 °C
Viscosity index	190-230

Fatty-acid content
Fatty acid	Carbon atoms:double bonds	Position(s) of double bond	Percentage (mole fraction)
Palmitic acid	C16:0	-	0.3
Palmitoleic acid	C16:1	9	0.3
Stearic acid	C18:0	-	0.2
Oleic acid	C18:1	9	9.3
Arachidic acid	C20:0	-	-
11-Eicosenoic acid	C20:1	11	76.7
Behenic acid	C22:0	-	trace
Erucic acid	C22:1	13	12.1
Lignoceric acid	C24:0	-	0.1
Nervonic acid	C24:1	15	1.0

The fatty acid content of jojoba oil can vary significantly depending on the soil and climate in which the plant is grown, as well as when it is harvested and how the oil is processed. In general, it contains a high proportion of monounsaturated fatty acids, primarily 11-eicosenoic acid (table).

== Uses ==
Being derived from a plant that is slow-growing and difficult to cultivate, jojoba oil is mainly used for small-scale applications such as pharmaceuticals and cosmetics. Overall, it is used as a replacement for whale oil and its derivatives, such as cetyl alcohol. The ban on importing whale oil to the U.S. in 1971 led to the discovery that jojoba oil is "in many regards superior to sperm whale oil for applications in the cosmetics and other industries".

Jojoba oil is found as an additive in many cosmetic products, especially those marketed as being made from natural ingredients. In particular, such products commonly containing jojoba are lotions and moisturizers, hair shampoos and conditioners.

== See also ==
- Cetoleic acid
- Oleochemical
- Simmondsia chinensis (jojoba) seed powder

== Photo gallery ==
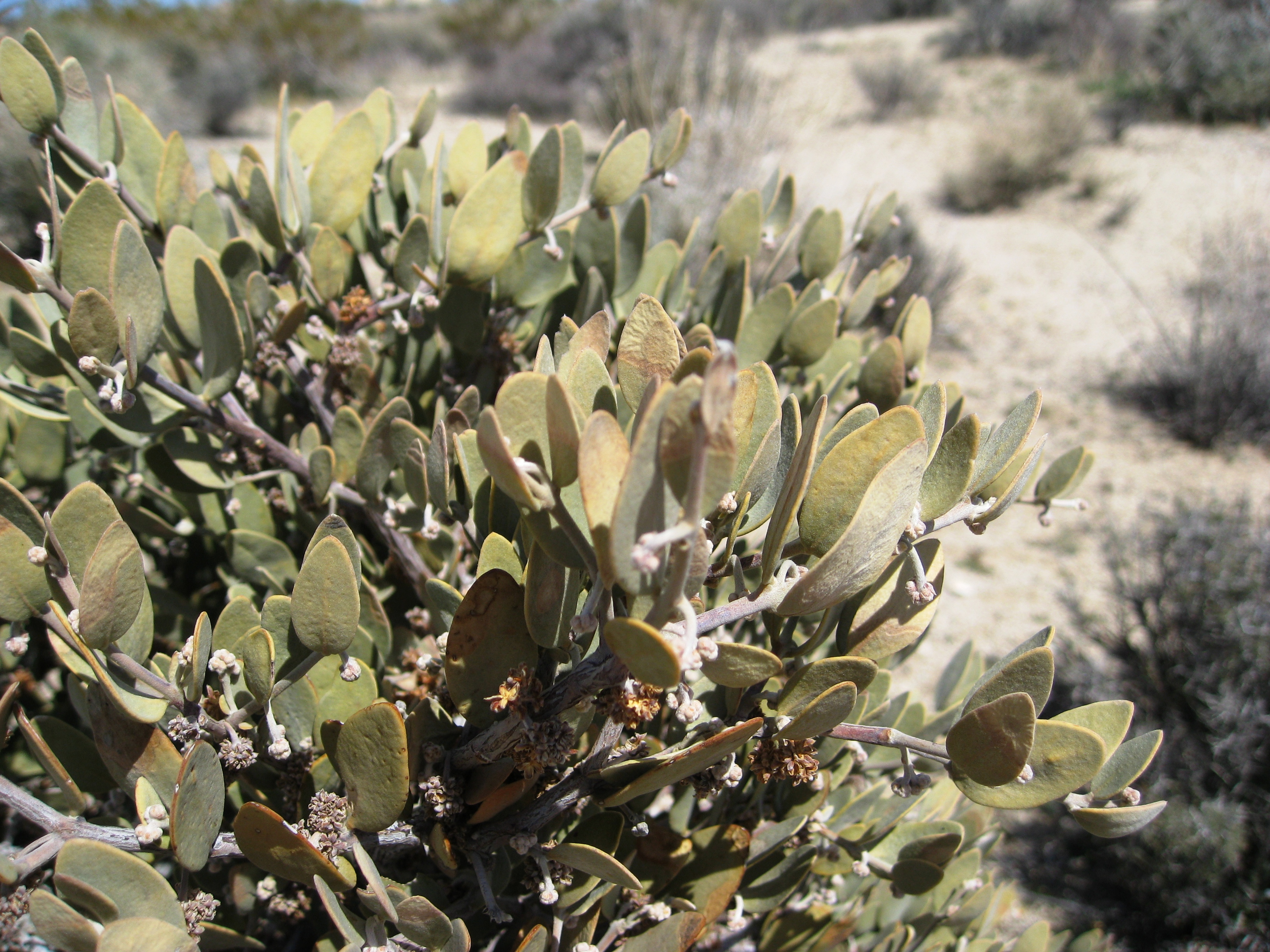
Plant

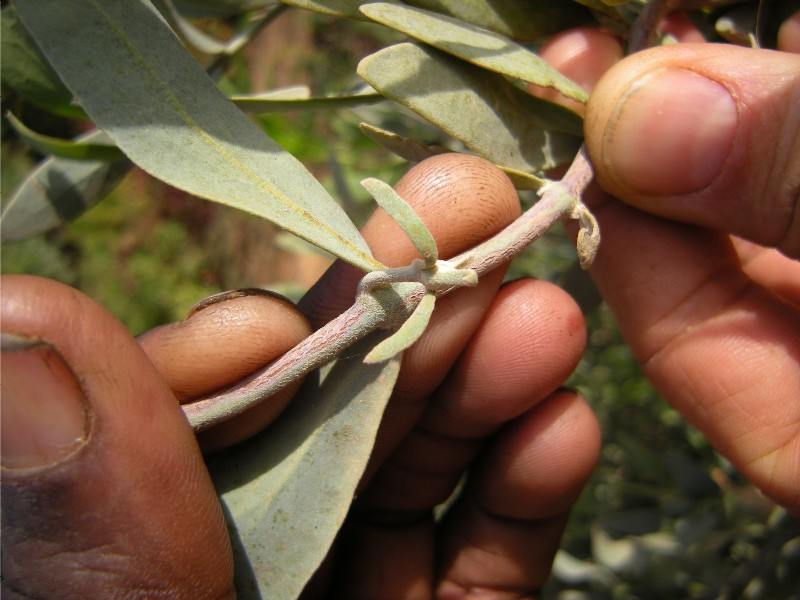
Female flower

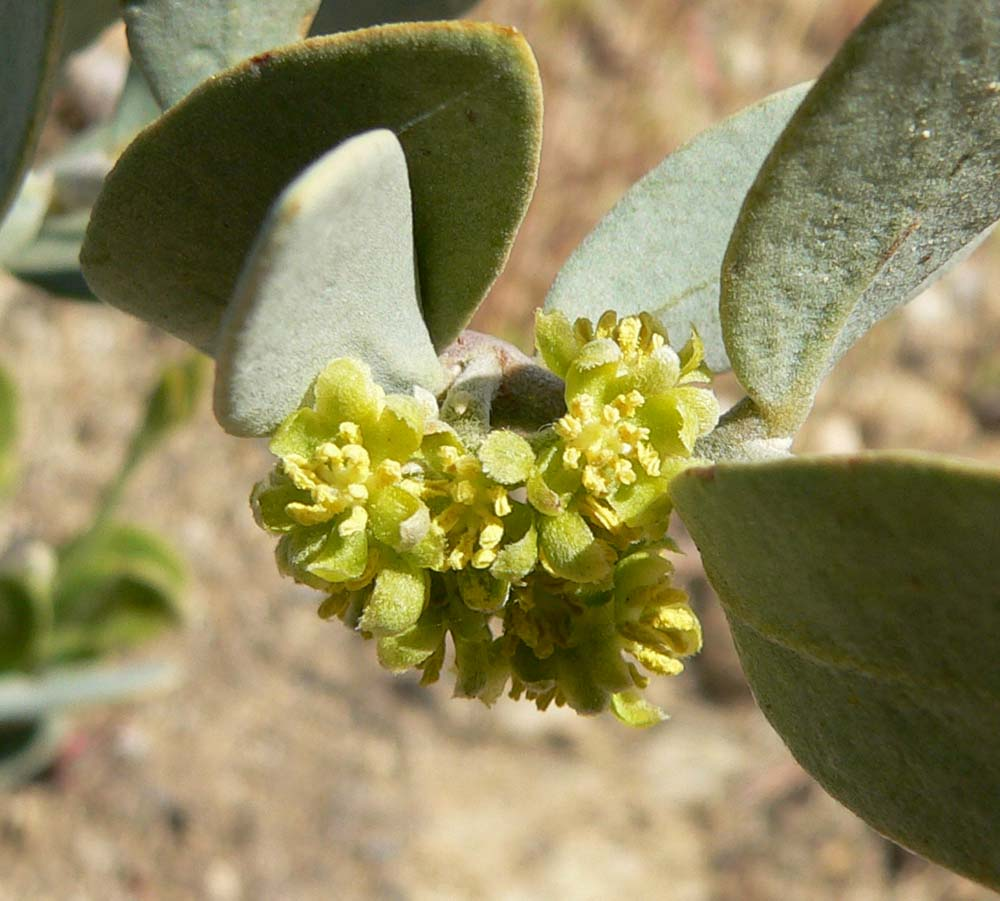
Male flower

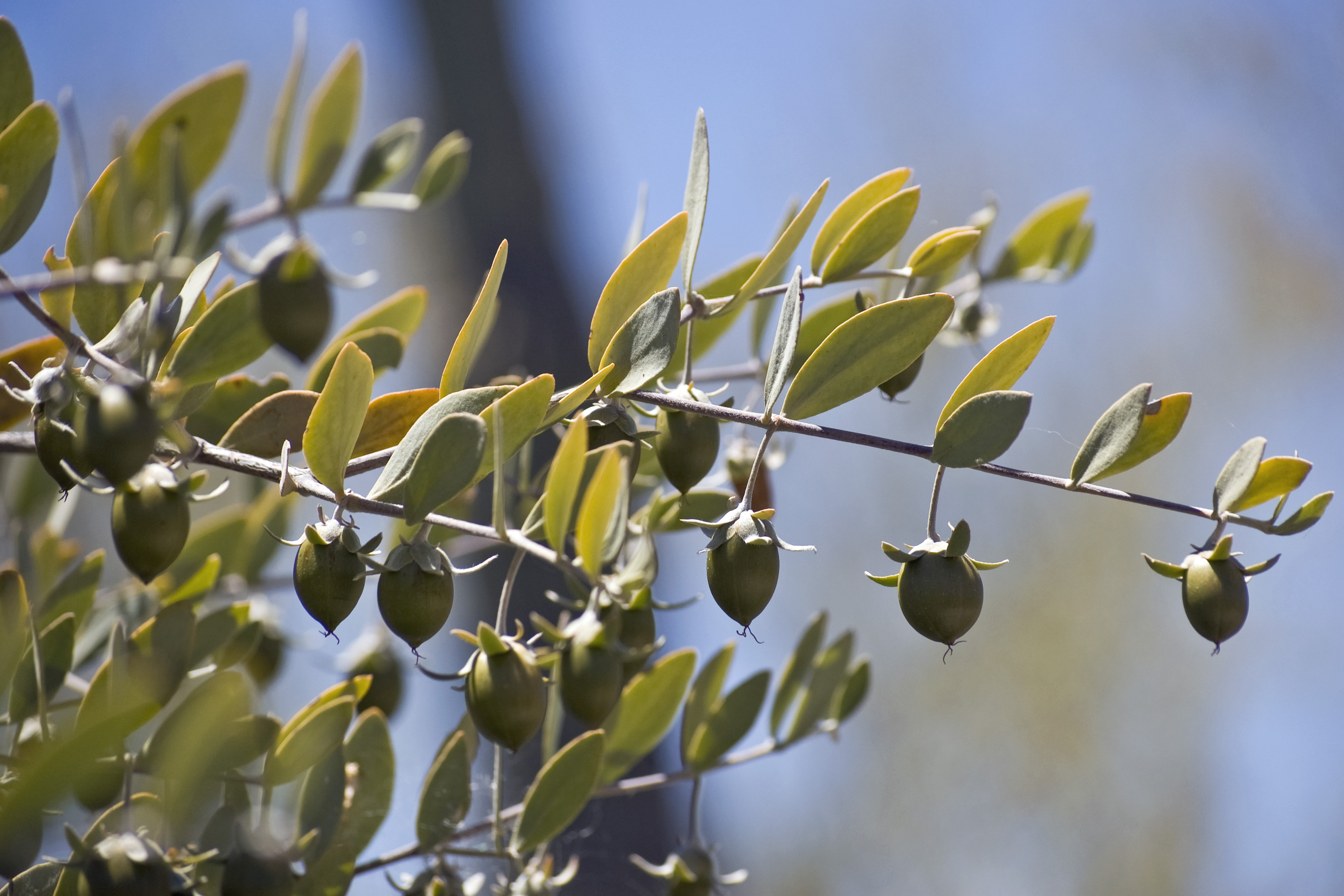
Fruits

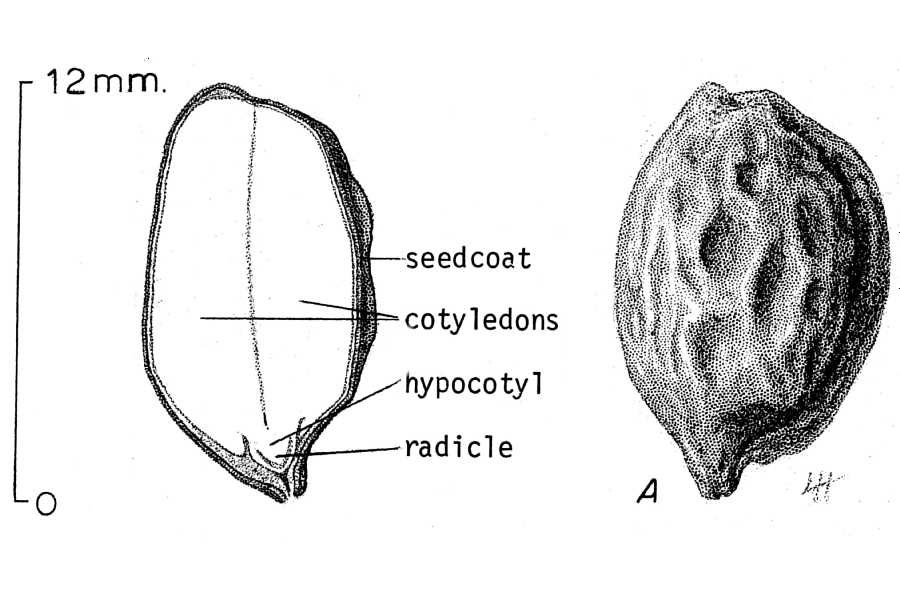
Seed
