= Wax =

Class of organic compounds which are malleable at room temperature

Cetyl palmitate, a typical wax ester

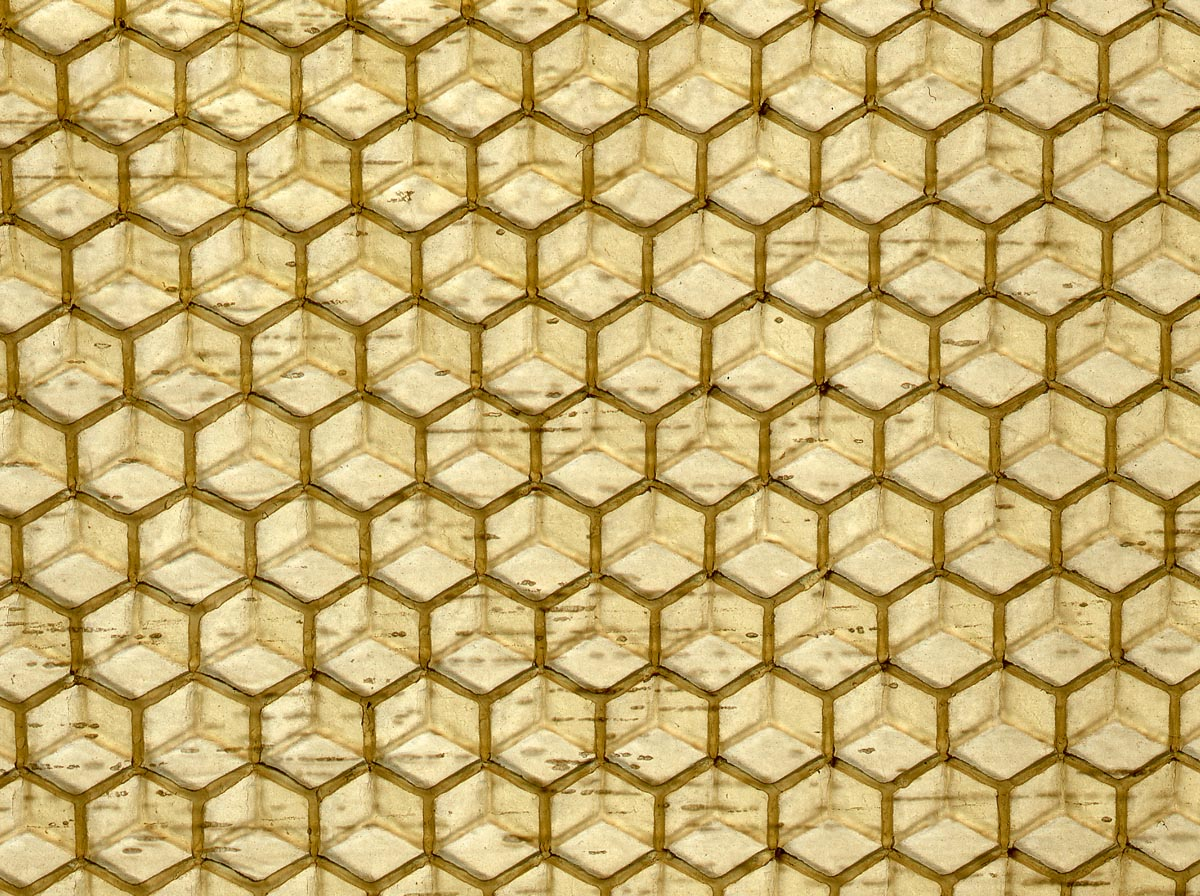
Commercial honeycomb foundation, made by pressing beeswax between patterned metal rollers

Waxes are a diverse class of organic compounds that are lipophilic solids that are malleable near ambient temperatures. They include higher alkanes and lipids, typically with melting points above about 40 °C (104 °F), melting to give low viscosity liquids. Waxes are insoluble in water but soluble in nonpolar organic solvents such as hexane, benzene and chloroform. Natural waxes of various types are produced by plants and animals and occur in petroleum.

== Chemistry ==
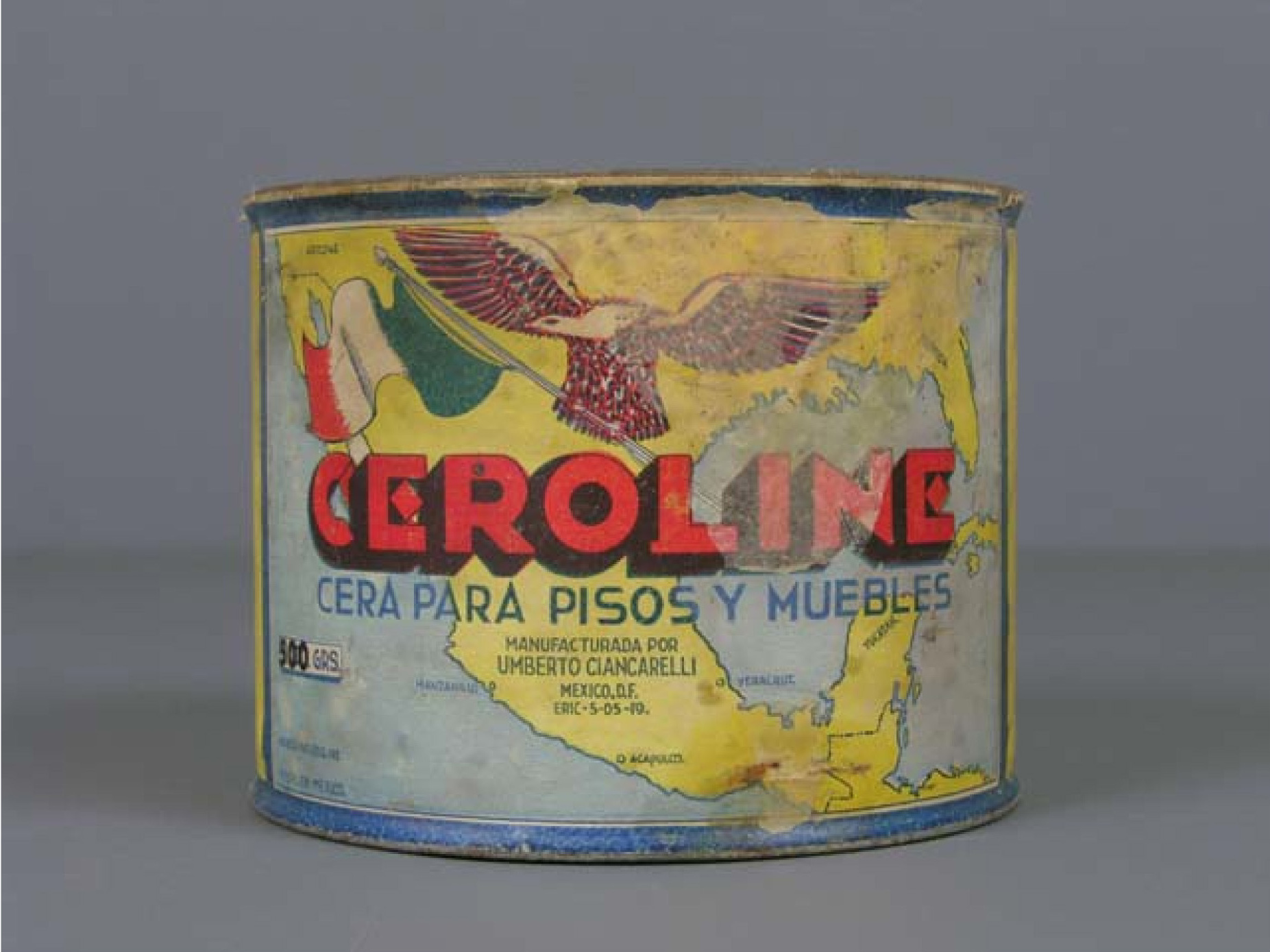
Ceroline brand wax for floors and furniture, first half of 20th century. From the Museo del Objeto del Objeto collection.

Waxes are organic compounds that characteristically consist of long aliphatic alkyl chains, although aromatic compounds may also be present. Natural waxes may contain unsaturated bonds and include various functional groups such as fatty acids, primary and secondary alcohols, ketones, aldehydes and fatty acid esters. Synthetic waxes often consist of homologous series of long-chain aliphatic hydrocarbons (alkanes or paraffins) that lack functional groups.

=== Plant and animal waxes ===
Waxes are synthesized by both plants and animals. Those of animal origin typically consist of wax esters derived from a variety of fatty acids and carboxylic alcohols. In waxes of plant origin, characteristic mixtures of unesterified hydrocarbons may predominate over esters. The composition depends not only on species, but also on geographic location of the organism.

==== Animal waxes ====
The best-known animal wax is beeswax, used in constructing the honeycombs of beehives, but other insects also secrete waxes. A major component of beeswax is myricyl palmitate which is an ester of triacontanol and palmitic acid. Its melting point is 62–65 °C (144–149 °F). Spermaceti occurs in large amounts in the head oil of the sperm whale. One of its main constituents is cetyl palmitate, another ester of a fatty acid and a fatty alcohol. Lanolin is a wax obtained from wool, consisting of esters of sterols.

==== Plant waxes ====
Plants secrete waxes into and on the surface of their cuticles as a way to control evaporation, wettability and hydration. The epicuticular waxes of plants are mixtures of substituted long-chain aliphatic hydrocarbons, containing alkanes, alkyl esters, fatty acids, primary and secondary alcohols, diols, ketones and aldehydes. From the commercial perspective, the most important plant wax is carnauba wax, a hard wax obtained from the Brazilian palm Copernicia prunifera. Containing the ester myricyl cerotate, its many applications include confectionery and other food coatings, car and furniture polish, floss coating, and surfboard wax. Other more specialized vegetable waxes include jojoba oil, candelilla wax and ouricury wax.

==== Modified plant and animal waxes ====
Plant and animal based waxes or oils can undergo selective chemical modifications to produce waxes with more desirable properties than are available in the unmodified starting material. This approach has relied on green chemistry approaches including olefin metathesis and enzymatic reactions and can be used to produce waxes from inexpensive starting materials like vegetable oils.

=== Petroleum derived waxes ===
Although many natural waxes contain esters, paraffin waxes are hydrocarbons, mixtures of alkanes usually in a homologous series of chain lengths. These materials represent a significant fraction of petroleum. They are refined by vacuum distillation. Paraffin waxes are mixtures of saturated n- and iso- alkanes, naphthenes, and alkyl- and naphthene-substituted aromatic compounds. A typical alkane paraffin wax chemical composition comprises hydrocarbons with the general formula C_{n}H_{2n+2}, such as hentriacontane, C_{31}H_{64}. The degree of branching has an important influence on the properties. Microcrystalline wax is a lesser produced petroleum based wax that contains higher percentage of isoparaffinic (branched) hydrocarbons and naphthenic hydrocarbons.

Millions of tons of paraffin waxes are produced annually. They are used in foods (such as chewing gum and cheese wrapping), in candles and cosmetics, as non-stick and waterproofing coatings and in polishes.

==== Montan wax ====
Montan wax is a fossilized wax extracted from coal and lignite. It is very hard, reflecting the high concentration of saturated fatty acids and alcohols. Although dark brown and odorous, they can be purified and bleached to give commercially useful products.

==== Polyethylene and related derivatives ====
As of 1995, about 200 million kilograms of polyethylene waxes were consumed annually.

Polyethylene waxes are manufactured by one of three methods:

1. The direct polymerization of ethylene, potentially including co-monomers;
2. The thermal degradation of high molecular weight polyethylene resin;
3. The recovery of low molecular weight fractions from high molecular weight resin production.

Each production technique generates products with slightly different properties. Key properties of low molecular weight polyethylene waxes are viscosity, density and melt point.

Polyethylene waxes produced by means of degradation or recovery from polyethylene resin streams contain very low molecular weight materials that must be removed to prevent volatilization and potential fire hazards during use. Polyethylene waxes manufactured by this method are usually stripped of low molecular weight fractions to yield a flash point >500 °F (>260 °C). Many polyethylene resin plants produce a low molecular weight stream often referred to as low polymer wax (LPW). LPW is unrefined and contains volatile oligomers, corrosive catalyst and may contain other foreign material and water. Refining of LPW to produce a polyethylene wax involves removal of oligomers and hazardous catalyst. Proper refining of LPW to produce polyethylene wax is especially important when being used in applications requiring FDA or other regulatory certification.

== Uses ==
Waxes are mainly consumed industrially as components of complex formulations, often for coatings. The main use of polyethylene and polypropylene waxes is in the formulation of colourants for plastics. Waxes confer matting effects (i.e., to confer non-glossy finishes) and wear resistance to paints. Polyethylene waxes are incorporated into inks in the form of dispersions to decrease friction. They are employed as release agents, find use as slip agents in furniture, and confer corrosion resistance.

=== Antiquity ===
Wax can be used to make figurines, dolls, puppet heads, wax sculptures, etc. The Department of Egyptian Antiquities of the Louvre displays many human or animal or god figurines, pseudo-mummies (E 21) as well as wax figurine molds (N 1557); a bewitchment figurine depicting a dog devouring a man (E 27079); and a wax tablet (E 10498) known as the "cahier de Papnoution", covered in wax and used as a writing slate (MND 552), etc.

=== Candles ===
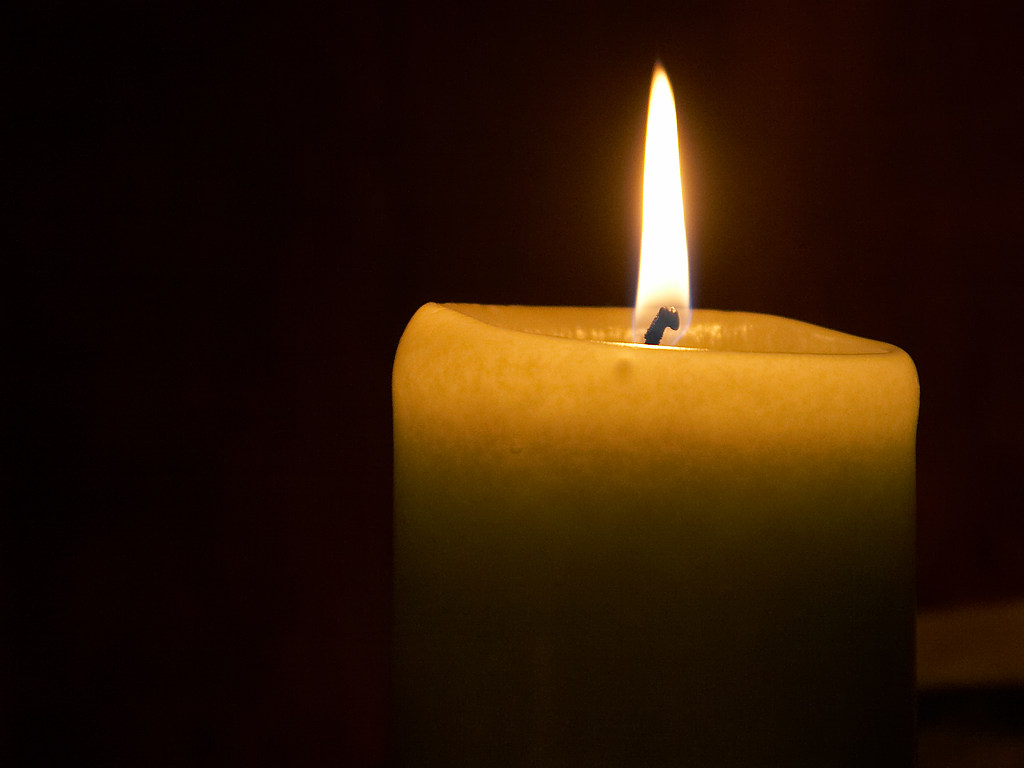
Wax candle

Waxes such as paraffin wax or beeswax, and hard fats such as tallow are used to make candles, used for lighting and decoration. Another fuel type used in candle manufacturing includes soy. Soy wax is made by the hydrogenation process using soybean oil.

=== Wood products ===
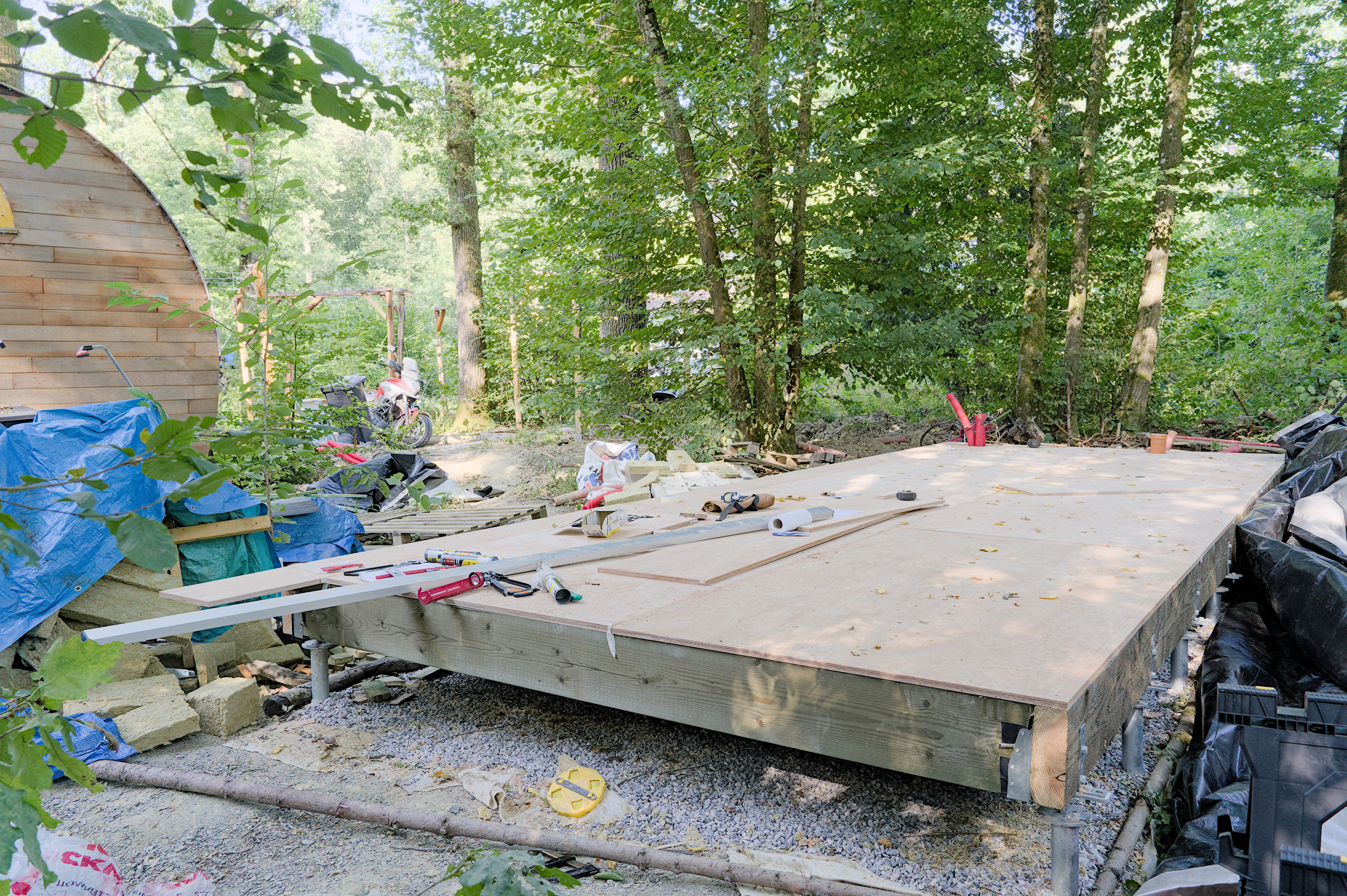
Before treatment

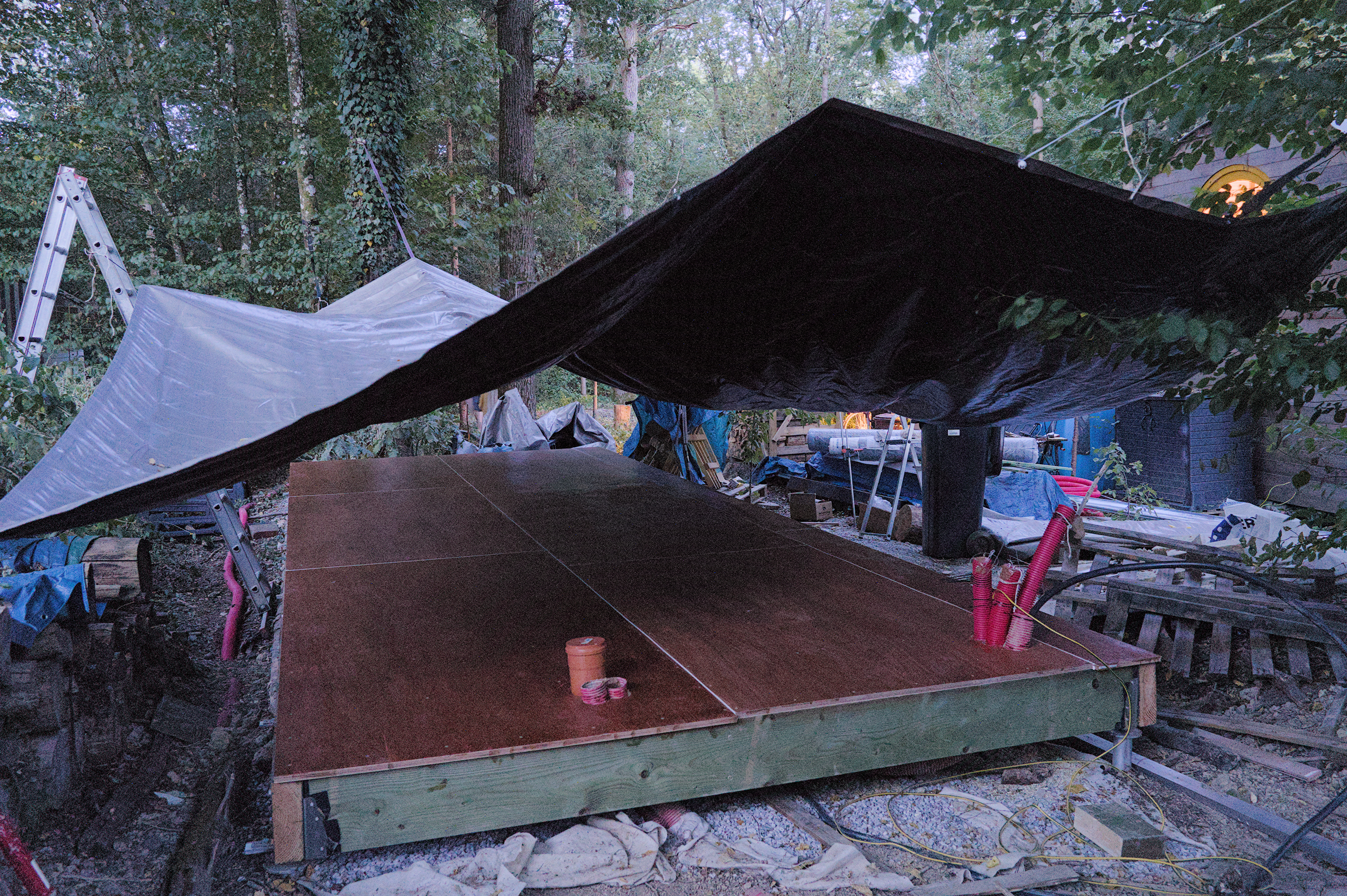
After wax treatment

A plywood floor before and after applying a wax treatment.

Waxes are used as finishes and coatings for wood products. Beeswax is frequently used as a lubricant on drawer slides where wood to wood contact occurs.

=== Other uses ===
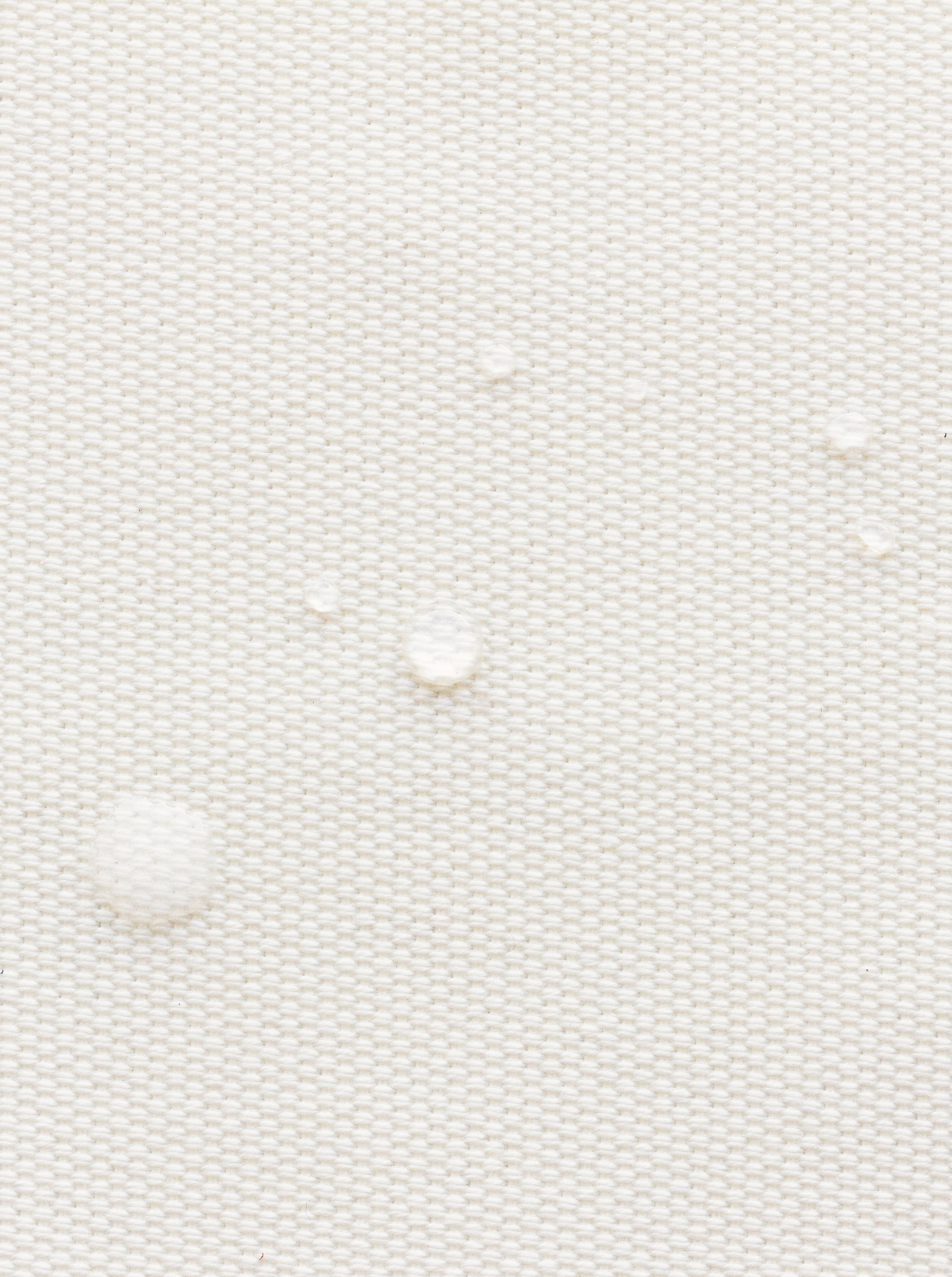
A wax coating makes this Manila hemp waterproof.

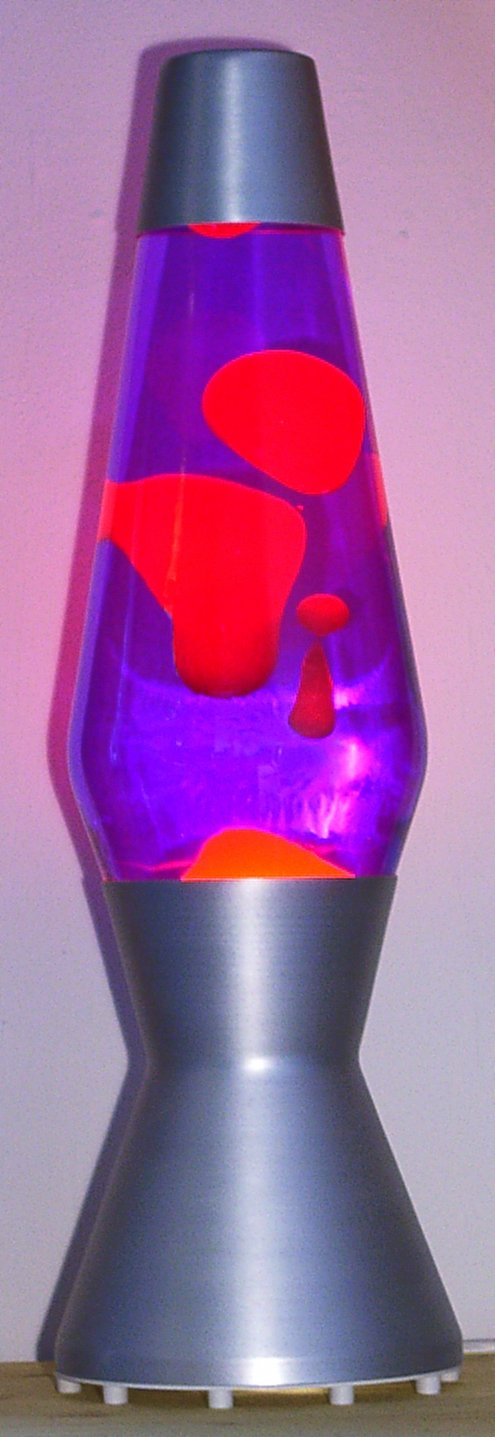
A lava lamp is a novelty item that contains wax melted from below by a bulb. The wax rises and falls in decorative, molten blobs.

Sealing wax was used to close important documents in the Middle Ages. Wax tablets were used as writing surfaces. There were different types of wax in the Middle Ages, namely four kinds of wax (Ragusan, Montenegro, Byzantine, and Bulgarian), "ordinary" waxes from Spain, Poland, and Riga, unrefined waxes and colored waxes (red, white, and green). Waxes are used to make waxed paper, impregnating and coating paper and card to waterproof it or make it resistant to staining, or to modify its surface properties. Waxes are also used in shoe polishes, wood polishes, and automotive polishes, as mold release agents in mold making, as a coating for many cheeses, and to waterproof leather and fabric. Wax has been used since antiquity as a temporary, removable model in lost-wax casting of gold, silver and other materials.

Colorfully pigmented wax has been used as a medium in encaustic painting and is used today in the manufacture of crayons, china markers, and colored pencils. Carbon paper, used for making duplicate typewritten documents was coated with carbon black suspended in wax, typically montan wax, but has largely been superseded by photocopiers and computer printers. In another context, lipstick and mascara are blends of various fats and waxes colored with pigments, and both beeswax and lanolin are used in other cosmetics. Ski wax is used in skiing and snowboarding. Also, the sports of surfing and skateboarding often use wax to enhance the performance.

Some waxes are considered food-safe and are used to coat wooden cutting boards and other items that come into contact with food. Beeswax or coloured synthetic wax is used to decorate Easter eggs in Romania, Ukraine, Poland, Lithuania and the Czech Republic. Paraffin wax is used in making chocolate covered sweets.

Wax is also used in wax bullets, which are used as simulation aids, and for wax sculpturing.

== Specific examples ==
=== Animal waxes ===
- Beeswax – produced by honey bees
- Chinese wax – produced by the scale insect Ceroplastes ceriferus
- Lanolin (wool wax) – from the sebaceous glands of sheep
- Shellac wax – from the lac insect Kerria lacca
- Spermaceti – from the head cavities and blubber of the sperm whale

=== Vegetable waxes ===
- Bayberry wax – from the surface wax of the fruits of the bayberry shrub, Myrica faya or sister species Myrica cerifera or Myrica pensylvanica
- Candelilla wax – from the Mexican shrubs Euphorbia cerifera and Euphorbia antisyphilitica
- Carnauba wax – from the leaves of the carnauba palm, Copernicia cerifera
- Castor wax – catalytically hydrogenated castor oil
- Esparto wax – a byproduct of making paper from esparto grass (Macrochloa tenacissima)
- Japan wax – a vegetable triglyceride (not a true wax), from the berries of Rhus and Toxicodendron species
- Jojoba oil – a liquid wax ester, from the seed of Simmondsia chinensis.
- Ouricury wax – from the Brazilian feather palm, Syagrus coronata.
- Rice bran wax – obtained from rice bran (Oryza sativa)
- Soy wax – from soybean oil
- Tallow tree wax – from the seeds of the tallow tree Triadica sebifera.

=== Mineral waxes ===
- Ceresin waxes
- Montan wax – extracted from lignite and brown coal
- Ozocerite – found in lignite beds
- Peat waxes

=== Petroleum waxes ===
- Paraffin wax – made of long-chain alkane hydrocarbons
- Microcrystalline wax – with very fine crystalline structure

== See also ==
- Slip melting point
- Wax acid
- Wax argument, or the "ball of wax example", is a thought experiment originally articulated by René Descartes.
