= Votive candle =

Type of votive offering in Christianity

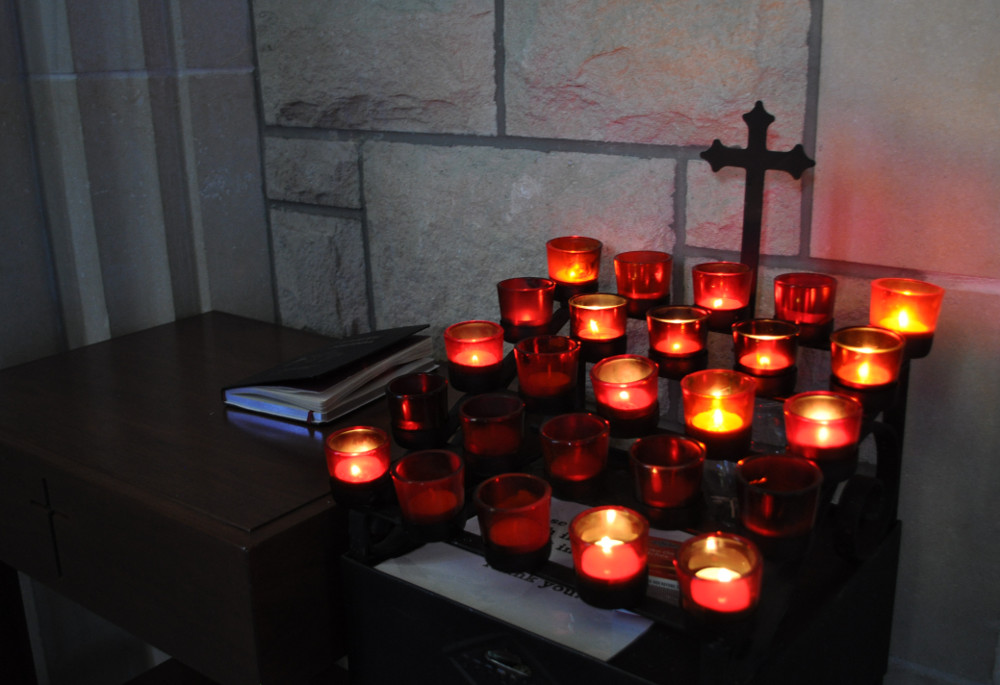
A votive candle rack at Grace Episcopal Cathedral, an Anglican Christian cathedral in Topeka

A votive candle or prayer candle is a small candle, typically white or beeswax yellow, intended to be burnt as a votive offering in an act of Christian prayer, especially within the Anglican, Lutheran, and Roman Catholic Christian denominations, among others. In Christianity, votive candles are commonplace in many churches, as well as home altars, and symbolize the "prayers the worshipper is offering for him or herself, or for other people." The size of a votive candle is often two inches tall by one and a half inches diameter, although other votive candles can be significantly taller and wider. In other religions, such as Hinduism and Buddhism, similar offerings exist, which include diyas and butter lamps.

== Use by Christian denominations ==
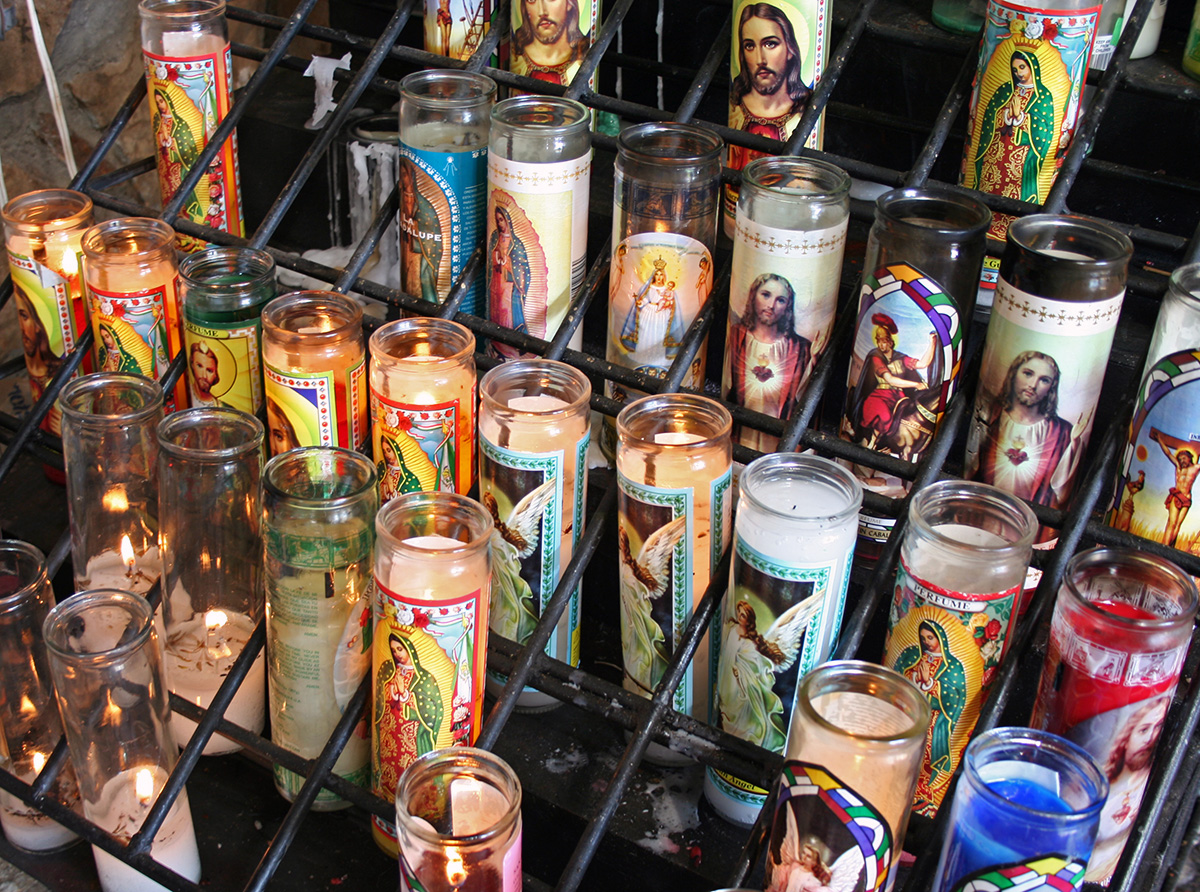
Votive candles at a small Roman Catholic Christian grotto in the American state of Texas

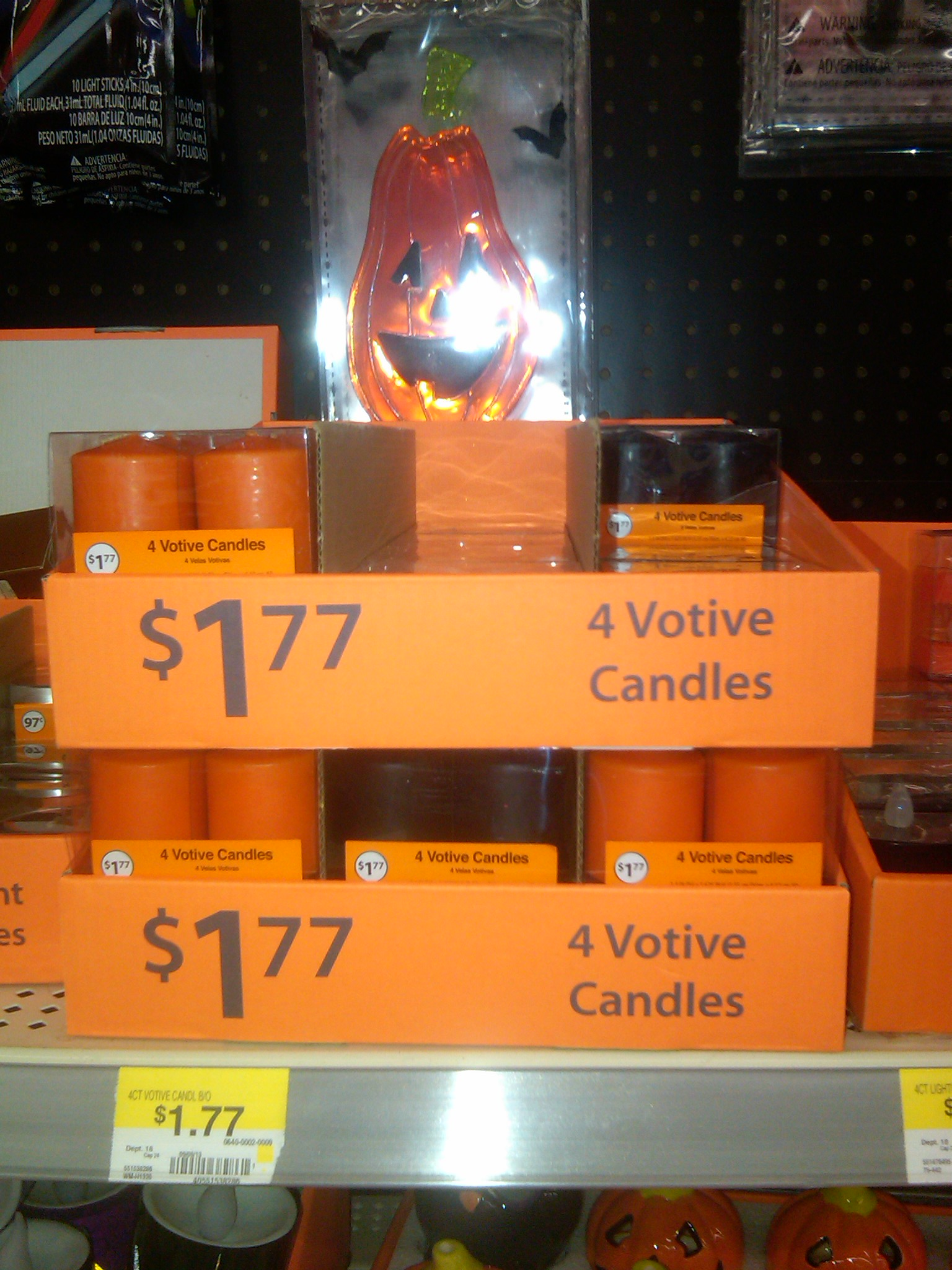
Votive candles on sale for Halloween in a United States department store

Candles are lit for prayer intentions. To "light a candle for someone" indicates one's intention to say a prayer for another person, and the candle symbolizes that prayer. Many times, "a board is placed nearby with names of those for whom prayer is requested." A donation box is usually placed near a votive candle rack in order that Christians lighting the votive candles can help defray the cost of votive candles, and make a votive offering to the church.

=== Eastern Orthodoxy and Oriental Orthodoxy ===
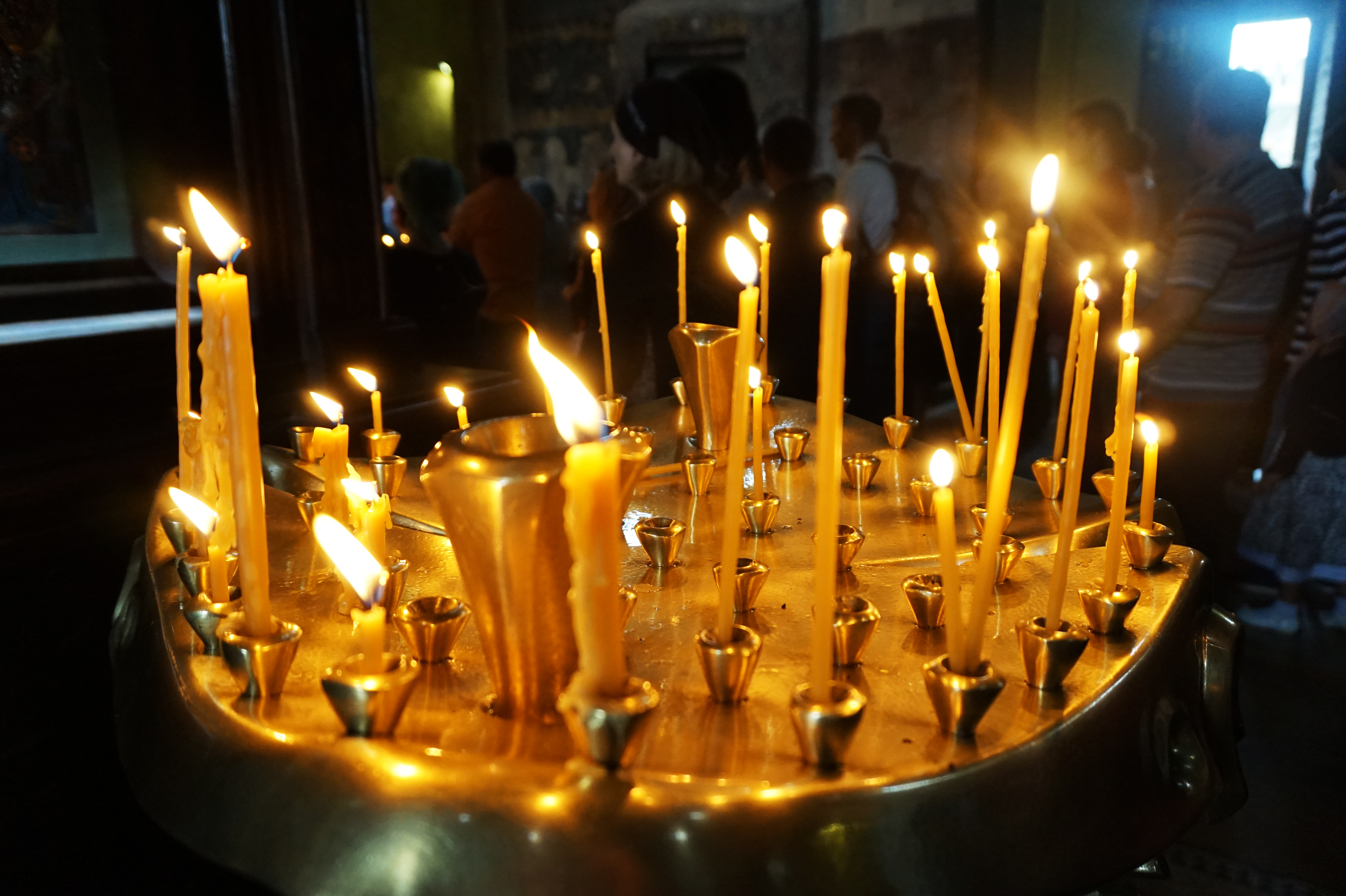
Orthodox churches use long, thin candles, which are placed in round containers.

In the Eastern Orthodox Church, candles are lit before icons, usually of Jesus Christ or the Theotokos. Usually Orthodox churches only use long, thin candles. These are usually placed in round containers, having either various sockets to hold the candles, or in a container filled with sand in which the worshipers place their candles. Orthodox churches will usually have a separate place to put candles lit for the departed; Lutheran, Anglican and Roman Catholic churches make no such distinction.

=== Catholicism ===
In the Roman Catholic Church, candles are at times placed before a statue of Jesus, of the Blessed Virgin Mary, or of some other saint. Often, in older or traditional churches, this will be before a bye-altar.

A votive candle signifies literally that the lighting is done in fulfillment of a vow (Latin, votum), although in most cases the intention is to give honor and to seek help from the saint before whose images the candle is lit and to pray for the dead.

Candles used may vary from long, taper-type candles to tealight candles. Tealight candles are either placed in holders or just on a platform in front of the statue. Long candles may be placed in a special holder.

=== Lutheranism ===
Lutheran churches may use votive candles which may be lit at home, as a part of personal or family devotions, or at the church. They are usually lit on the altar rails, or in front of the altar cross. They are also often lit during the liturgy of Good Friday.

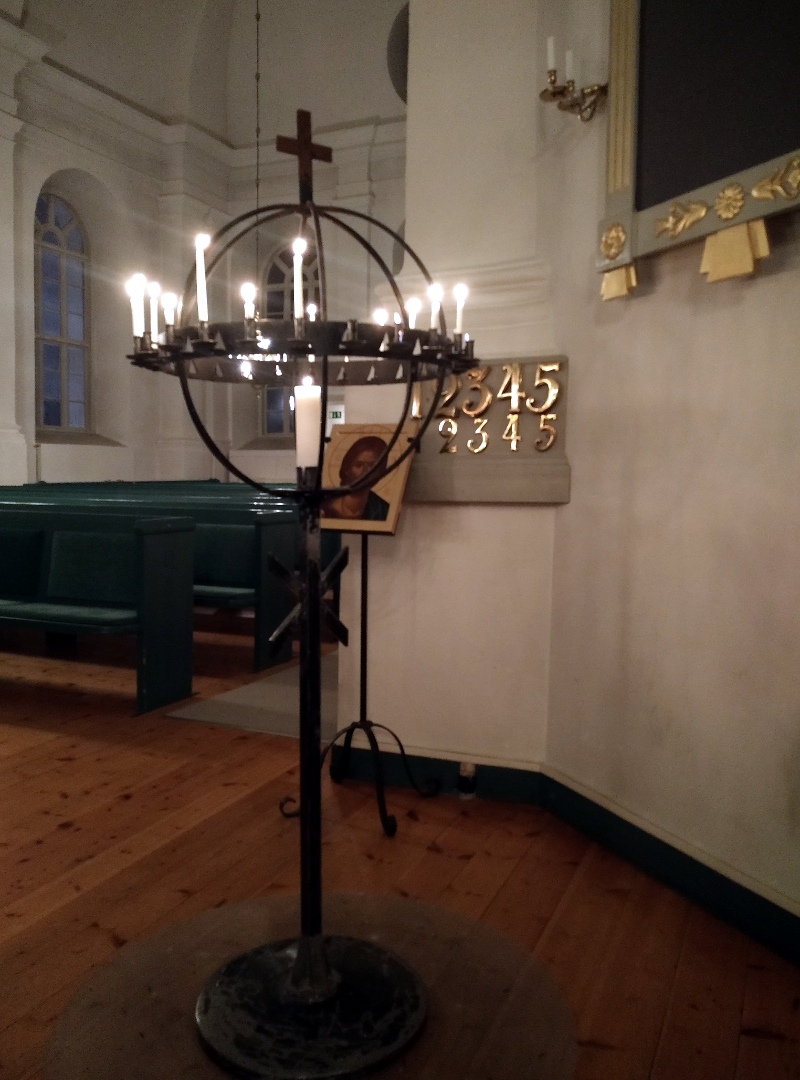
Votive candle holder stands before an icon of Christ in a Church of Sweden parish church in Skellefteå, Sweden.

Within the Nordic Lutheran churches of Sweden, Norway, Denmark and Finland, all High Church Lutheran denominations, the use of votive candles is commonplace and most, if not all, churches and chapels will have a votive candle holder (Swedish: Ljusbärare). These are somewhat similar to the Eastern Orthodox type, usually a round metal frame with several sockets surrounding a central, larger candle on which to light the votive candles. As in Eastern Orthodox Churches, Nordic Lutheran votive candles are also long and thin.

=== Anglicanism ===
Some Anglican churches, especially those that worship in the High Church or Anglo-Catholic tradition, have votive candles for purposes of praying for the dead as well as asking for saintly intercession.

=== Methodism ===
In the United Methodist Church, those churches which worship in the High Church tradition make use of votive candles. During the liturgical celebration of Allhallowtide, especially on All Saints' Day (All Hallows' Day), votive candles are lit and a prayer is said for each person of the congregation who has died that year.

=== Reformed ===
In the Reformed tradition (inclusive of the Continental Reformed, Presbyterian, Congregationalist denominations), votive candles are lit during Totensonntag, a holy day that commemorates the faithful departed.

== History ==
During all the Middle Ages the burning of lamps, or sometimes candles, before relics, shrines, statues, and other objects of devotion was a form of piety which greatly appealed to the alms of the faithful. Almost every collection of early English wills bears witness to it, and even in the smaller churches the number of such lights founded by private beneficence was often surprisingly great. It not infrequently happened that every guild and association maintained a special light of its own, and, besides these, there were such objects of devotion as the "Jesus light", the "Hok-light" (which seems to have to do with a popular festival kept on the second Monday or Tuesday after Easter Sunday), the "Rood light", the "egg light" (probably maintained by contributions of eggs), the "bachelor's light", the "maiden's light", the "Soul's light", etc. Many of these bequests will be found conveniently illustrated and classified in Leland Duncan and Arthur Hussey's Testamenta Cantiana, London 1906.

== Secular adaptations ==
In the 2010s, votive candles have been sold with celebrities or political figures fashioned to look like saints. Some secular subjects of votive candles include Ruth Bader Ginsburg and Jonathan Van Ness. The secular appropriation of votive candles, a religious symbol, has caused controversy. Kim Kardashian faced backlash after selling an $18 votive candle with her face in the likeness of the Virgin Mary. In 2019, Vox wrote that "by replacing a saint with a celebrity that is outright silly (like Steve Buscemi or Harambe the gorilla), you are dismissing the function of the prayer candle altogether." Bill Donohue of the Catholic League said he did not find the candles offensive. "By definition, a celebrity doesn't need a PR presence, so the likely motivating force is narcissism," he says. "By ripping off Catholic iconography, these celebs pay a backhanded compliment to the Catholic Church in their quest for notoriety."

== Composition ==
Votive candles are made from different types of waxes including paraffin, soy wax, or beeswax. There are different grades of wax with different melting points. Paraffin is often mixed with other types of waxes, such as beeswax or vegetable wax. This is done to obtain the rigidity necessary for the type of candle being made. The speed at which the candle burns depends on the composition of the wax. A taper candle that sits in a ring-shaped candle holder may have a low melting point and produce little to no oil, whereas a votive candle set in a glass cup may have a very low melting point and turn to oil. Pillar candles, large candles often with multiple wicks, have their own formula. Soy jar candles tend to have a lower melting point than pillars and votive candles. Candle quality also varies widely depending on the candle maker. The aroma of a lighted scented candle is released through the evaporation of the fragrance from the hot wax pool and from the solid candle itself.

Lead wicks are unlikely to be found in any candle sold in the U.S. today: lead-core wicks have been banned from the U.S. since 2003, and members of the National Candle Association – which account for more than 90% of candles made in the U.S. – have not used lead wicks for more than 30 years. Reputable manufacturers use cotton, cotton-paper, zinc-core or tin-core wicks, all of which are known to be safe.

== Gallery ==
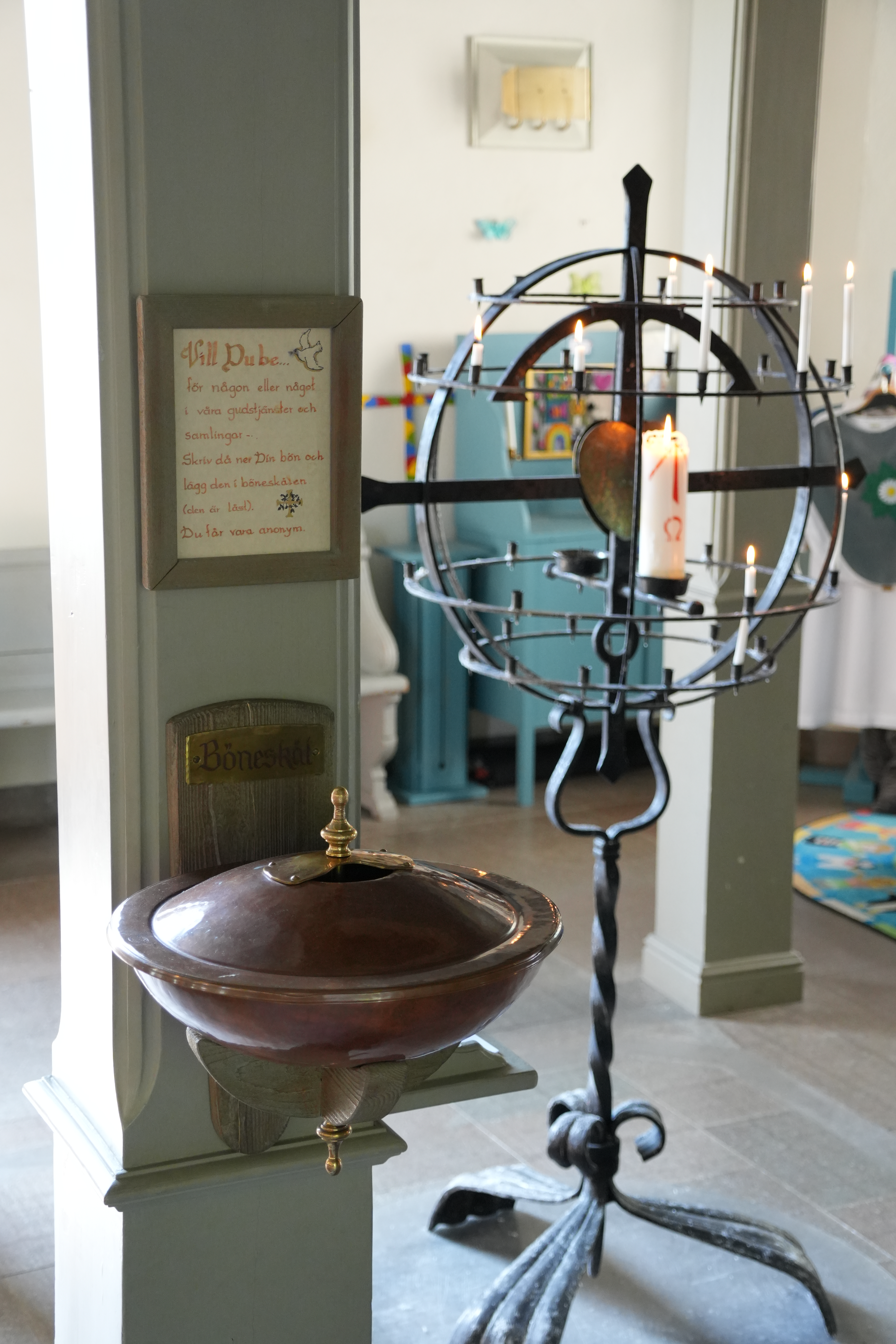
Votive candle rack next to an intercessory prayer box at Norrtälje Church (Evangelical-Lutheran)

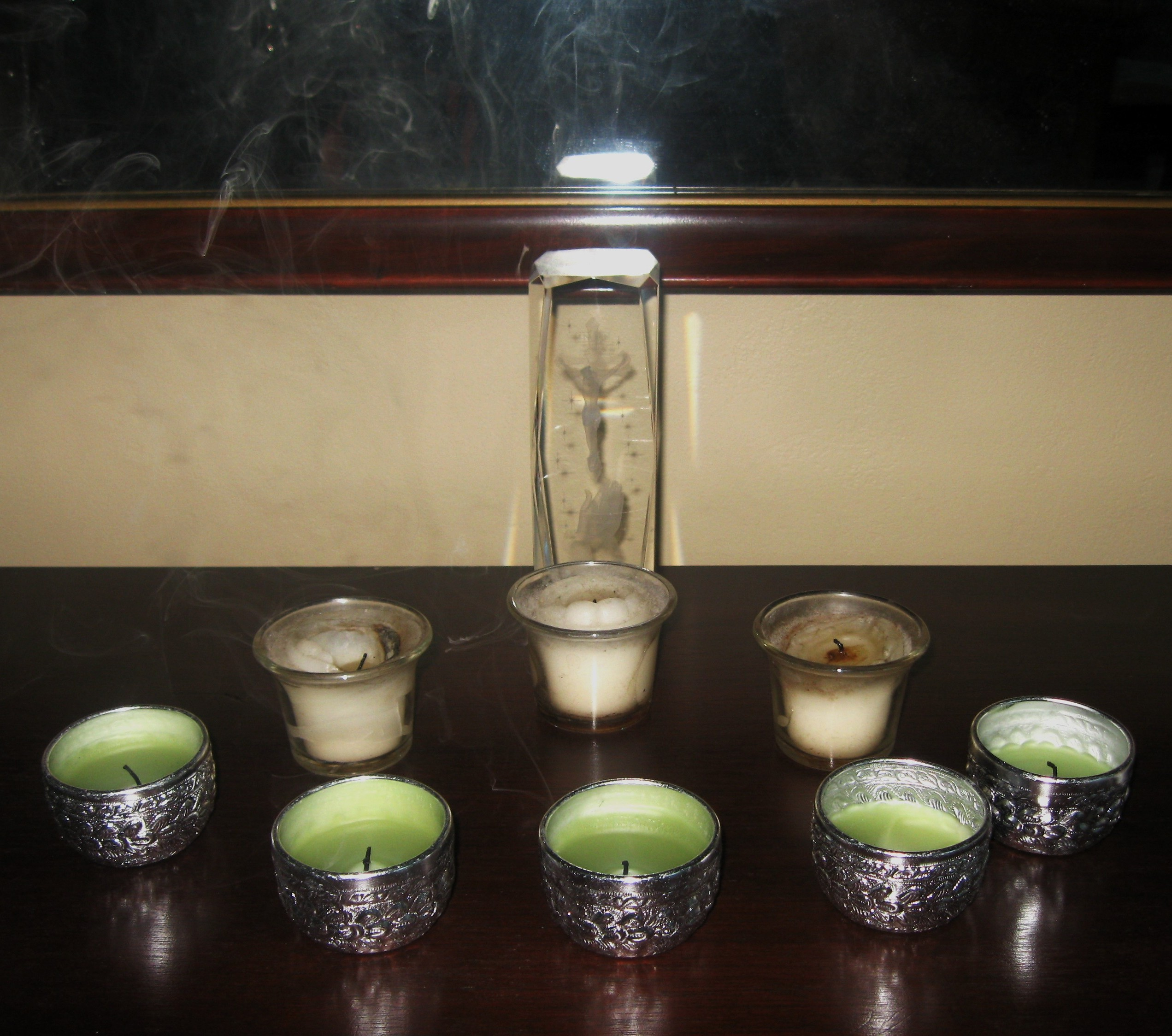
Votive candles on a Christian home altar surrounding a crucifix in crystal

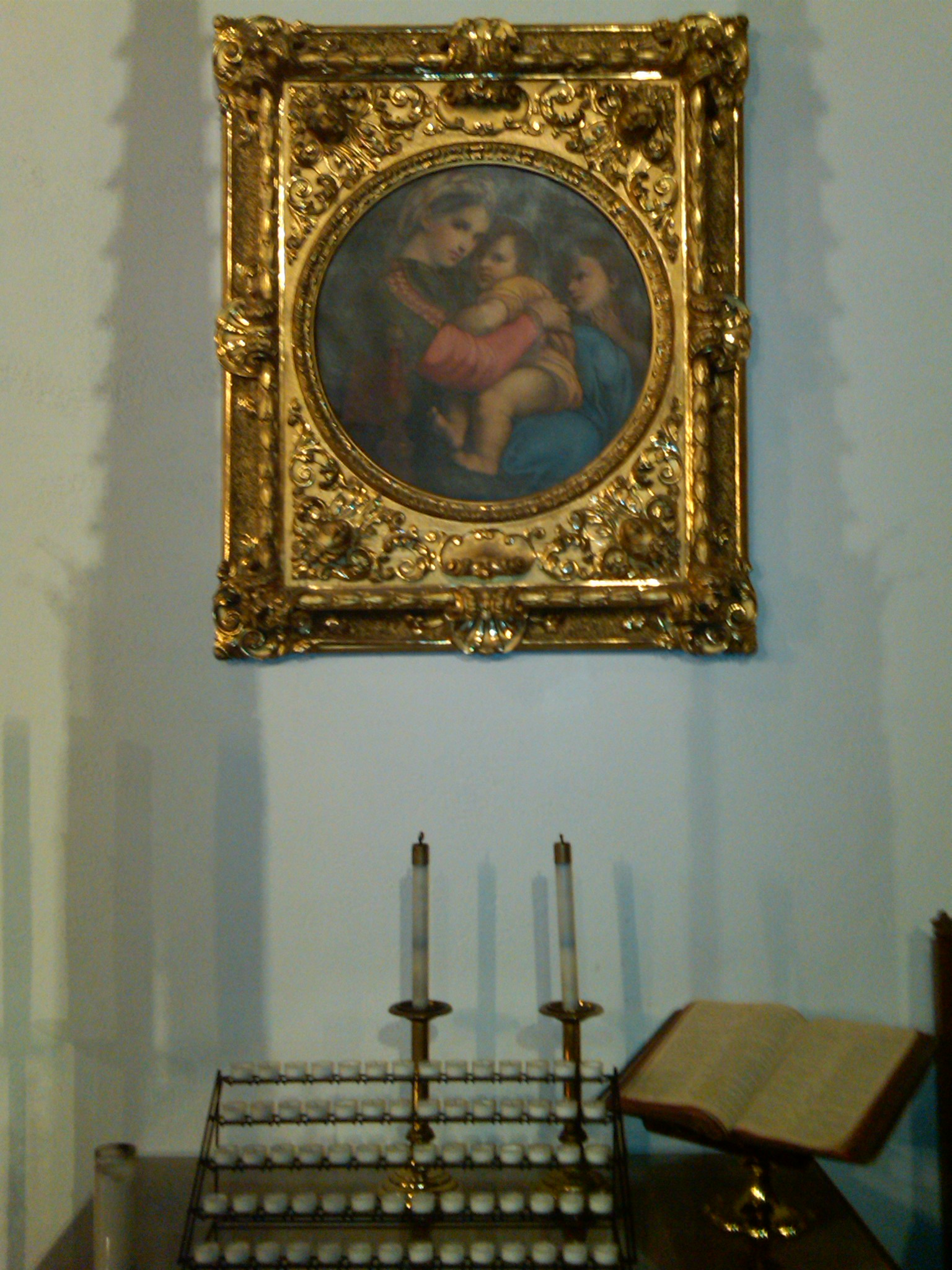
Madonna and Child with a votive candle rack and prie-dieu in a Methodist church

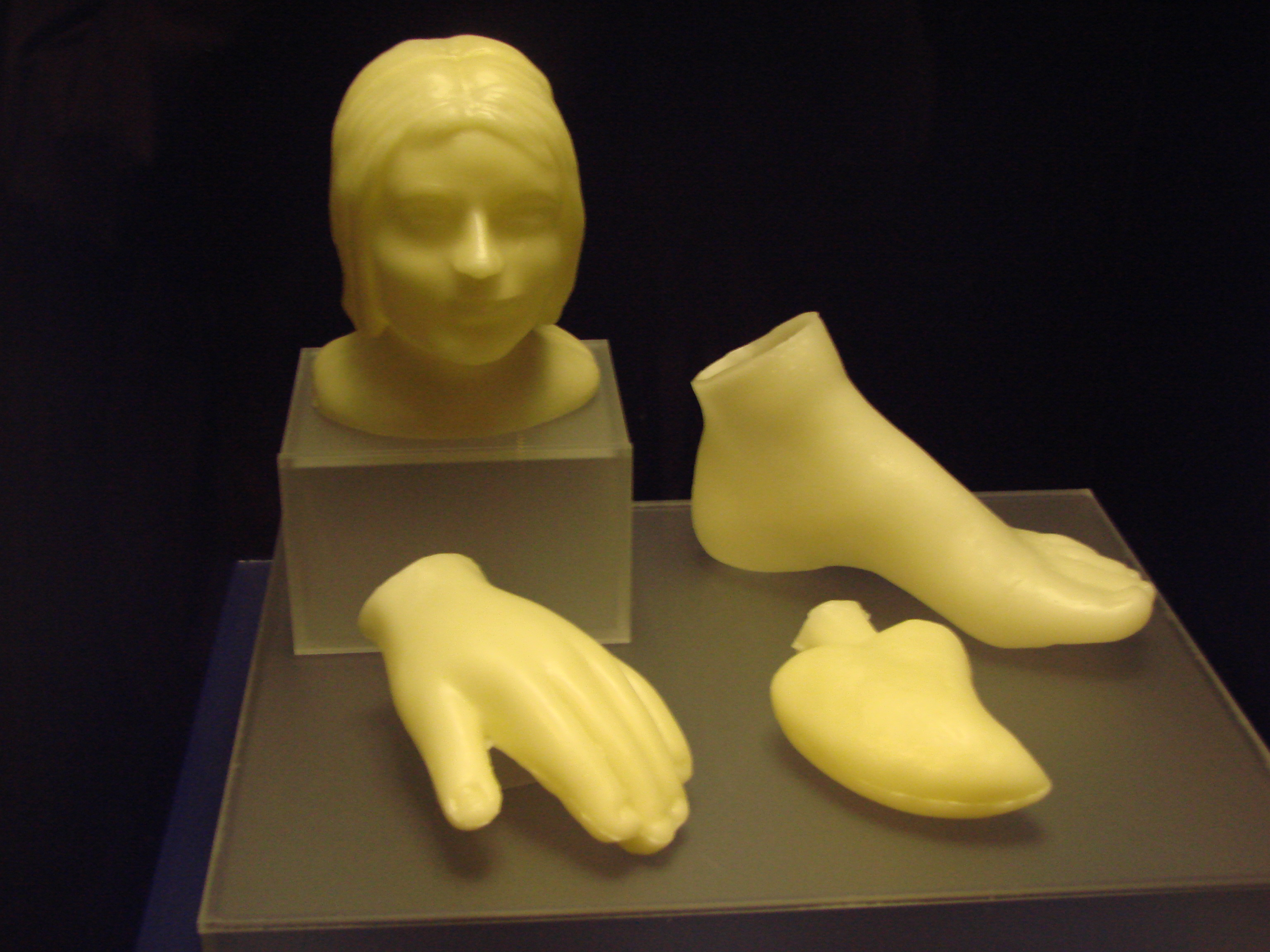
Portuguese votive candles in the shape of afflicted body parts

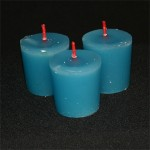
Hand-poured blue votive candles

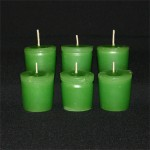
Hand-poured green votive candles

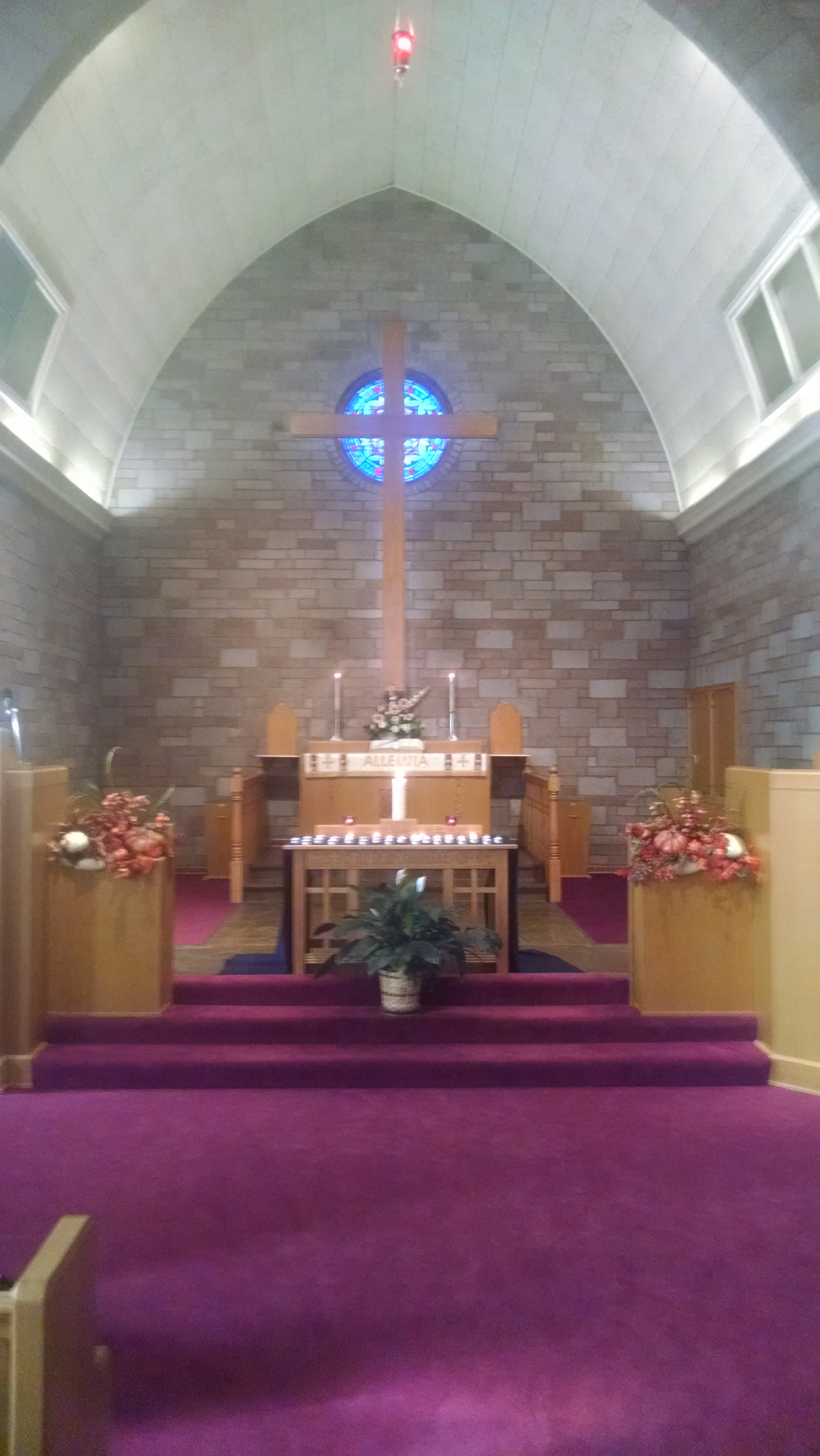
Votive candles lit for the faithful departed at a Congregationalist church for Totensonntag

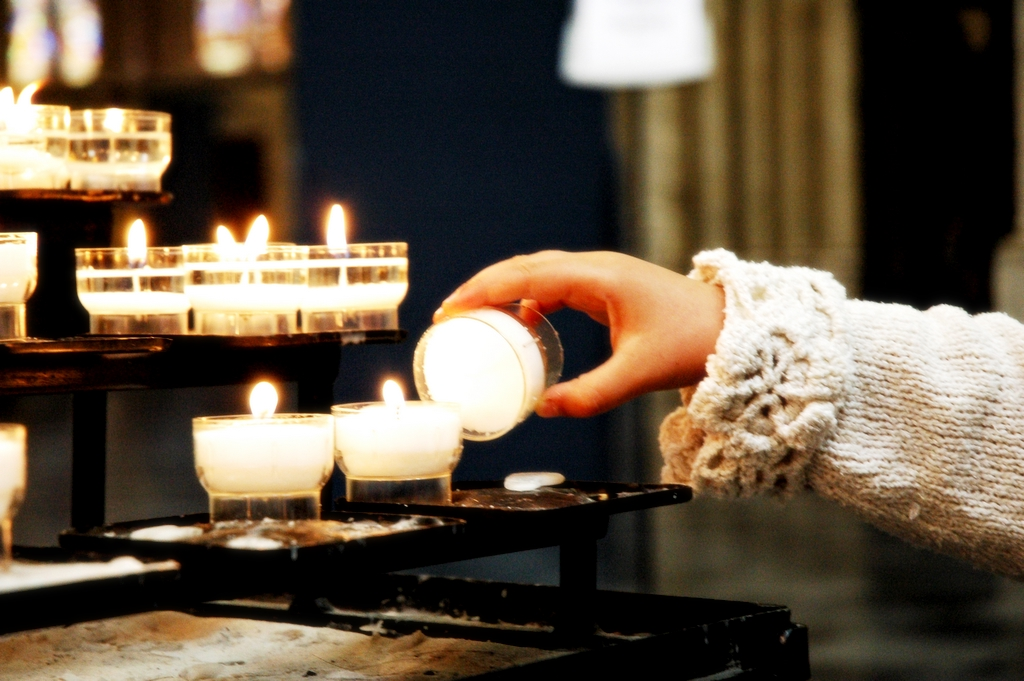
A child lighting a votive candle at the Catholic Christian Cathedral of St. Michael and St. Gudula in Brussels

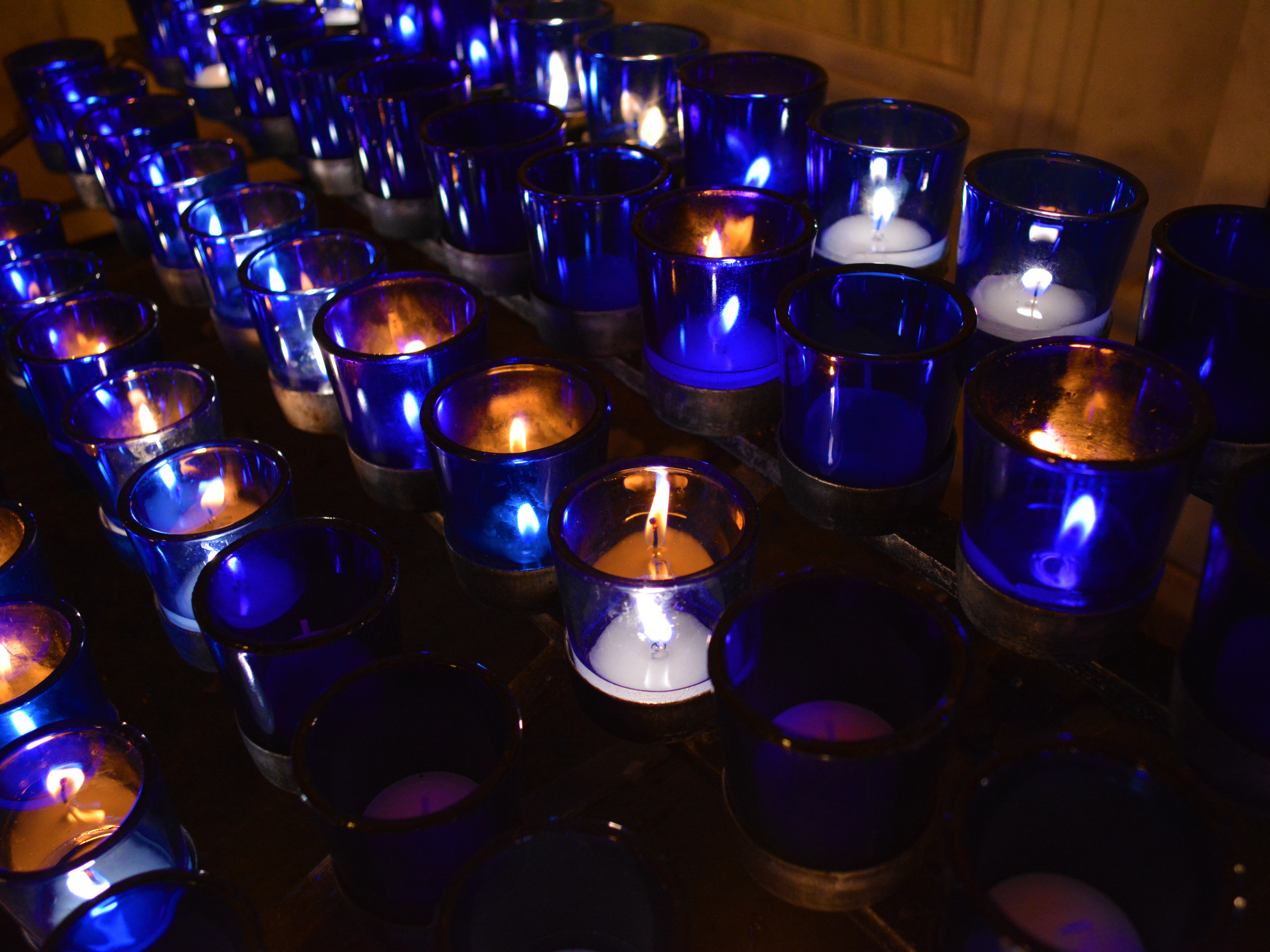
Votive candles at the Cathedral Basilica of St. Louis

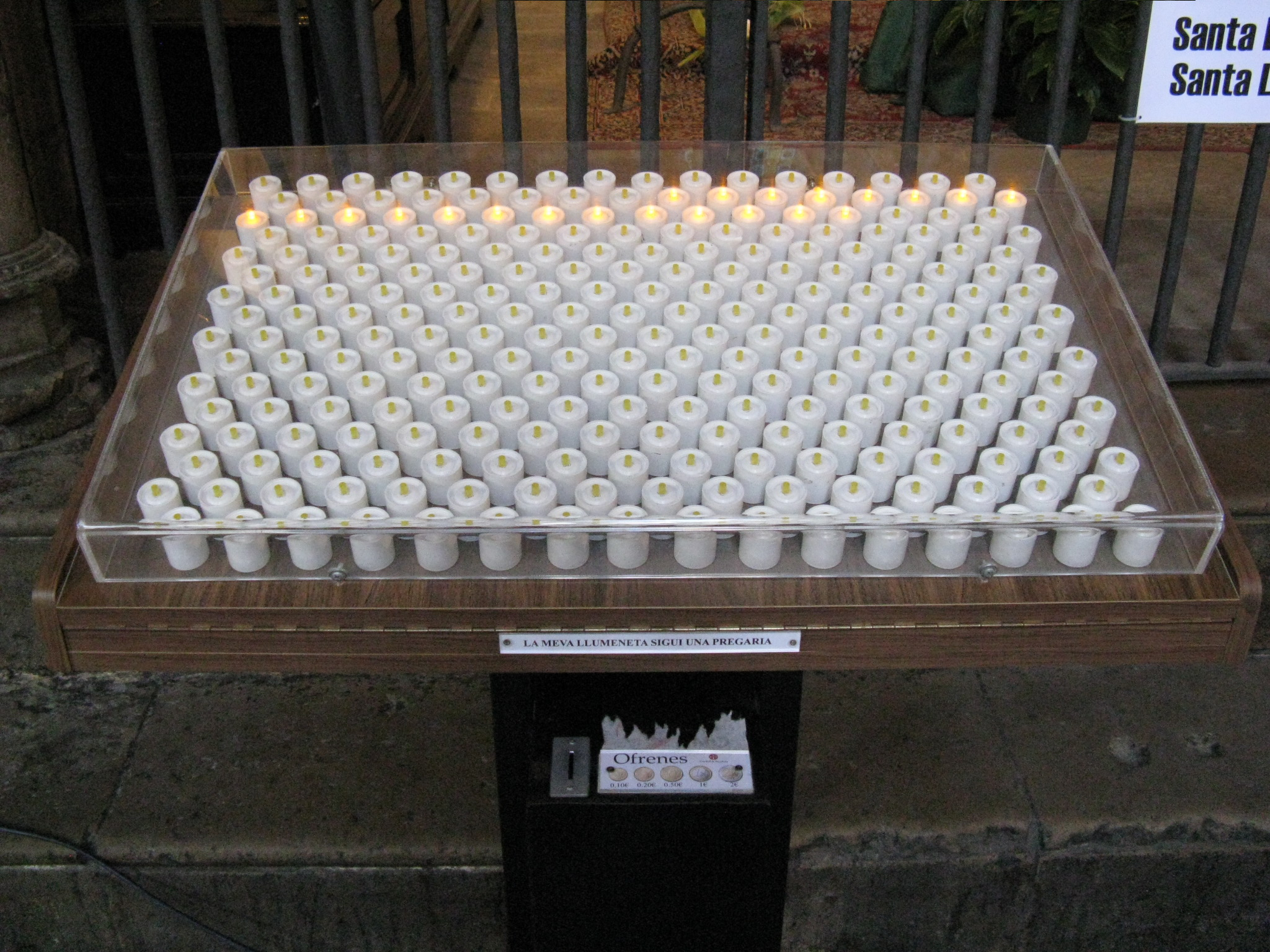
Automatic votive candles

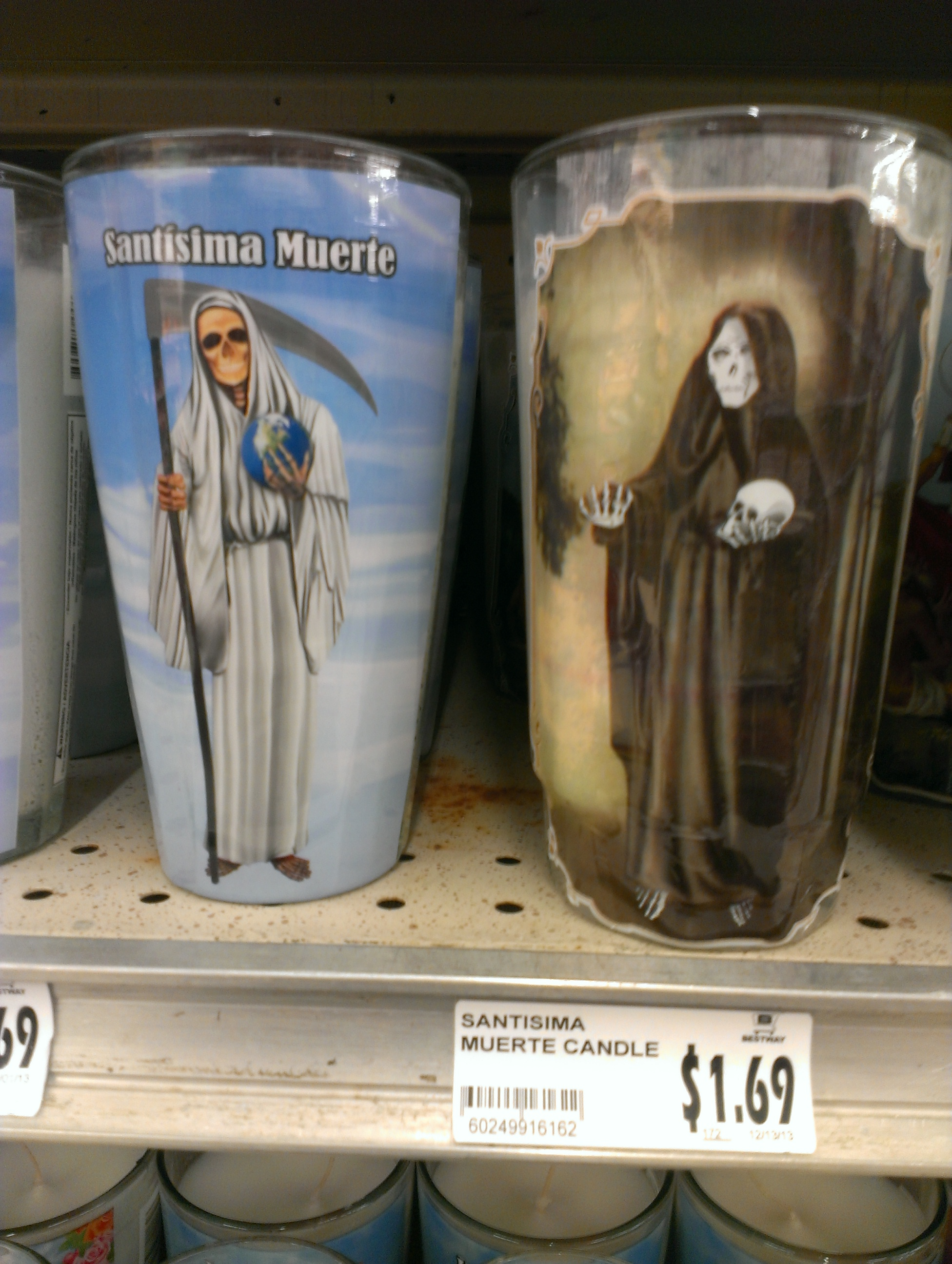
Votive candles for Santa Muerte, a Saint in Folk Catholicism

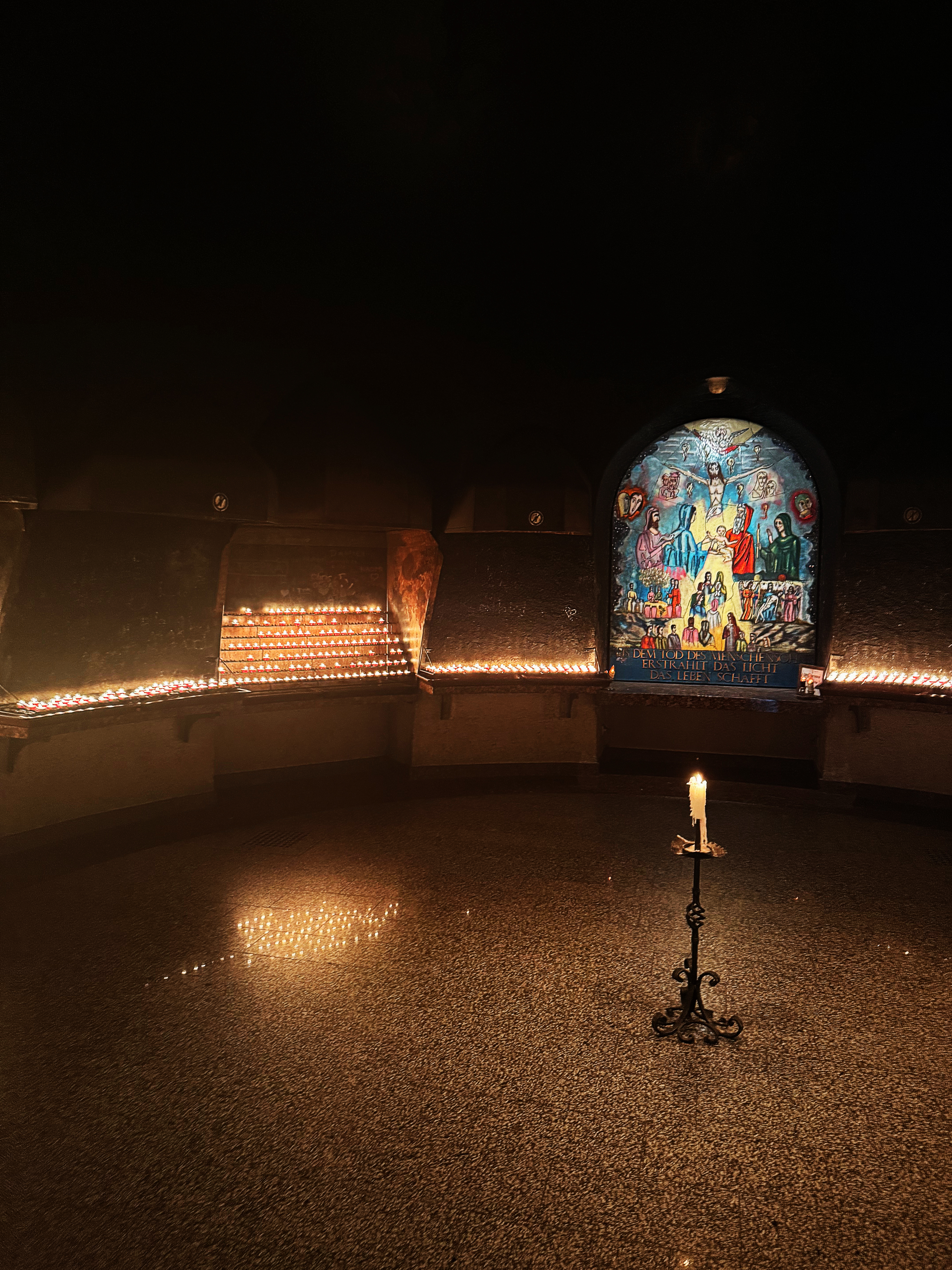
View inside the candle grotto of Mariazell Basilica

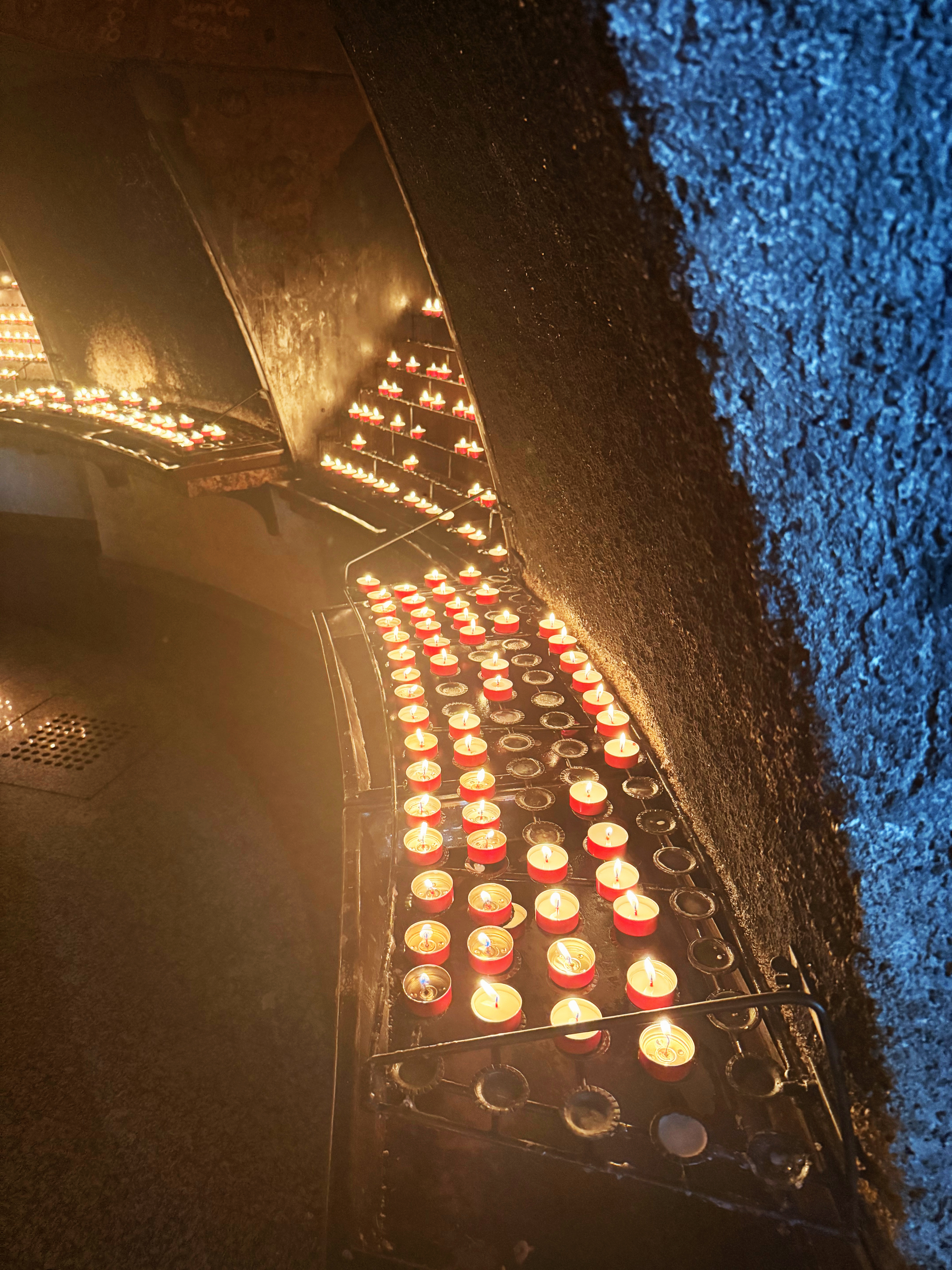
Votive candles in the candle grotto of Mariazell Basilica

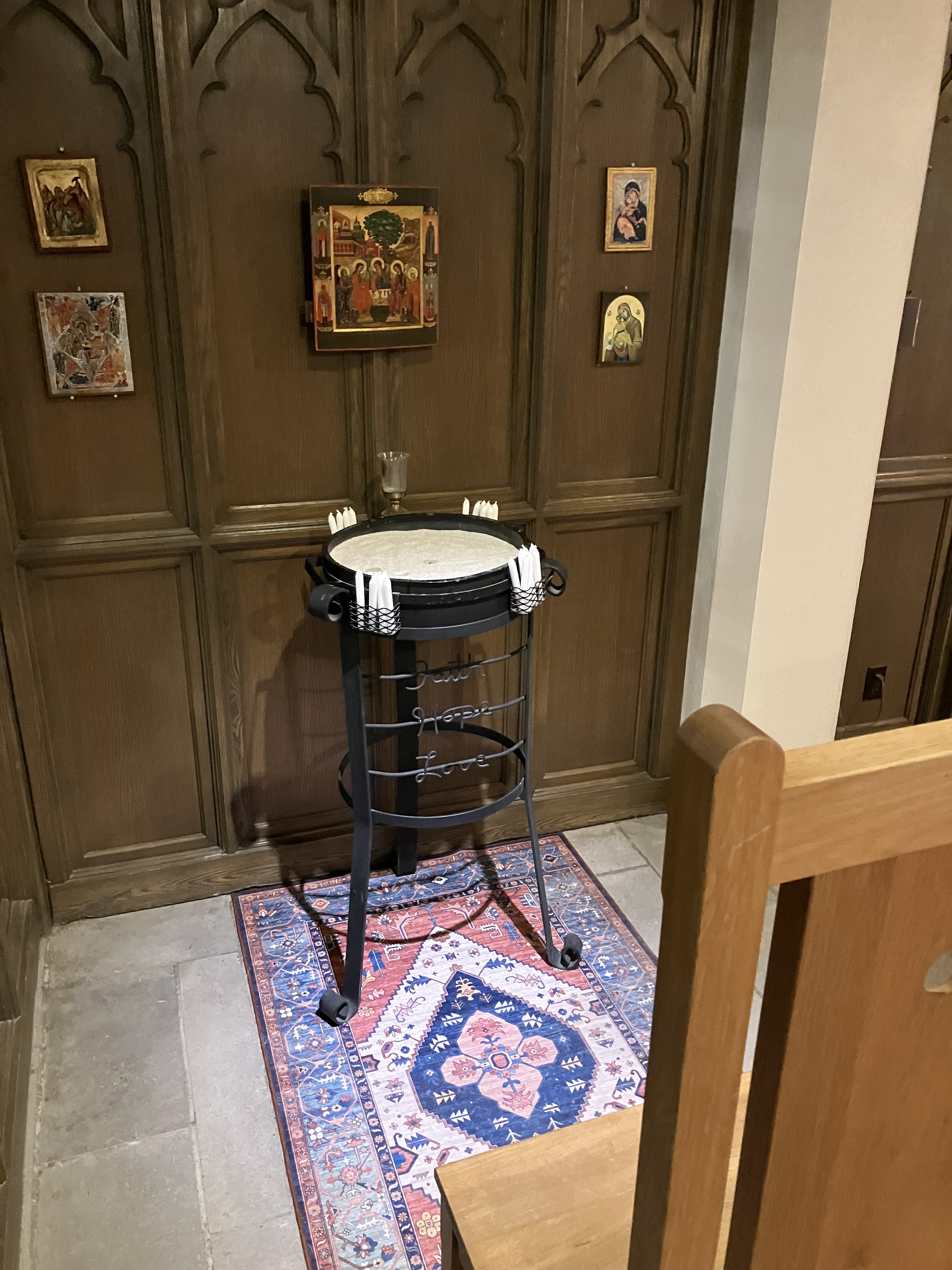
Votive Candles in an Anglican seminary

== See also ==
- Anglican devotions
- Candlemas
- Ex-voto
- Grave candle
- Holy card
- Incense
- Paschal candle
