= Ouricury wax =

Ouricury wax is a brown-colored wax obtained from the leaves of a Brazilian feather palm Syagrus coronata by scraping the leaf surface.

== Harvesting ==
Harvesting ouricury wax is more difficult than harvesting carnauba wax, as ouricury wax does not flake off the surface of the leaves.

== Properties and uses ==
The physical properties of ouricury wax resemble carnauba wax, so it can be used as a substitute where light color is not required, e.g. in carbon paper inks, molding lubricants and polishes. Its melting point is 81-84 °C.
