= Peat wax =

Hydrocarbon wax substance

Peat wax is a dark waxy substance extracted from peat using organic solvents. It is very similar to the coal-derived Montan wax and therefore has similar properties and uses. Raw peat wax is typically a mixture of three primary components, namely asphalt, resins and wax.
