= Candelilla wax =

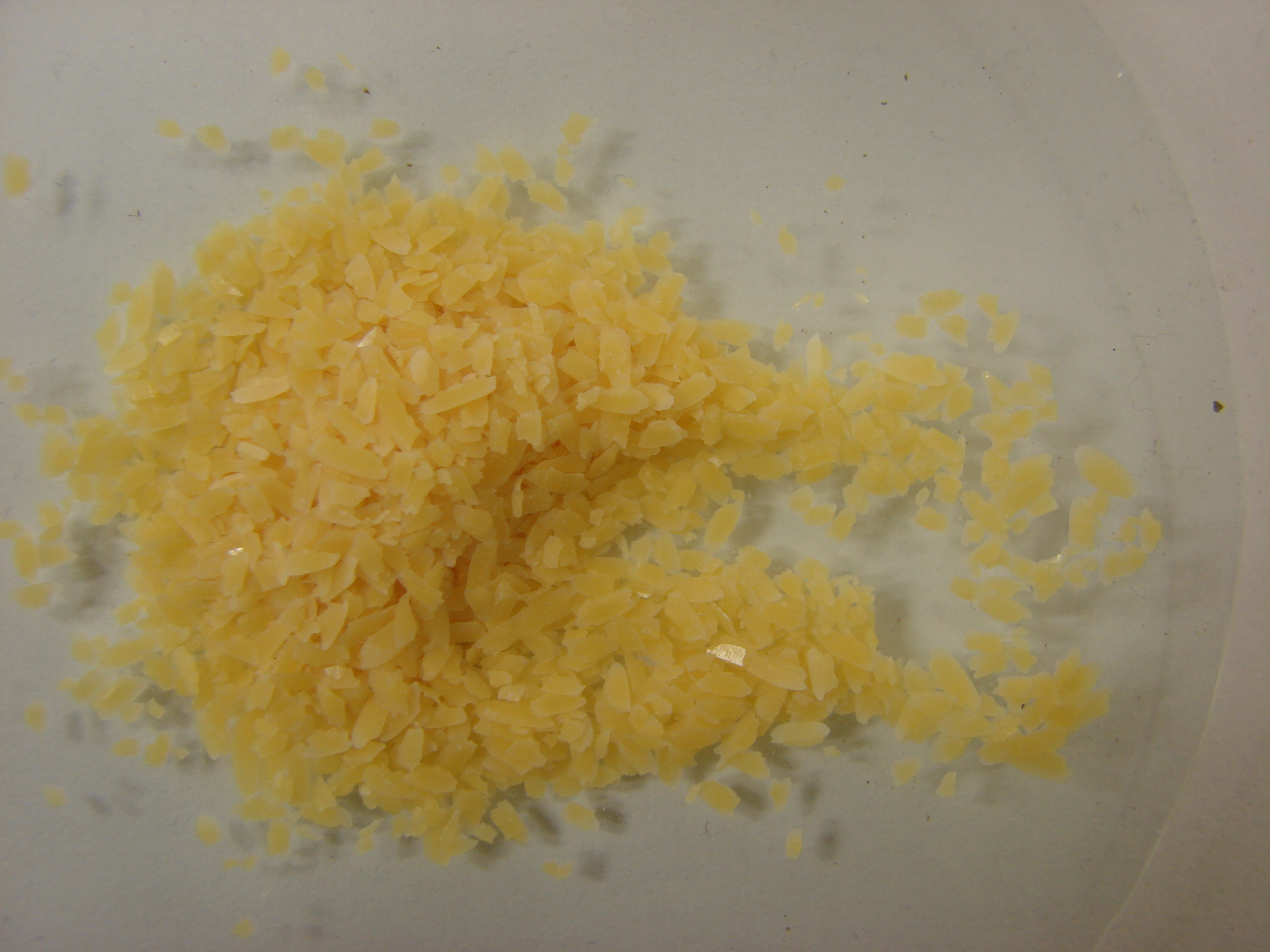

Names
- Other names: E902

Identifiers
CAS Number	8006-44-8
ECHA InfoCard	100.029.404
EC Number	232-347-0
E number	E902 (glazing agents, ...)
UNII	WL0328HX19
CompTox Dashboard (EPA)	DTXSID90894617

Properties
Melting point	68.5–72.5 °C (155.3–162.5 °F; 341.6–345.6 K)
Boiling point	> 240 °C (464 °F)
Solubility in water	Insoluble

Hazards
- Lethal dose or concentration (LD, LC)
LD_{50} (median dose)	> 5000 mg/kg (rat, oral)
- Except where otherwise noted, data are given for materials in their standard state (at 25 °C [77 °F], 100 kPa). Infobox references

Candelilla wax is a wax derived from the leaves of the small candelilla shrub native to northern Mexico and the southwestern United States, Euphorbia antisyphilitica, from the family Euphorbiaceae. It is yellowish-brown, hard, brittle, aromatic, and opaque to translucent.

== Composition and production ==
With a melting point of 68.5–72.5 °C (155–162 °F), candelilla wax consists of mainly hydrocarbons (about 50%, chains with 29–33 carbons), esters of higher molecular weight (20–29%), free acids (7–9%), and resins (12–14%, mainly triterpenoid esters). The high hydrocarbon content distinguishes this wax from carnauba wax. It is insoluble in water, but soluble in many organic solvents such as acetone, chloroform, benzene, and turpentine.

The wax is obtained by boiling the leaves and stems with dilute sulfuric acid, and the resulting "cerote" is skimmed from the surface and further processed. In this way, about 900 tons are produced annually.

== Uses ==
It is mostly used mixed with other waxes to harden them without raising their melting point. As a food additive, candelilla wax has the E number E 902 and is used as a glazing agent. It also finds use in the cosmetic industry, as a component of lip balms and lotion bars. One of its major uses is as a binder for chewing gums.

Candelilla wax can be used as a substitute for carnauba wax and beeswax. It is also used for making varnish.
