= Soy candle =

Common candle type

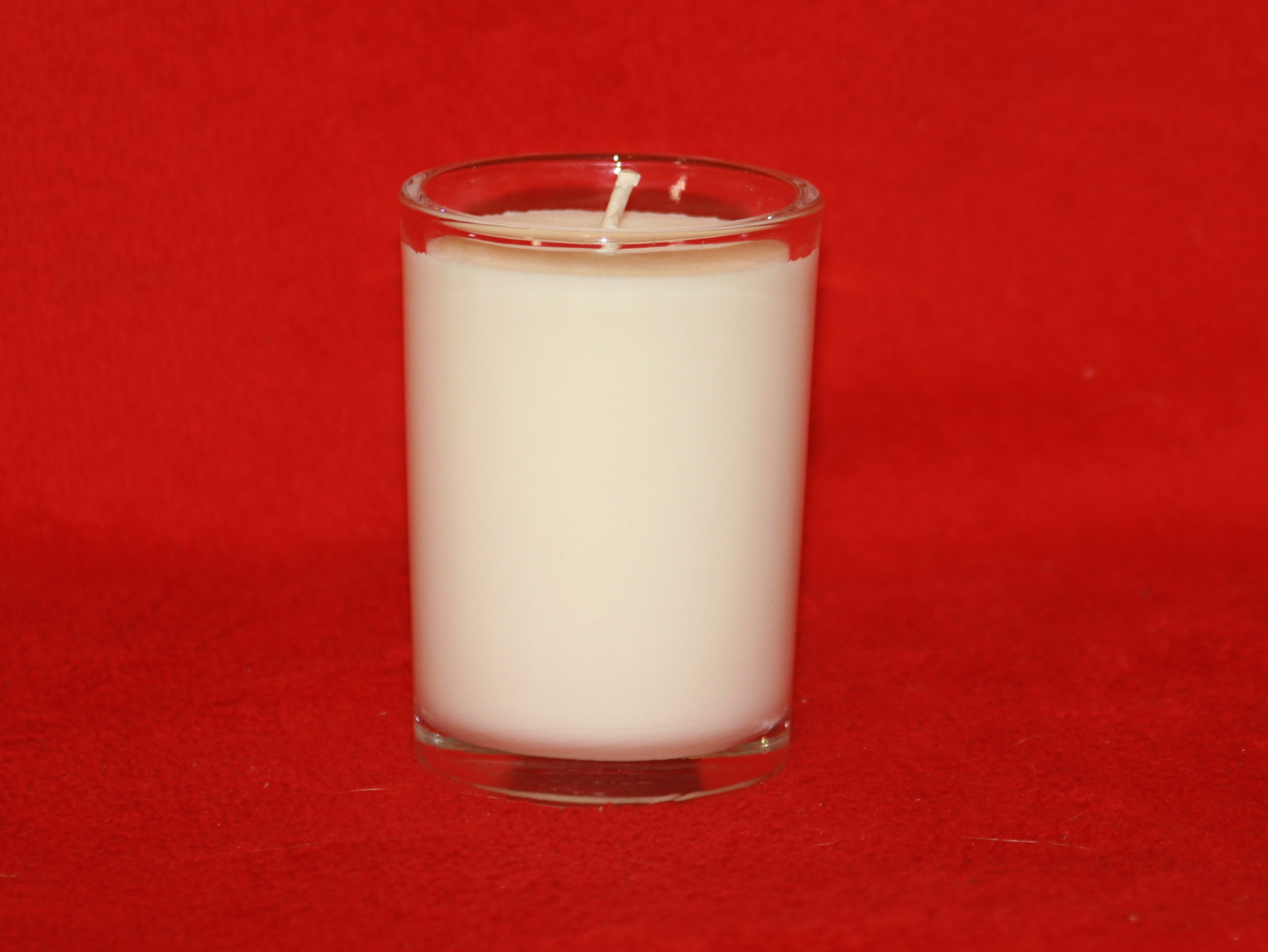
Plain soy candle

Soy candles are candles made from soy wax, which is a processed form of soybean oil. They are usually container candles because soy wax typically has a lower melting point than traditional waxes, but can also be made into pillar candles if certain additives are mixed into the soy wax.

== Soy wax ==
Soy wax is made by the full hydrogenation of soybean oil; this process transforms naturally occurring triglycerides fatty acid tails towards a high proportion of stearic acid. This wax is typically softer than paraffin and with a lower melting temperature, in most combinations. However, additives can raise this melting point to temperatures typical for paraffin-based candles. The melting point ranges from 49 to 82 degrees Celsius (120 to 179 degrees Fahrenheit), depending on the blend. The density of soy wax is about 90% that of water or 0.9 g/ml. This means nine pounds (144 oz) of wax will fill about ten 16-oz jars (160 fluid ounces of volume). Soy wax is available in flake and pellet form and has an off-white, opaque appearance. Its lower melting temperature can mean that candles will melt in hot weather. Since soy wax is usually used in container candles, this is not much of an issue.

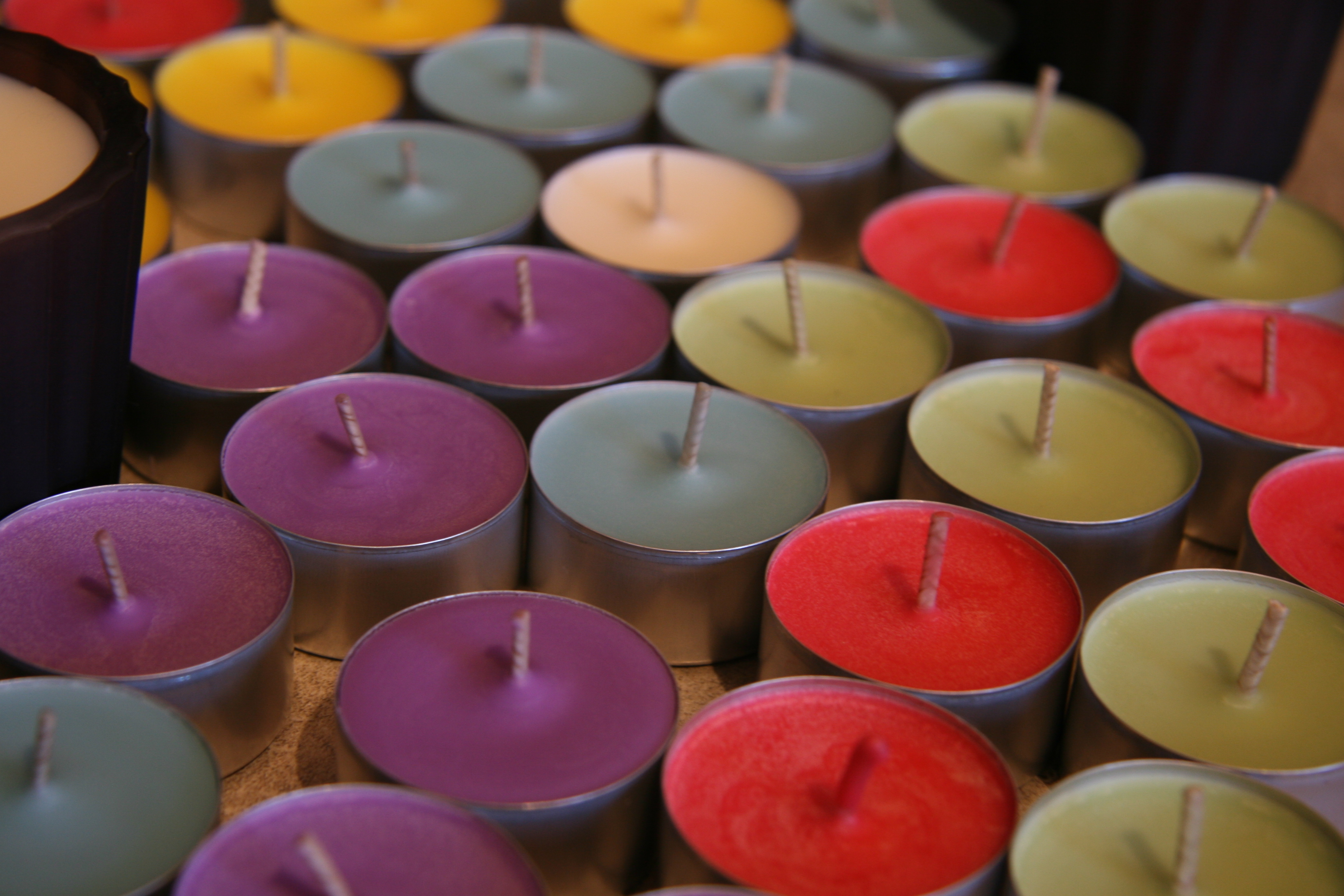
Soy tealights

Some soy candles may be made up of a blend of different waxes, including beeswax, paraffin, or palm wax.

== Soy candles ==
Soy candles distribute fragrances slightly less intensely than paraffin candles, so paraffin is sometimes blended with soy to improve scent throw and burn quality in warmer climates. Soy wax is preferred in many cases because it burns cleaner, slower, and is considered more environmentally friendly. A USDA-funded initiative supports the development of soy-based candles as sustainable alternatives to petroleum-derived waxes.

Many soy candles are blended with coconut wax due to its softer structure, which increases melt pool size and scent diffusion.

Soy wax typically produces fewer indoor pollutants than paraffin and is easier to biodegrade.
