= Montan wax =

Hard wax obtained by solvent extraction of certain types of lignite or brown coal

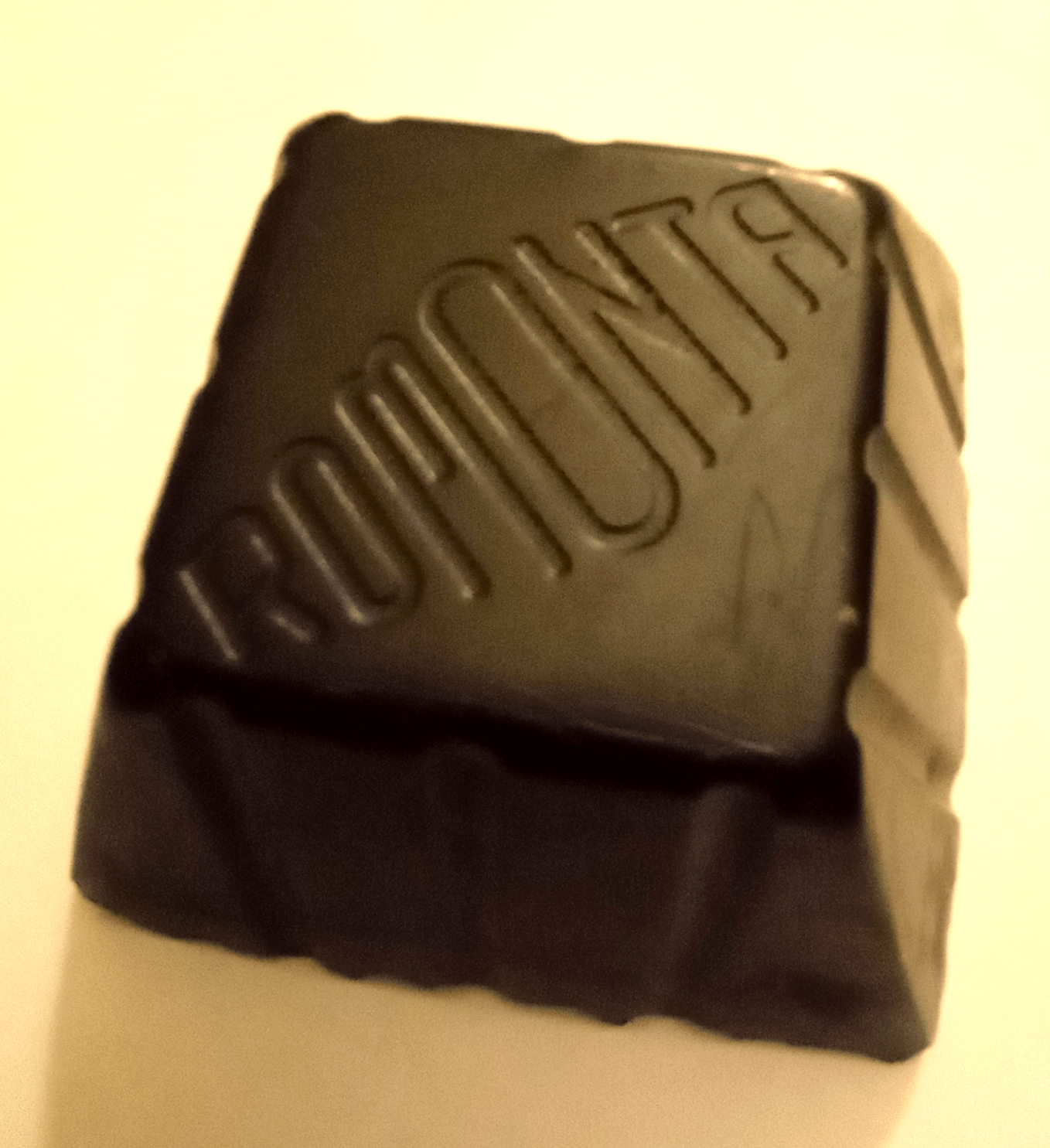
A block of montan wax embossed with the mark of ROMONTA GmbH

Montan wax, also known as lignite wax or OP wax, is a hard wax obtained by solvent extraction of certain types of lignite or brown coal. Commercially viable deposits exist in only a few locations, including Amsdorf, Germany, and in the Ione Basin near Ione, California. High-graded lignite wax are also found in Yunnan and Jilin, China.

== Properties ==
Its color ranges from dark brown to light yellow when crude, or white when refined. Its composition is non-glyceride long-chain (C_{24}–C_{30}) carboxylic acid esters (62–68 weight %), free long-chain organic acids (22–26%), long-chain alcohols, ketones, and hydrocarbons (7–15%), and resins; it is in effect a fossilized plant wax. Its melting range is 82–95 °C (180–203 °F).

== Uses ==
It is used for making car and shoe polishes, paints, and phonograph records, musical instrument polish and as lubricant for moulding paper and plastics. About a third of total world production is used in car polish. Formerly, its main use was making carbon paper. Unrefined montan wax contains asphalt and resins, which can be removed by refining. Montan wax in polishes improves scuff resistance, increases water repellence, and imparts high gloss.
