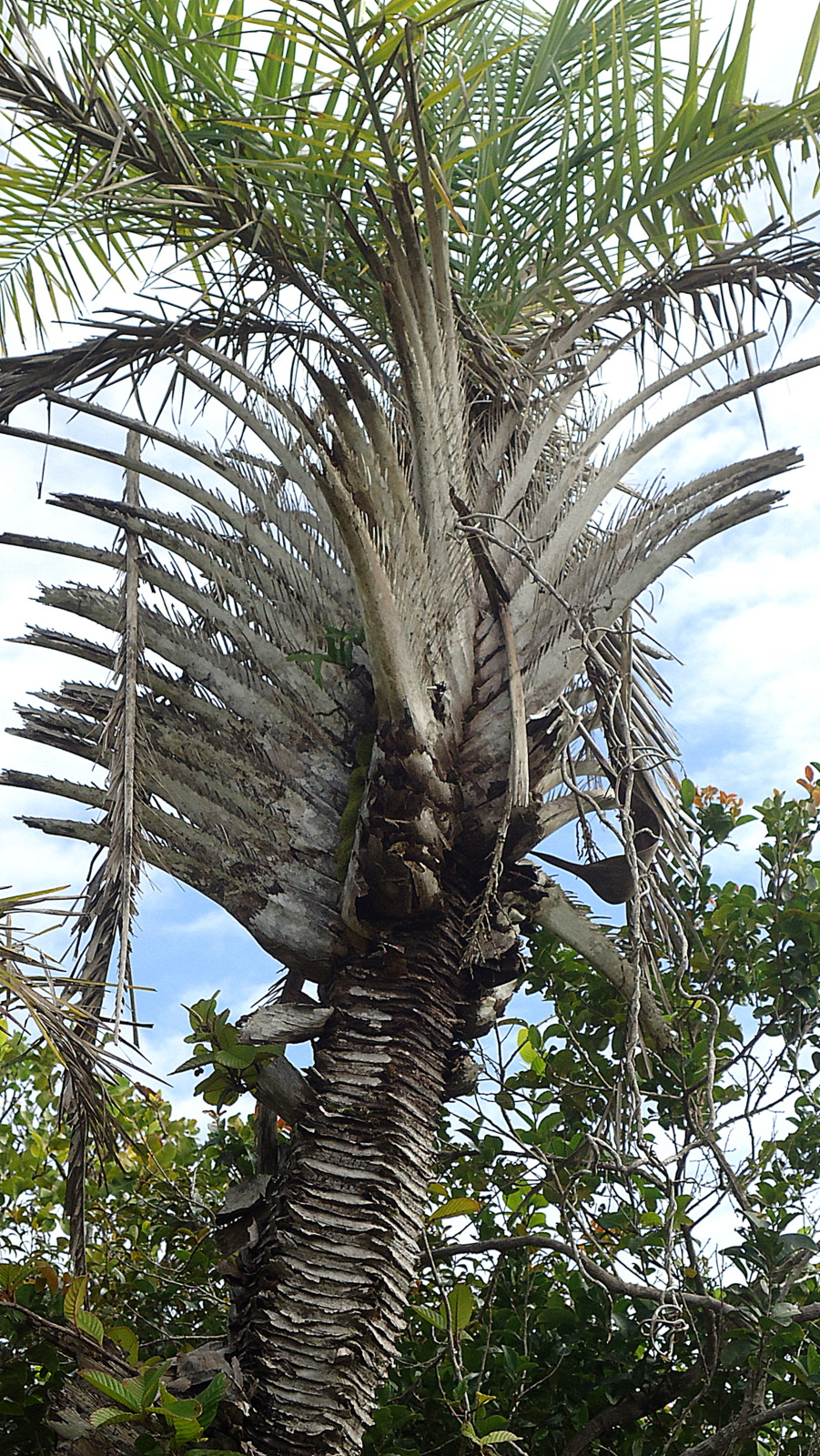

Conservation status
- Least Concern (IUCN 3.1)

Scientific classification
- Kingdom: Plantae
- Clade: Tracheophytes
- Clade: Angiosperms
- Clade: Monocots
- Clade: Commelinids
- Order: Arecales
- Family: Arecaceae
- Genus: Syagrus
- Species: S. coronata

Binomial name
- Syagrus coronata (Mart.) Becc.

Synonyms
- Cocos coronata Mart.; Calappa coronata (Mart.) Kuntze; Cocos quinquefaria Barb.Rodr.; Glaziova treubiana Becc.; Syagrus quinquefaria (Barb.Rodr.) Becc.; Syagrus treubiana (Becc.) Becc.

= Syagrus coronata =

Licuri palm

Species of palm

Syagrus coronata, commonly known as the ouricury palm, aricuri palm, or licuri palm, is a species of palm tree that is native to eastern Brazil, ranging from the southern part of the state of Pernambuco, into the state of Bahia, south to the Jequitinhonha River in the state of Minas Gerais. The tree can live for 30–150 years, though most only live for 8–10 years on average. It plays an important role in the diets of tropical seasonally dry forest animals.

== Description ==
Syagrus coronata reaches 3 to 12 m (9.8 to 39.4 ft) tall with a crown of semi-plumose leaves. The blooms are bright yellow, and the plants bear fruit for most of the year.

== Ecological importance ==
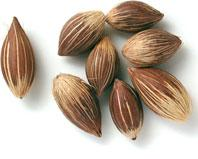
Licuri palm nuts

Licuri palm nuts are the main food source of Lear's macaw, making up around 95% of their diet. These nuts can grow to be 2.5 cm diameter. According to Kitzke and Johnson, mature C. coronata palms number about five billion (5,000,000,000).

Oil can be extracted from the fruit of the tree which contains saturated and unsaturated fatty acids. The oils have been incorporated into topical emulsions.

== Threats ==
The destruction of small seedlings by cattle poses a threat to the plants, primarily through the destruction of concentrated groves. Those groves are vital to Lear's macaw.

== Uses ==
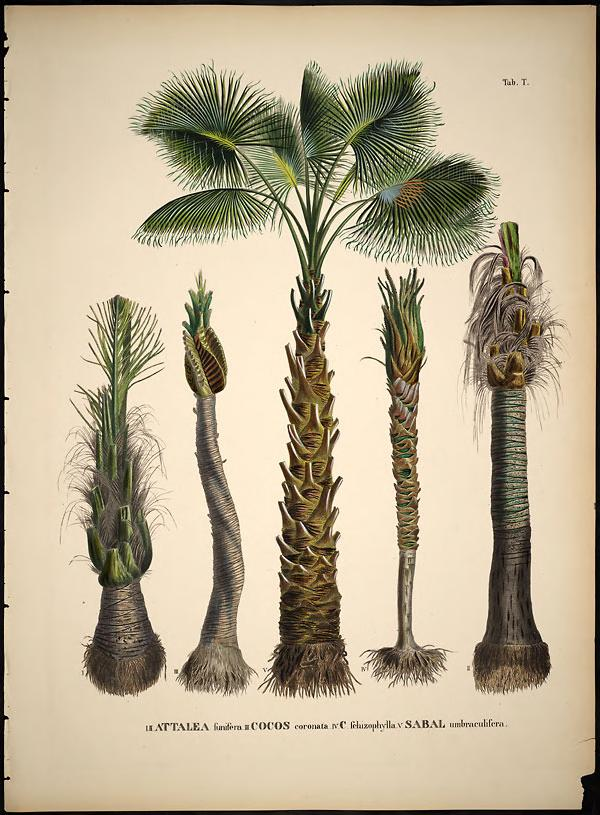
Missouri's Botanical Garden Illustration (1823-1850)

Syagrus coronata is the source of ouricury wax.

The oils containing oleic and palmitic acid have been used in topical formulations in skincare.
