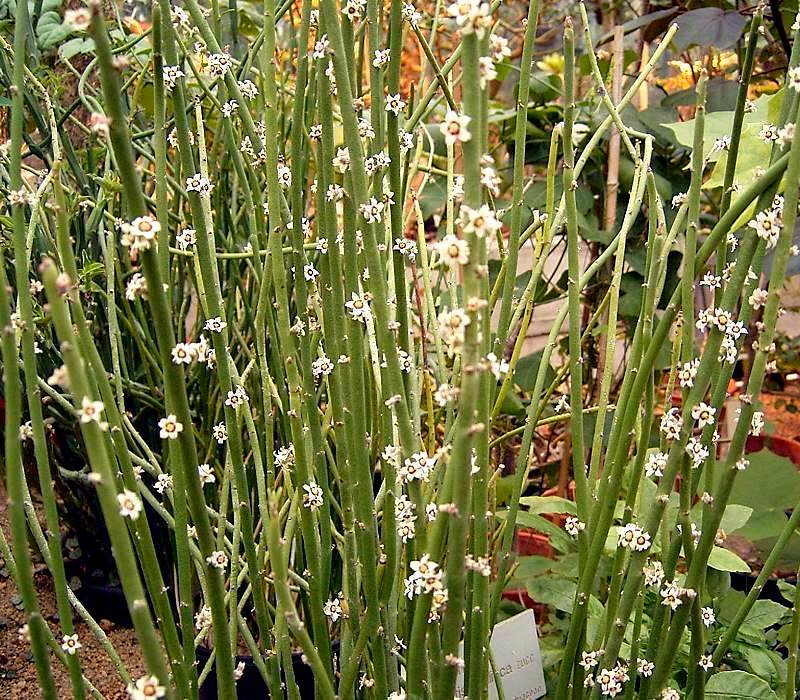

Conservation status
- CITES Appendix II (Note: Finished products containing Euphorbia antisyphilitica packaged and ready for retail trade are not subject to the provisions of CITES.)

Scientific classification
- Kingdom: Plantae
- Clade: Embryophytes
- Clade: Tracheophytes
- Clade: Angiosperms
- Clade: Eudicots
- Clade: Rosids
- Order: Malpighiales
- Family: Euphorbiaceae
- Genus: Euphorbia
- Species: E. antisyphilitica

Binomial name
- Euphorbia antisyphilitica Zucc.

Synonyms
- Euphorbia cerifera Alcocer

= Euphorbia antisyphilitica =

Species of flowering plant in the spurge family

Euphorbia antisyphilitica is a species of flowering plant in the spurge family Euphorbiaceae. It is native to the Trans-Pecos of Texas and southern New Mexico in the United States as well as Chihuahua, Coahuila, Hidalgo, and Querétaro in Mexico. Common names include candelilla and wax plant, but the latter is more often applied to members of the unrelated genus Hoya. It is shrubby and has densely clustered, erect, essentially leafless stems that are covered in wax to prevent transpiration.

== Uses ==
When Joseph Gerhard Zuccarini first described E. antisyphilitica he registered a presumed alternative medicinal use of the plant for the treatment of syphilis (a sexually transmitted infection), but there is no available documentation to sustain the usage of candelilla for that purpose in indigenous communities that inhabited the territories where distribution is described. Commercial harvesting of candelilla wax began at the start of the twentieth century, with demand greatly increasing during World War I and II. This industry largely disappeared following the end of World War II due to diminished candelilla populations and the availability of cheaper petroleum-based waxes. Later on however, new uses were found for the wax mainly in the cosmetic and food industries, and it is still being produced in northern Mexico, particularly in the Mexican state of Coahuila de Zaragoza in regions of scientific, environmental and historic importance such as Cuatro Ciénegas de Carranza, being exported to other countries.

== Cultivation ==
Candelilla is gaining in popularity as a landscape plant in parts of the arid US southwest. It is popular for the following reasons:

- Once established, it needs little water other than rainfall in cities such as Phoenix or Tucson, making it a good roadway median planting.
- It can survive in areas that have reflected light.
- It grows best in well-drained soils but can tolerate some clay or limestone.
- It is visited by butterflies, although not commonly considered a "butterfly plant."
- It is cold-tolerant to 15 degrees F.
- It appears not to be bothered by pests.
- It can be grown in containers.

== Conservation ==
E. antisyphilitica is protected under Appendix II of the Convention on International Trade in Endangered Species (CITES) meaning CITES permits/certificates are normally required for international export/import of the species (including parts and derivatives).
