= Mediterranean cetaceans =

Marine mammals of the Mediterranean Sea

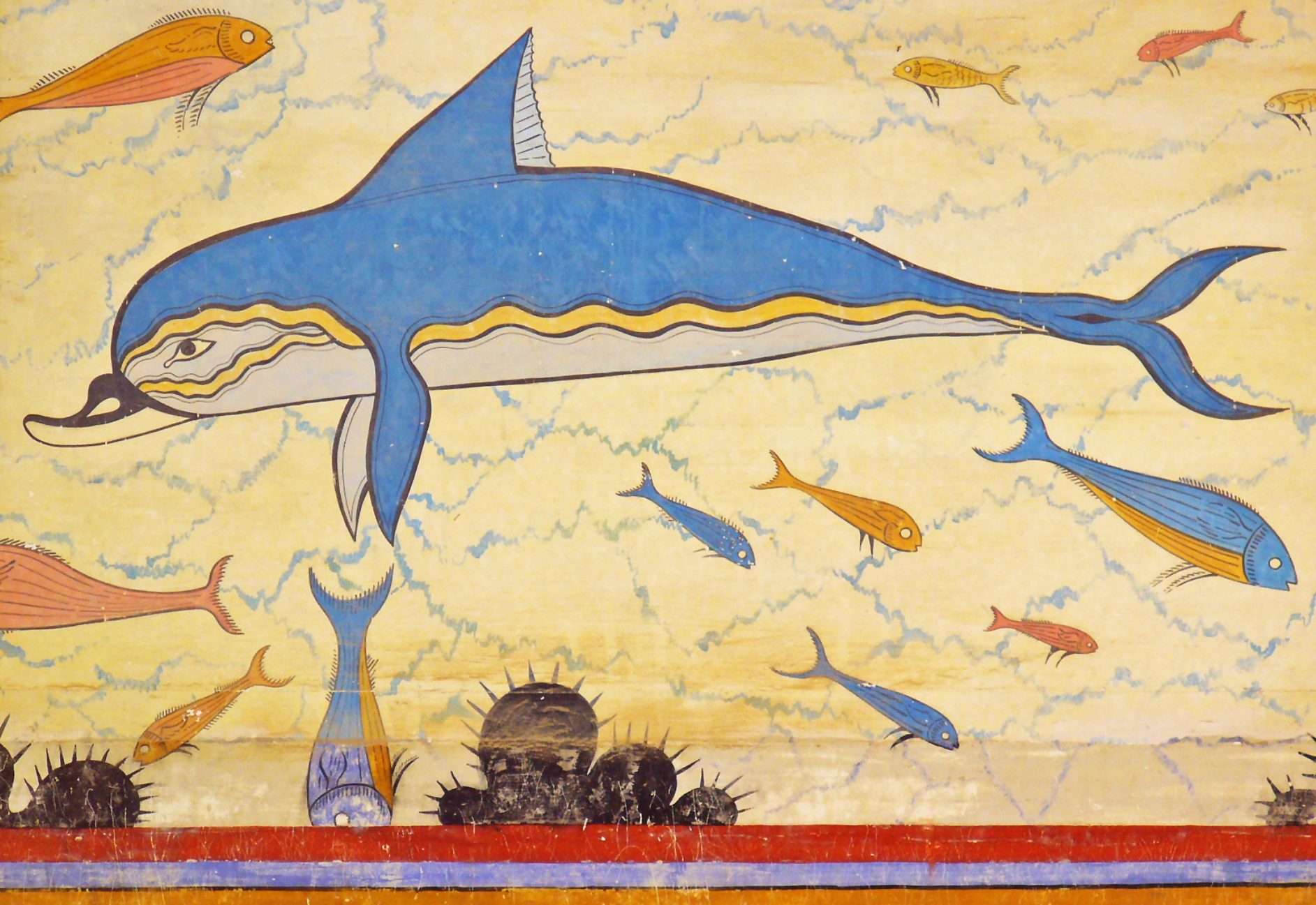
Minoan depiction of a common dolphin in the "Dolphin Fresco" in the Palace of Knossos (Crete), circa 2,000 BC.

Mediterranean cetaceans constitute a unique assemblage of species found in the virtually closed basin of the Mediterranean Sea. This assemblage differs from those found in the North Atlantic or the Red Sea. In the Mediterranean, cetaceans are represented by around twenty species, but only eight of these are considered common: the Short-beaked dolphin, Common dolphin, Bottlenose dolphin, Risso's dolphin, Long-finned pilot whale, Cuvier's beaked whale, Sperm whale and Fin whale. Their distribution varies greatly from region to region, and their abundance and diversity seem to be greatest in the Corso-Liguro-Provençal basin, where cetaceans have been protected by the Pelagos Sanctuary since 2002.

Renowned for their intelligence, which in some respects is similar to that of humans, cetaceans are the focus of protection measures that are all the more important given that their slow life cycle makes them vulnerable to the many threats that affect them in the Mediterranean. Indeed, the density of human settlement and traffic in the Mediterranean basin exposes marine species, and particularly large marine mammals such as cetaceans, to numerous threats that require specific conservation measures.

== Situation ==
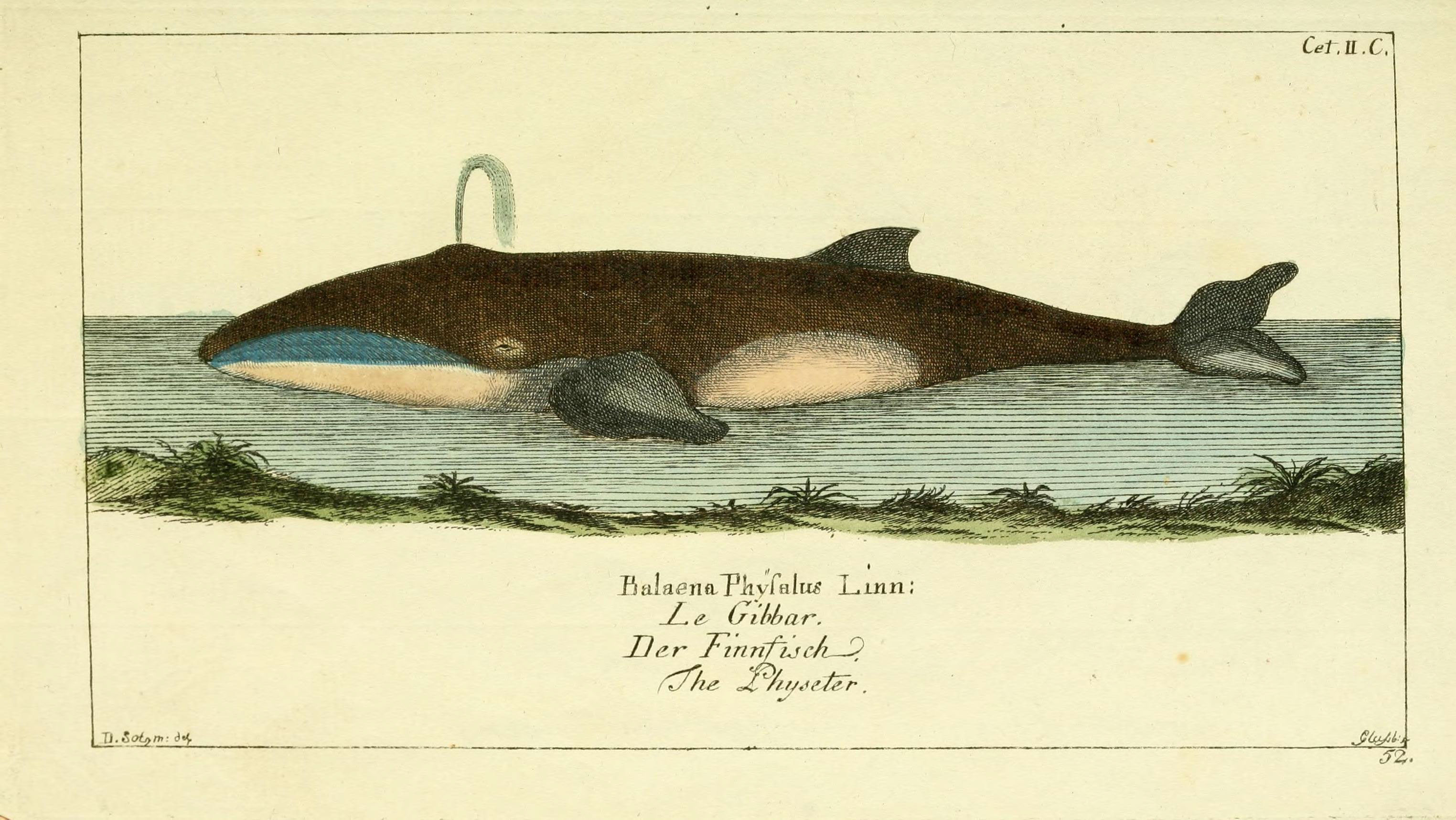
Illustration of a fin whale by D. F. Sotzmann in 1780.

=== Geography ===
Satellite image of the Mediterranean Basin.

The Mediterranean Sea is a quasi-enclosed sea, divided into four main basins: the Western Basin, the Adriatic Sea, the Central Mediterranean and the Eastern or Levantine Basin – each in turn subdivided into secondary seas. The Mediterranean is known as a very oligotrophic sea, i.e., low in nutrients (and even more so in the eastern basin): only two major rivers flow into it (the Rhone and the Nile), and its weak current limits the circulation of nutrients, particularly nitrates and phosphates. As a result, phytoplankton levels are low, and the pelagic ecosystem is less dense than in other oceanic regions. This explains why cetaceans, and whales in particular, are mainly found near rivers and outlets (Alboran Sea, Aegean Sea) and in areas where deep currents resurface, such as the Ligurian Sea.

Bordered by 23 Mediterranean countries with a coastal population of 150 million, the Mediterranean is the world's leading tourist destination and one of the planet's main commercial shipping lanes, handling a quarter of the world's commercial traffic and a third of its oil traffic. As a result, pollution and nuisance are high, and collisions between ships and cetaceans are commonplace.

=== History ===
Cetaceans, and dolphins in particular, have been familiar to Mediterranean populations since antiquity. They are depicted in bestiaries, as well as in mythology, and appear as early as the 2nd millennium BC on the frescoes of the Minoan palace at Knossos, Crete. The philosopher Aristotle, in the 4th century B.C., devoted lengthy studies to cetaceans, establishing that they are indeed air-breathing mammals that incubate their young with a placenta before nursing them. Several other naturalists, such as Pliny the Elder, have provided very detailed descriptions and numerous anecdotes concerning these animals, attesting to their assiduous frequentation and mutual curiosity.

In particular, dolphins enjoyed a very positive image in seafaring civilizations such as the Greeks and Romans: a constellation was named after them, they were seen as cheerful companions of sailors, and it is said that they sometimes rescued shipwrecked sailors, as did the poet Arion of Methymne.

Whales, on the other hand, are less familiar to sailors and more intimidating, inspiring fear above all on account of their oversized mouths, and most mentions of them in ancient literature tell stories of devouring by the terrifying monster ketos/cetus (like Jonah in the Bible or Lucian of Samosata in his True Stories), a theme much taken up in both the Middle Ages and the Classical period and which we encounter right up to the 19th century with the story of Pinocchio.

Some archaeological data suggest that cetaceans may have been hunted and consumed during the Roman period, but this seems to have remained fairly localized, and there is no historical record of significant fishing of these animals in the Mediterranean (unlike the Atlantic, where the Basques, for example, hunted cetaceans intensively as early as the Middle Ages). Mediterranean whales are essentially rorquals ("skinny" whales): during the most intense period of industrial whaling (late 19th and early 20th centuries), right whales (cold-water whales, for their blubber) were the main target, so this activity had less impact on the Mediterranean basin. However, several species disappeared from the Mediterranean during historic times (notably the harbour porpoise and the grey whale), and it is still difficult to determine the exact causes and mechanisms leading to these disappearances.

== List of species ==
Cetaceans, from their scientific name Cetacea (from ancient Greek κῆτος / kêtos, "cetacean"), form an infra-order of aquatic mammals, classified in the order Artiodactyla, where their closest cousins are the hippopotamuses: like all mammals, they breathe air and nurse their young, despite their exclusive adaptation to the marine environment, which has notably caused them to lose most of their hair and their hind limbs. In 2020, some 86 cetacean species were known worldwide, a number of which are endemic to freshwater or polar waters. These highly charismatic mammals are reputed to have remarkable intelligence, which contributes to their popular success and hence to the desire to protect them.

Twenty cetacean species have been officially recorded in the Mediterranean (and as many as twenty-four counting old or doubtful records), but only eighteen are part of the stable population, of which only eight are considered common: Striped dolphin (Stenella coeruleoalba), Short-beaked common dolphin (Delphinus delphis), Bottlenose dolphin (Tursiops truncatus), Risso's dolphin (Grampus griseus), pilot whale (Globicephala melas), Cuvier's beaked whale (Ziphius cavirostris), sperm whale (Physeter macrocephalus) and fin whale (Balaenoptera physalus). Their distribution is highly heterogeneous from region to region, depending in particular on nutrient load and depth, with, for example, cetaceans that are rare in the Adriatic and abundant in the Ligurian and Alboran Seas.

Today's Mediterranean cetacean population is the result of a constantly evolving history. Some species, such as the harbour porpoise, disappeared in historical times due to human influence, while others, such as the Indian Ocean humpback dolphin (Sousa plumbea), could colonize the area thanks to the Suez Canal. On larger time scales, many other species that are now extinct or exiled have inhabited this basin, with significant changes in response to geological changes such as the Messinian salinity crisis.

=== Mysticetes (baleen whales) ===
==== Fin whale (Balaenoptera physalus) ====
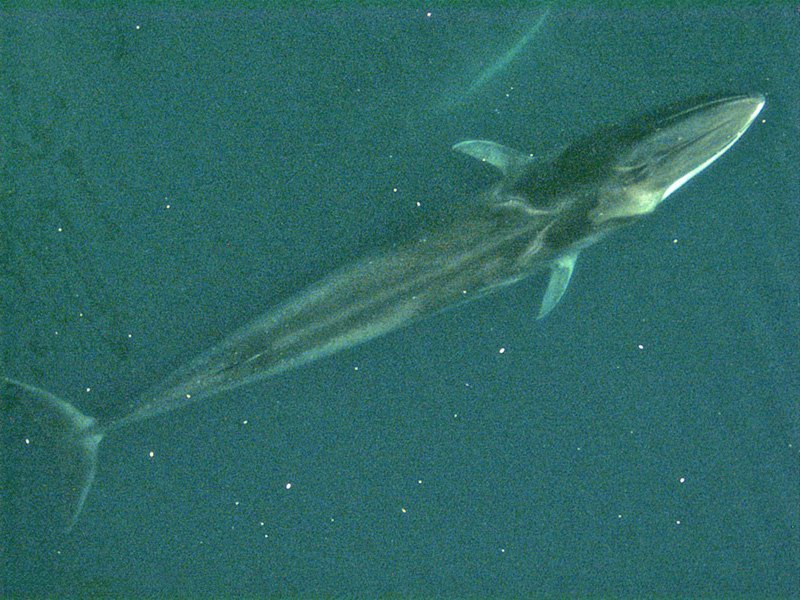
Fin whale (Balaenoptera physalus).

The fin whale (Balaenoptera physalus) is the only baleen whale species with a significant resident population in the Mediterranean, mainly located in the northern half of the western basin, between Spain, France and Italy. It is the second largest animal on our planet after the Blue whale (B. musculus), reaching 22 m in length and weighing 70 tonnes. In the Mediterranean, it feeds almost exclusively on Meganyctiphanes norvegica, the Mediterranean krill.

They are found singly or in small groups, mainly offshore and especially in the western Mediterranean, where they do not go beyond Crete. A large proportion of individuals migrate to the Ligurian Sea in summer and return south and east in winter. The Mediterranean population is estimated at between 1,500 and 2,000 individuals, including 650 in the Pelagos Sanctuary, and appears to be only weakly connected to the Atlantic population.

The fin whale is classified as "vulnerable" on the IUCN Red List.

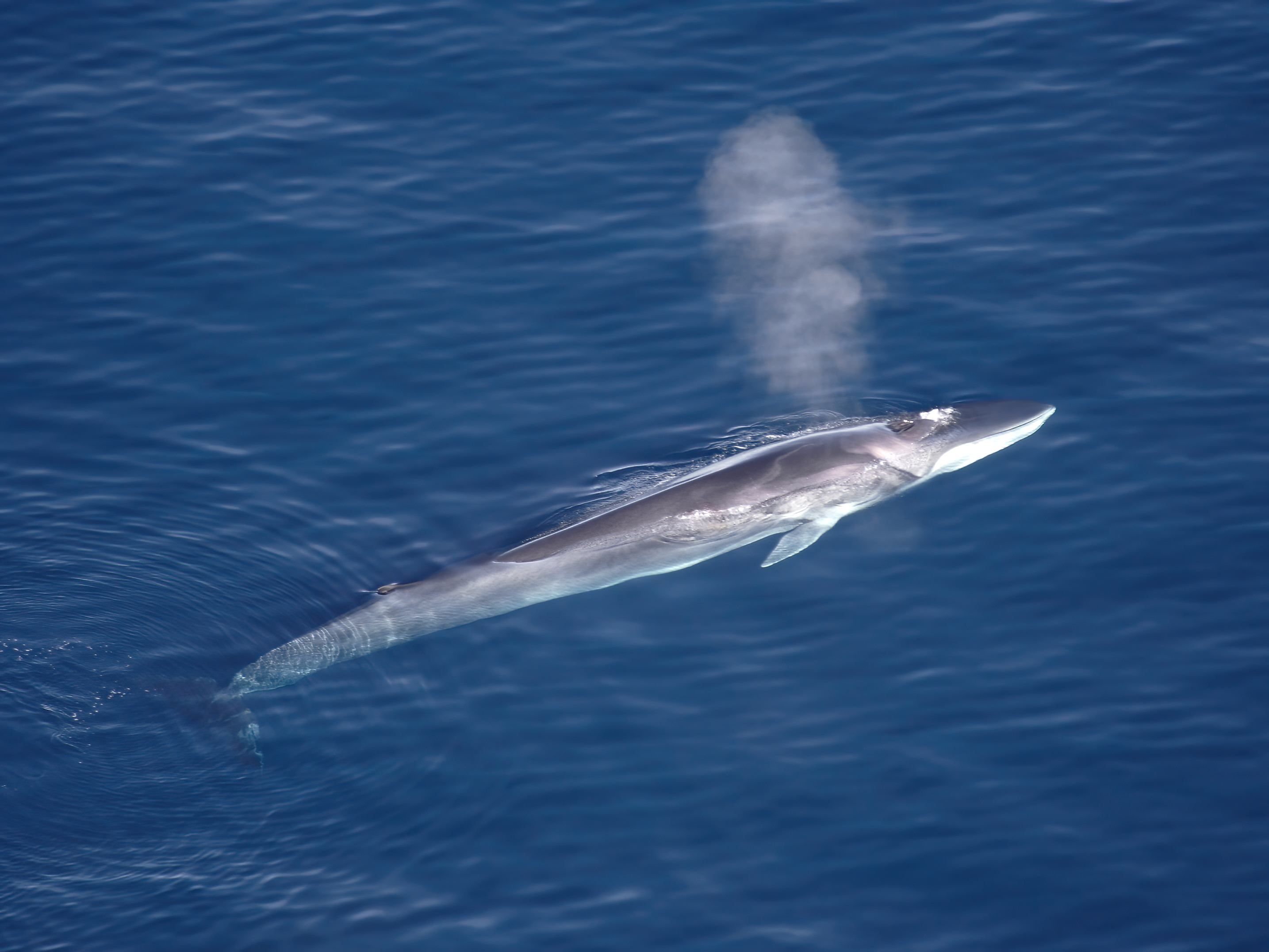

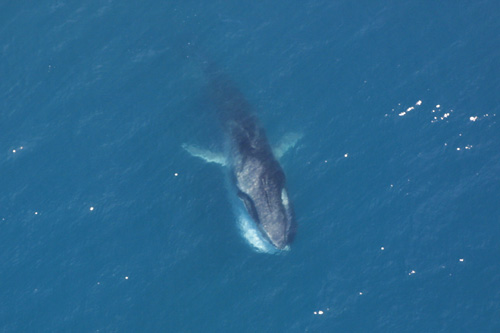

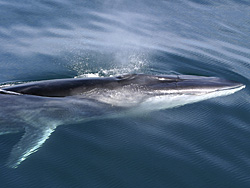

==== Minke whale (Balaenoptera acutorostrata) ====
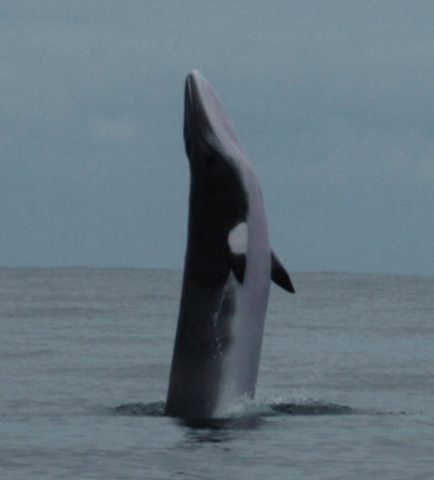
Minke whale (Balaenoptera acutorostrata).

The Minke whale (Balaenoptera acutorostrata), also known as the Minke Whale, is a small whale (7 to 9 m) with a pointed, keeled snout. It's a curious species that likes to spend its time on the coast.

This species is rare in the Mediterranean (mainly reported in the western half, very sporadically), and its presence may be largely due to incursions of specimens from the Atlantic, where it is abundant. However, it seems to be observed at least once a year on average in the Mediterranean, and particularly in France east of the Rhône, and especially in the Pelagos Sanctuary.

==== Sei whale (Balaenoptera borealis) ====
The sei whale, or Rudolph's whale (Balaenoptera borealis), lives mainly in the North Atlantic and avoids enclosed seas, but occasionally makes incursions into the Mediterranean, although this is considered exceptional and restricted to Spain and France.

The sei whale is classified as "endangered" on the IUCN Red List.

==== Humpback whale (Megaptera novaeangliae) ====
The humpback whale (Megaptera novaeangliae), also known as the Jubarte or Megaptera, is a migratory whale related to the rorquals, considered very rare in the Mediterranean, where its presence is probably due to occasional incursions of Atlantic specimens, mainly in the north of the western basin. However, it seems to be observed at least once a year on average, and this figure may be rising.

==== Grey whale (Eschrichtius robustus) ====
The gray whale (Eschrichtius robustus) is a species of whale related to the rorqual whales that has been eradicated from the Atlantic by fishing, and now survives only in the North Pacific. Nevertheless, adventurous or stray individuals occasionally reach the Atlantic Ocean, and some have been observed as far south as the Mediterranean, where conditions do not seem to allow their survival. However, this remains exceptional and generally concerns disoriented, sick or dying individuals, of whom only two have been identified with any certainty in the 21st century (in 2010 and in 2021).

Archaeological evidence suggests that the Spanish and Catalan coasts of the Mediterranean were home to a resident population of grey whales in Roman times.

=== Odontocetes (dolphins, killer whales and toothed whales) ===
==== Delphinidae (dolphins and orcas) ====
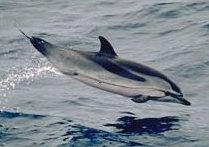
Blue and white dolphin (Stenella coeruleoalba).

==== Blue and white (striped) dolphin (Stenella coeruleoalba) ====
The Striped dolphin (Stenella coeruleoalba) is one of the most common dolphin species in the Mediterranean: ships encounter an average of one every 4 km (or rather a group of ten every 39 km).

It's a small dolphin, measuring around 2 m and weighing 80 to 100 kg, and feeds on fish and squid. They tend to live offshore (45 km from the coast on average), in groups of ten to thirty individuals, sometimes more, throughout most of the Mediterranean basin, with the exception of the Aegean Sea. They often like to be "pushed" by the bows of boats, which is one of the most frequent modes of encounter. This dolphin is absent from the Black Sea.

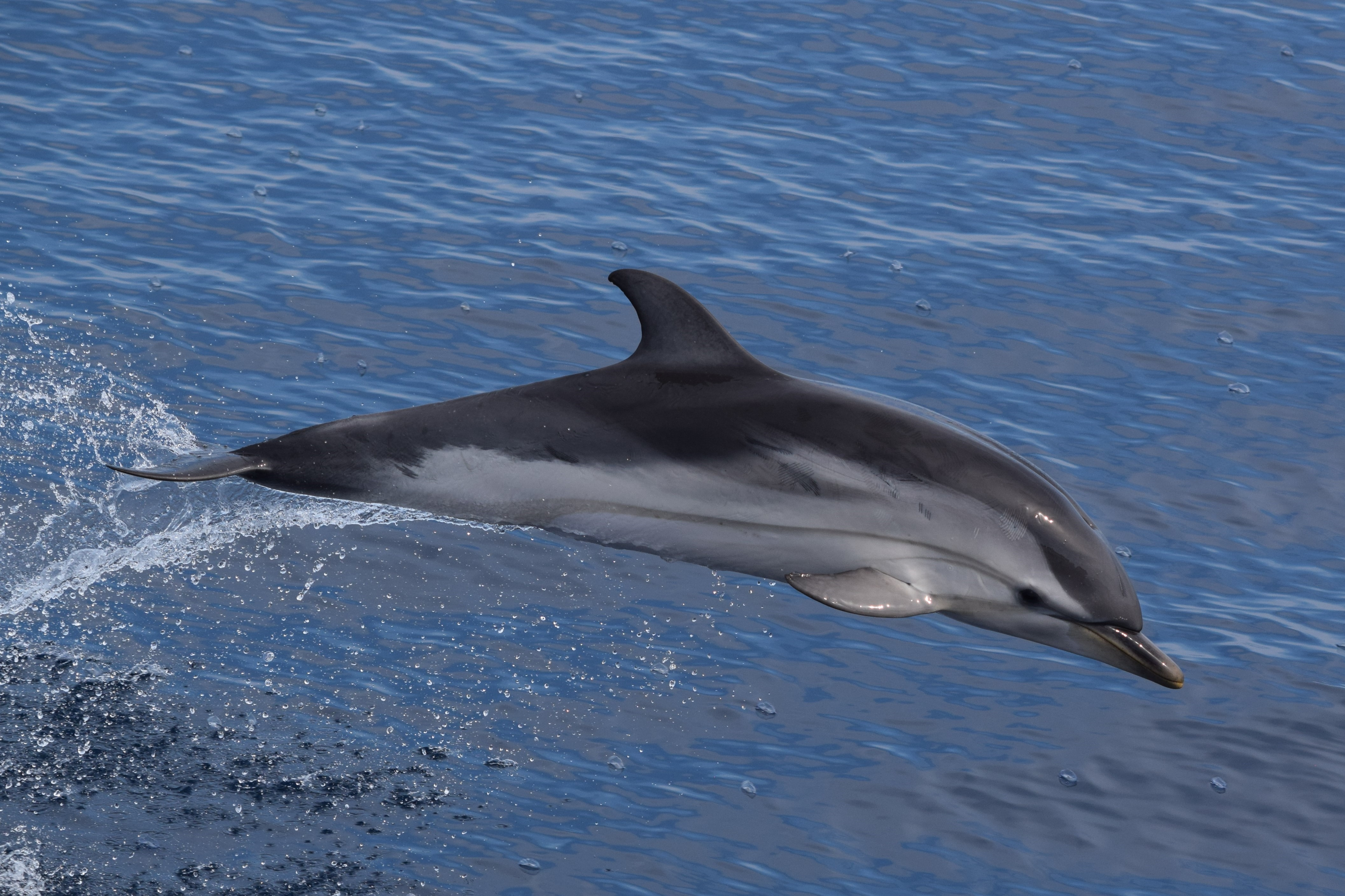

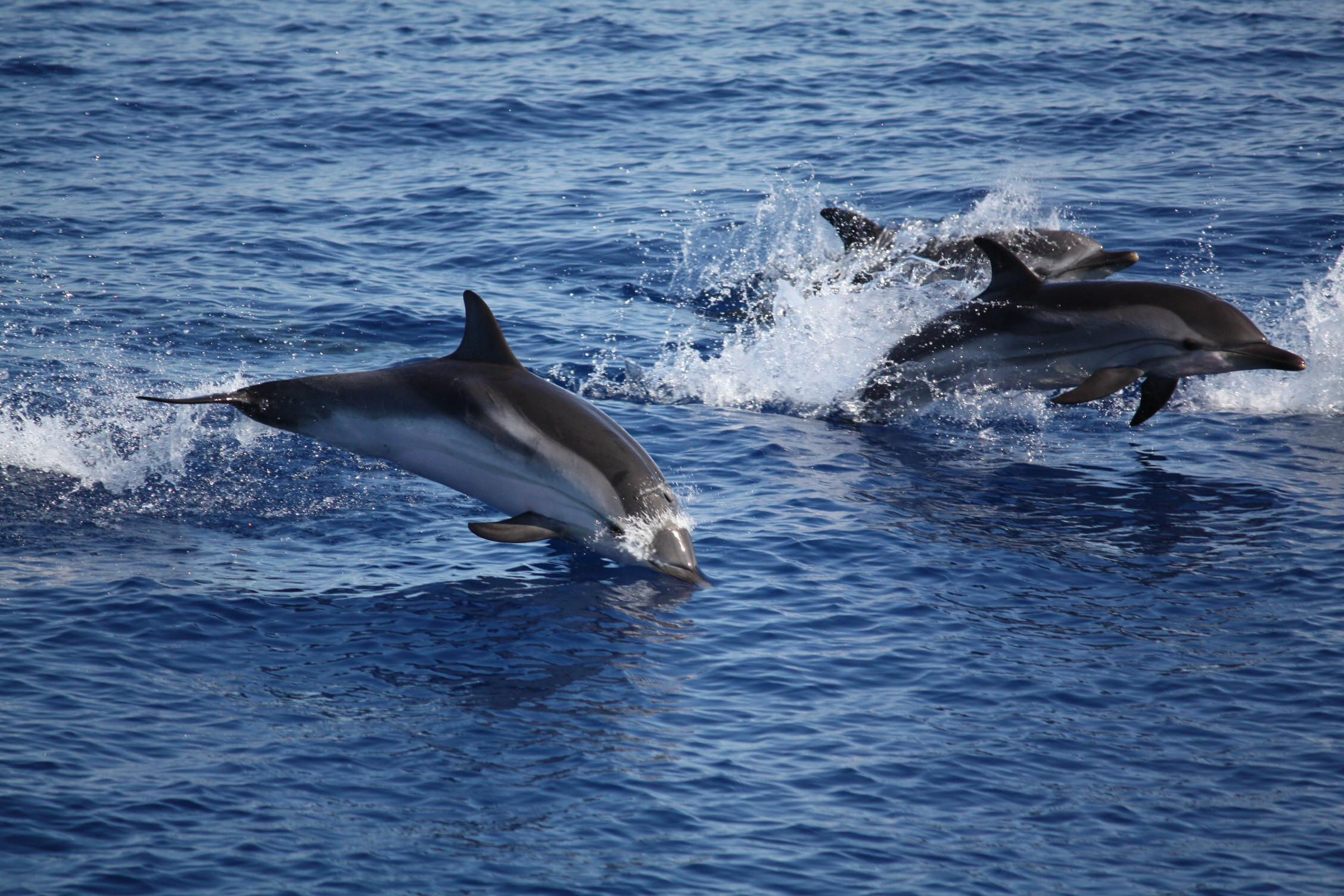

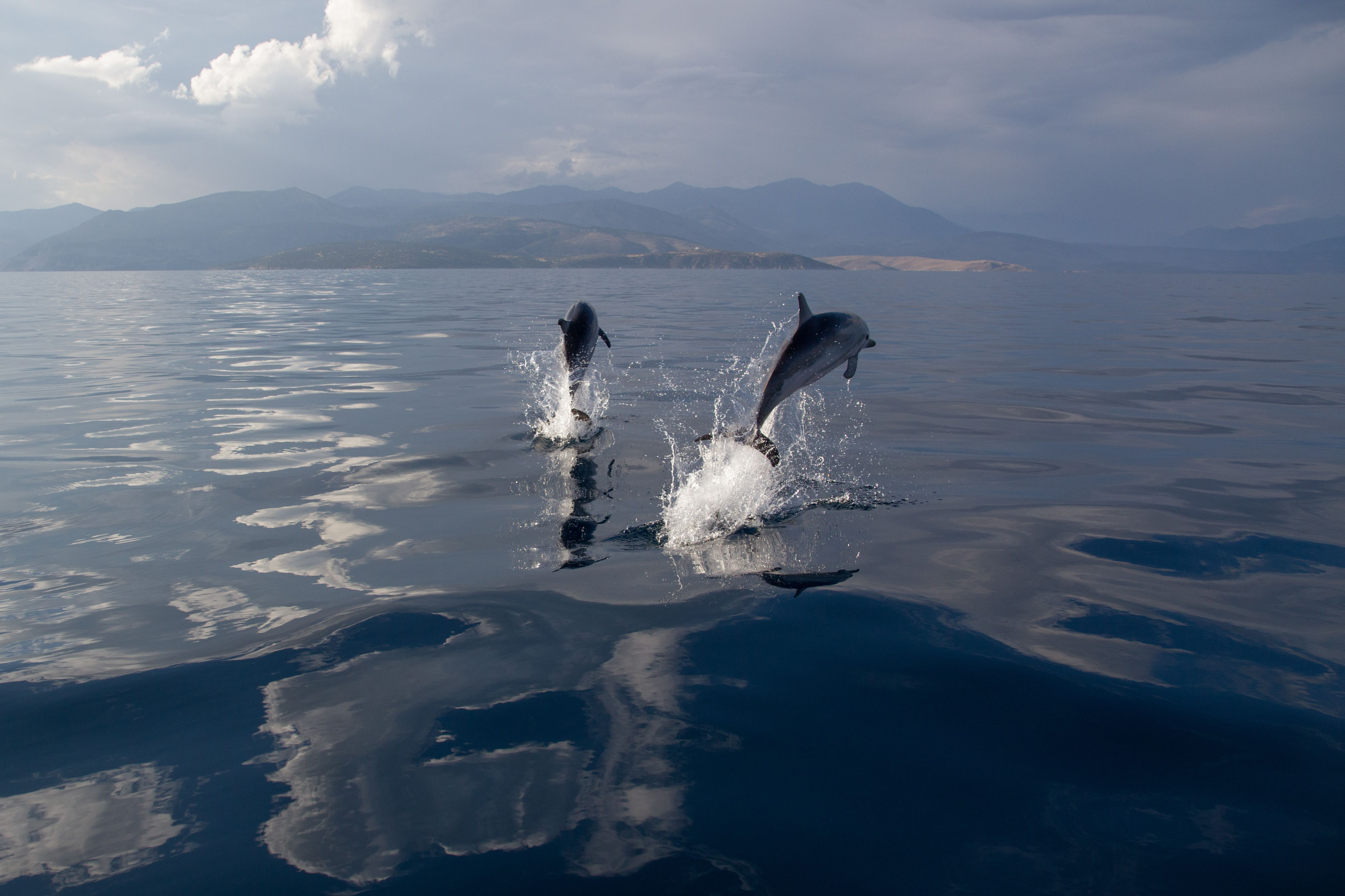

==== Short-beaked common dolphin (Delphinus delphis) ====
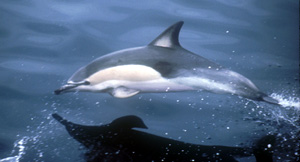
Short-beaked common dolphin (Delphinus delphis).

The short-beaked common dolphin (Delphinus delphis) is a small species, no more than 2 m long. It can be recognized by its hourglass lateral pattern, with a buffy-beige, almost yellow anterior zone and a bluish-gray posterior zone; the back is dark gray and the belly light. The rostrum is tapered, with a narrow melon, and the dorsal fin is high. It is found in medium-sized bands (ten to fifty individuals), both offshore and inshore. Its diet is varied and opportunistic, with a preference for small oily fish such as anchovies and sardines. It's a very sociable dolphin, enjoying the company of boats, especially sailboats.

Its distribution is very uneven: it is rare in the western basin (virtually absent from the French-Mediterranean coast),) and more common in the southern and eastern Mediterranean, particularly in Greece; it is particularly abundant in the Black Sea, where it replaces the Blue and White Dolphin (no doubt due to the relative absence of squid) and is sometimes considered a subspecies (Delphinus delphis ponticus).

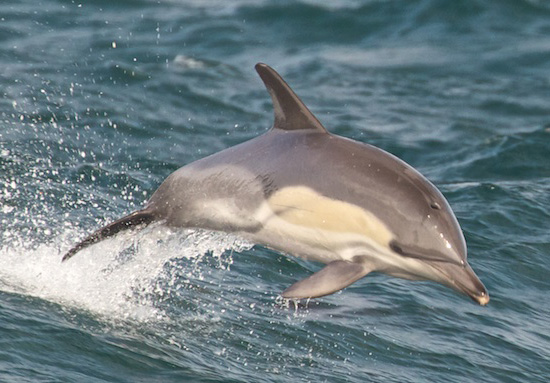

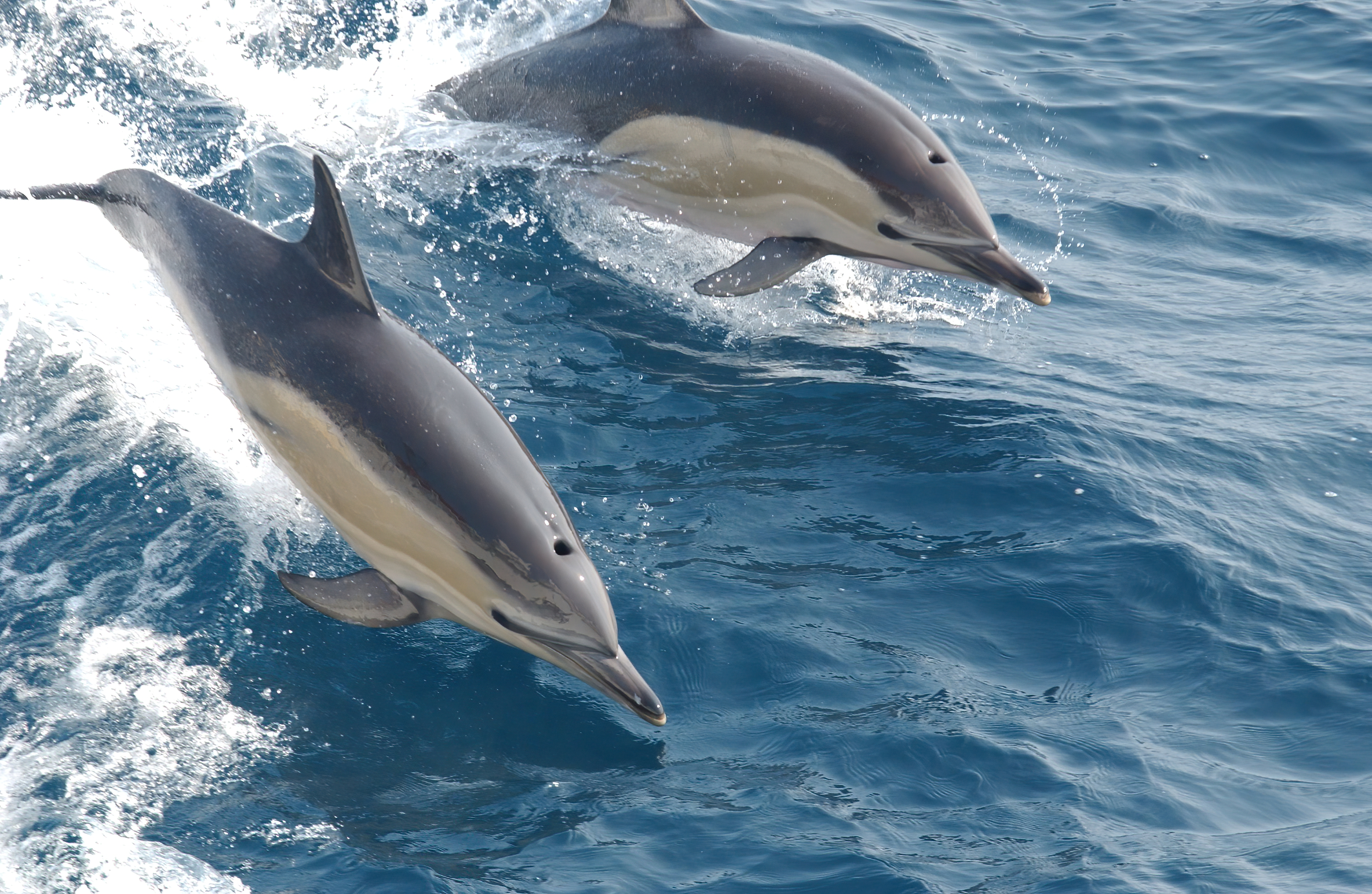

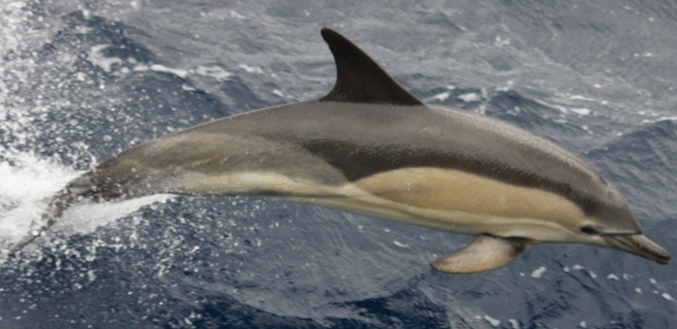

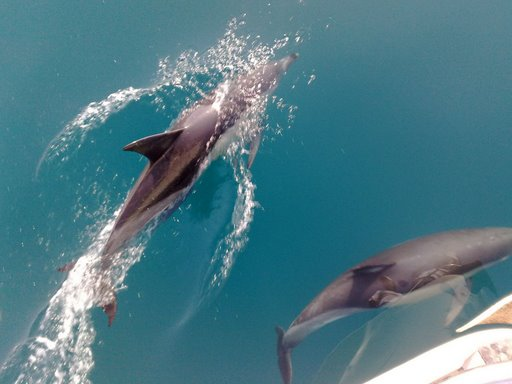

==== Bottlenose dolphin (Tursiops truncatus) ====
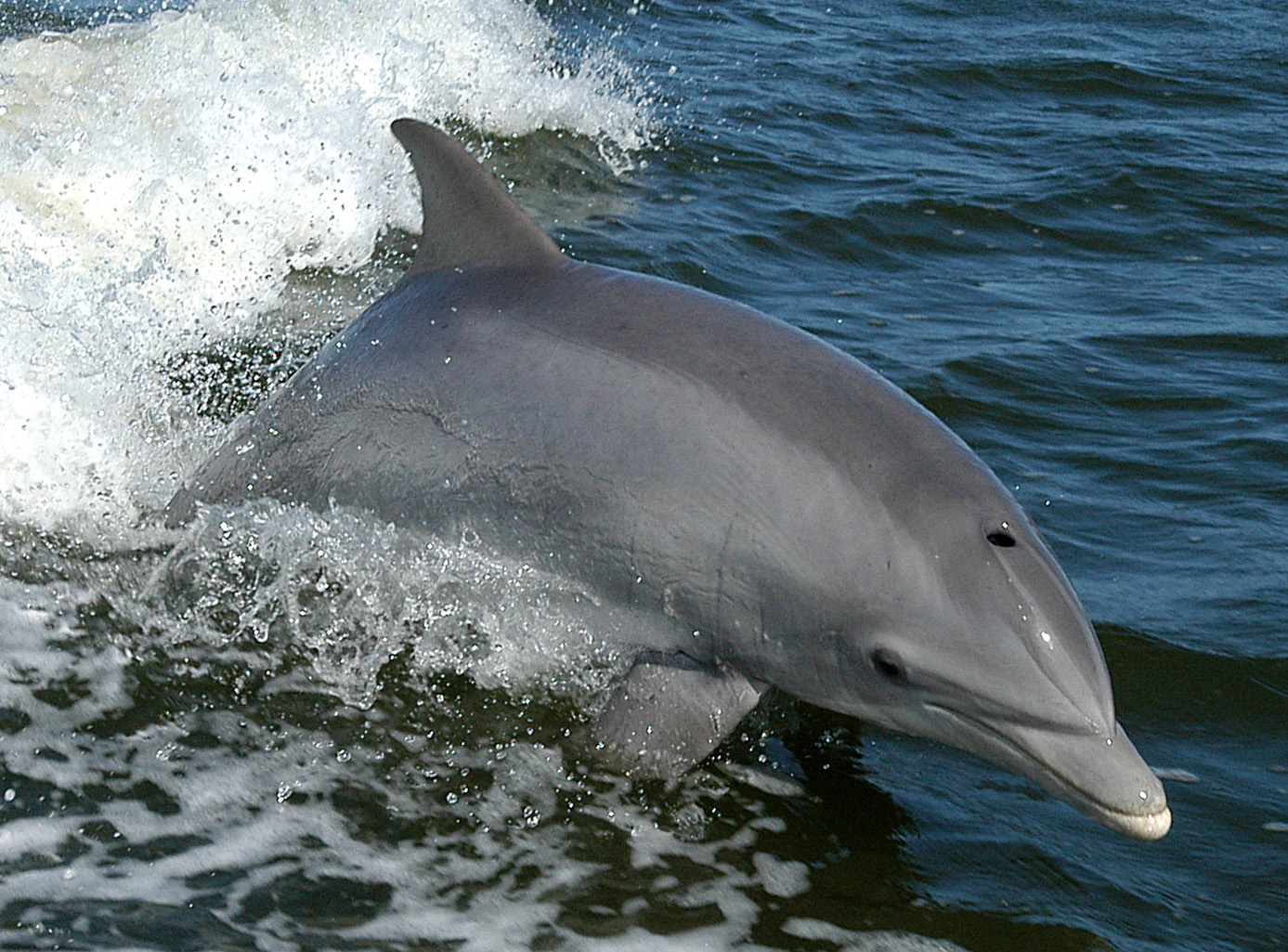
Grand Dauphin (Tursiops truncatus).

The Bottlenose dolphin, or Tursiops (Tursiops truncatus), is a massive species, reaching up to 4 m in length and weighing 500 kg, with an almost uniform gray color and a short rostrum. This makes it much more coastal than other species, which rarely venture more than 4 km from the shore, making it easier to observe.

It lives in small bands of five to twenty-five individuals, and feeds on fish, sometimes directly in nets. It is the cetacean with the greatest appetite for human interaction and the most commonly used dolphin in dolphinariums.

Although the Bottlenose dolphin is the most abundant cetacean species in the Mediterranean, its population is in a slight decline. It can be found along the coasts of the entire basin.

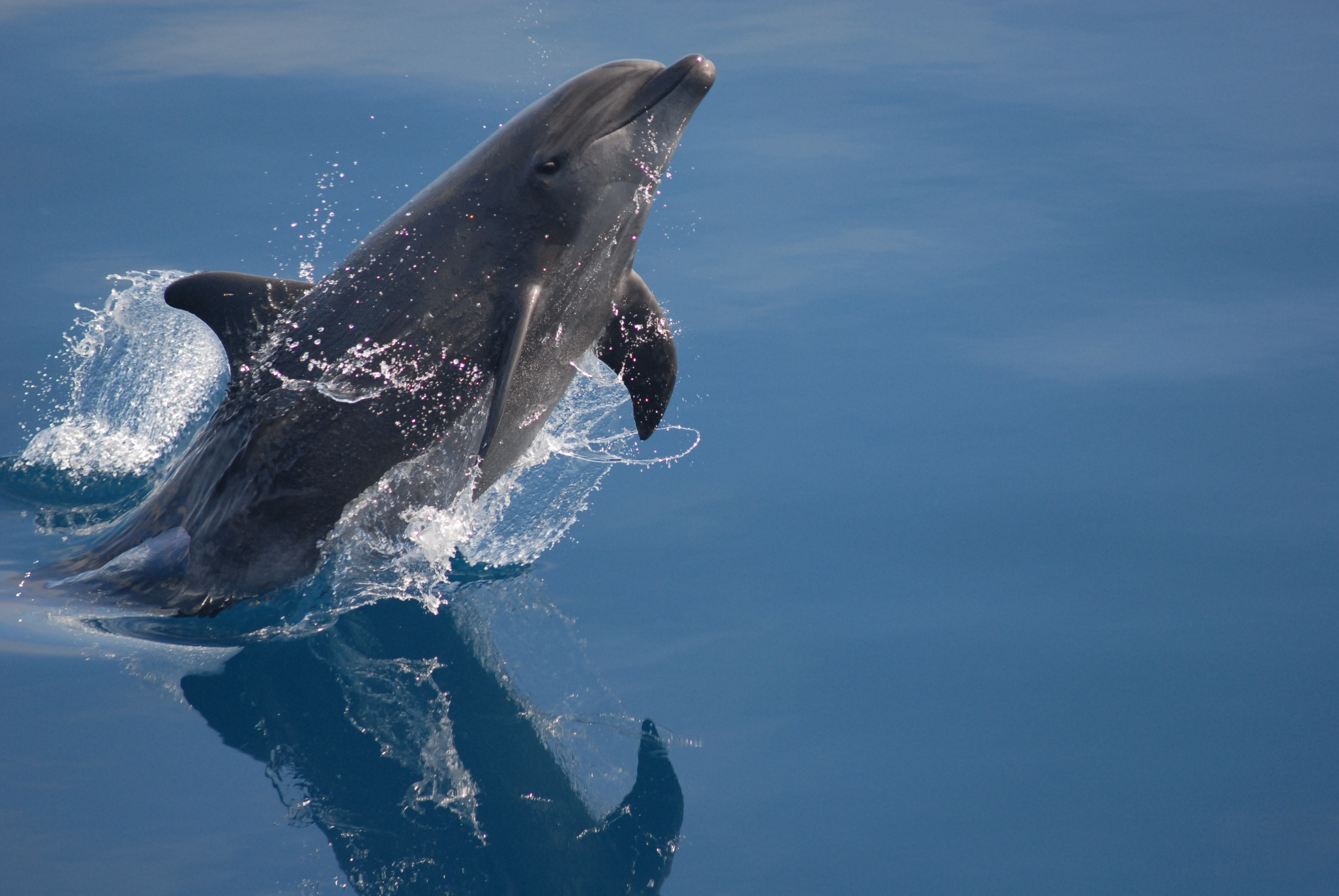

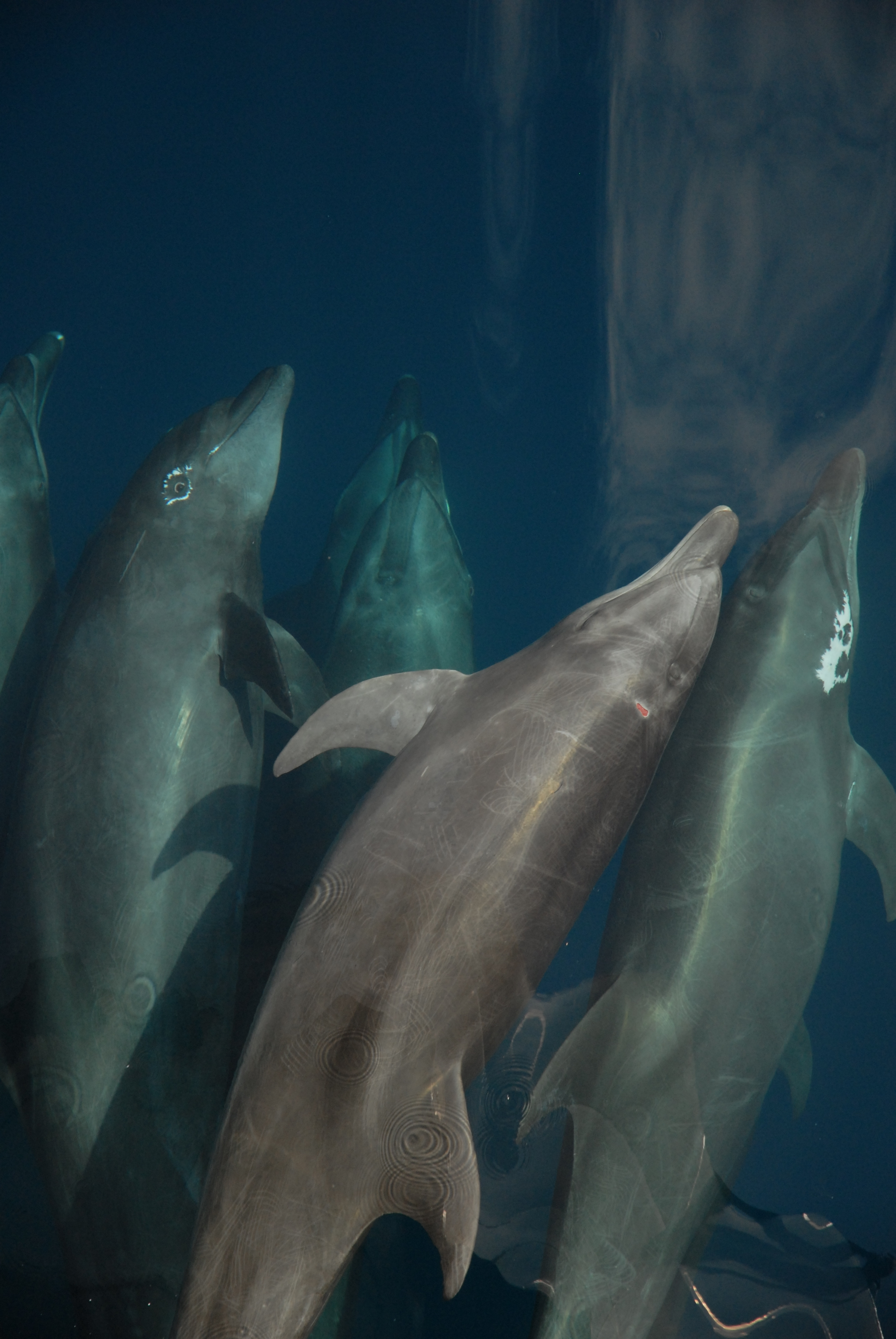

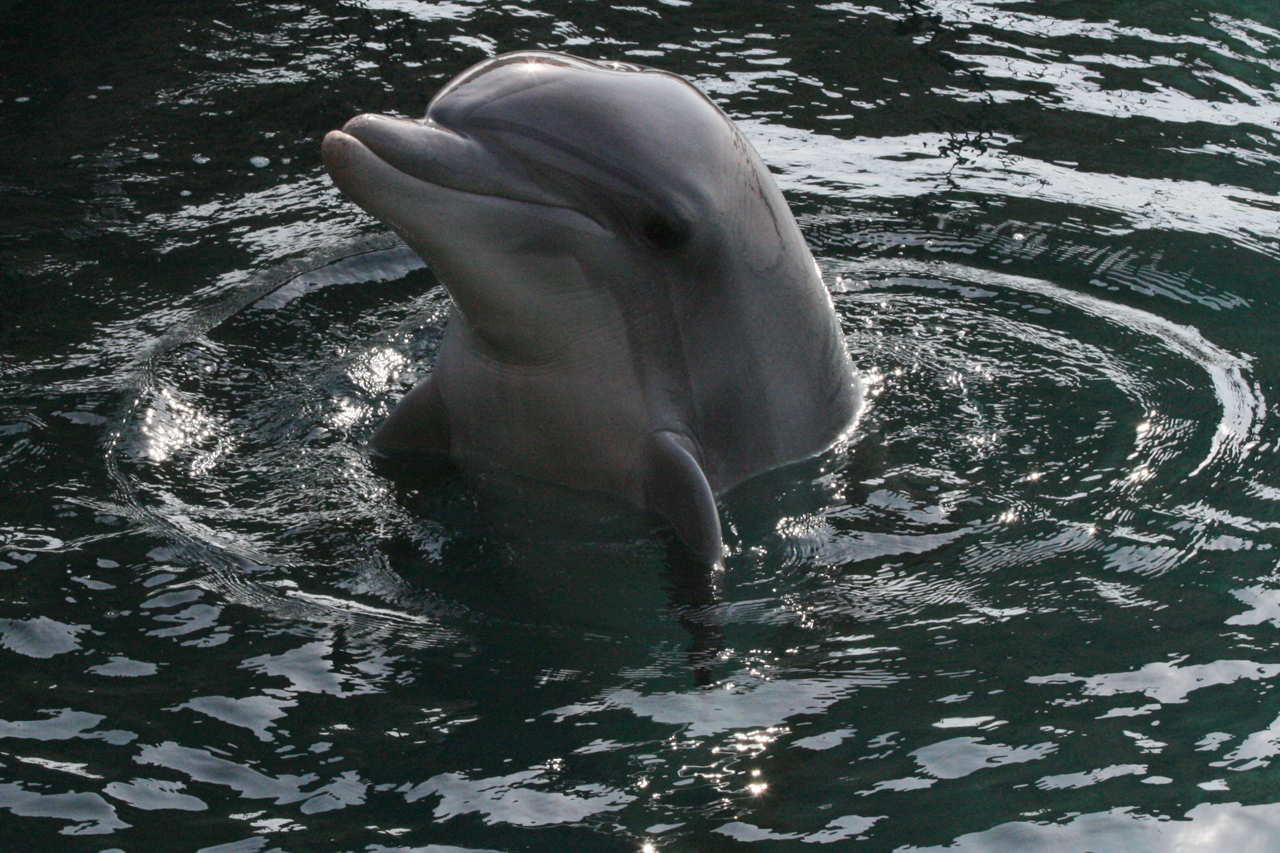

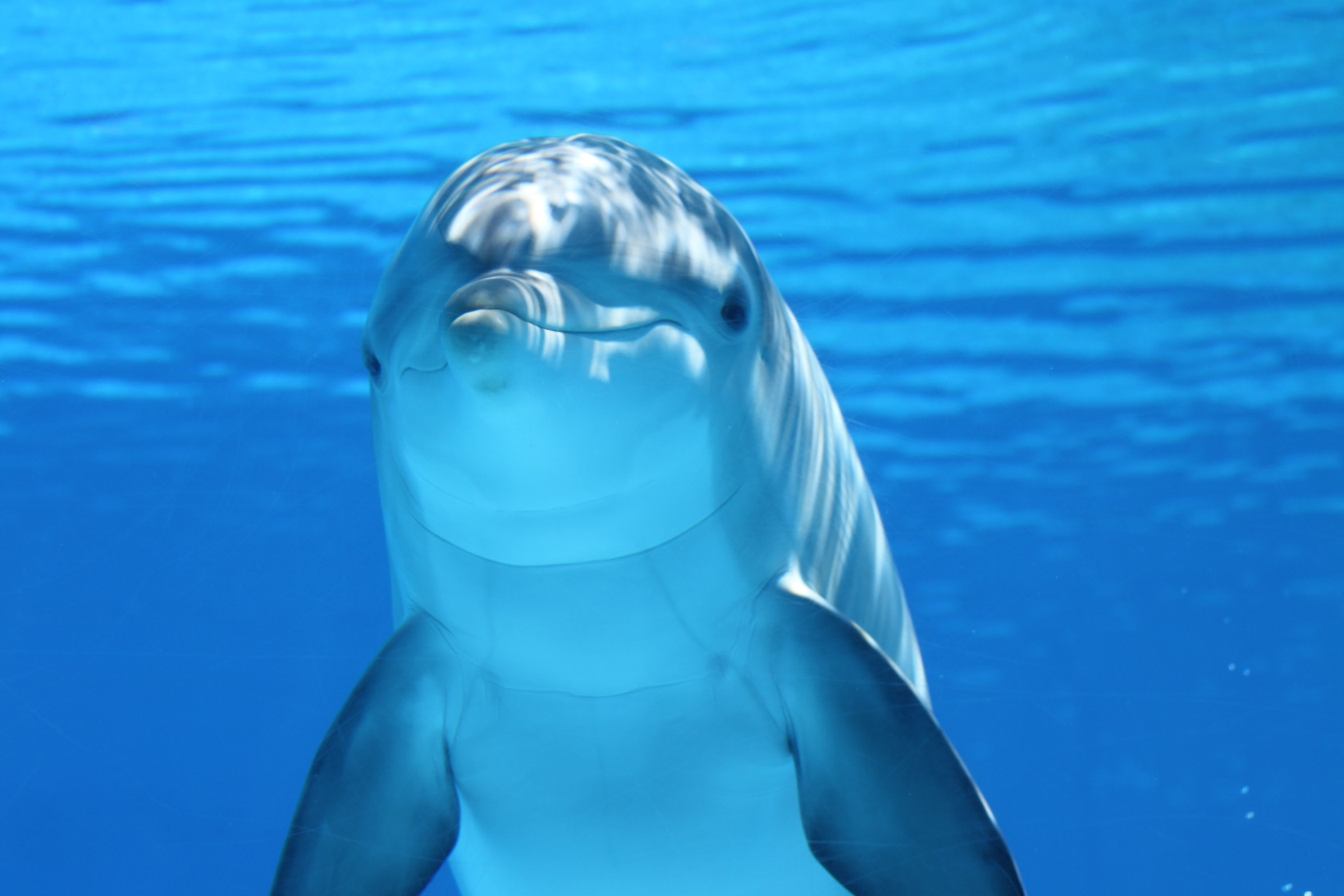

==== Risso's dolphin (Grampus griseus) ====
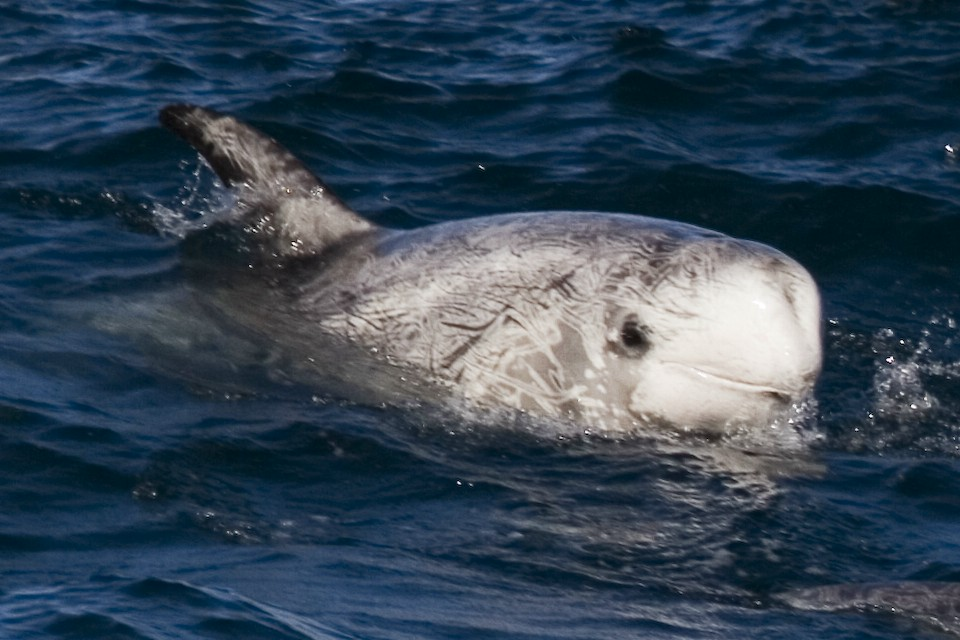
Risso's dolphin (Grampus griseus).

Risso's dolphin, or Grampus (Grampus griseus), is a large species, up to 4 m long and weighing 400 kg, characterized by a short beak, a rounded, angular head, a high dorsal fin (which can resemble that of an Orca) and, above all, a dark skin almost always streaked with long, light scars, which can turn older individuals completely white (the result of their many fights). Evolving in groups of a few dozen, they dive in search of squid. However, they tend to be found close to the coast, between twelve and twenty kilometers, sometimes less.

Their population in the north-western Mediterranean is estimated at between 3,000 and 5,000 individuals. They are mainly found in the northern half of the western Mediterranean and do not extend far beyond Greece, although they are occasionally reported as far south as Turkey.

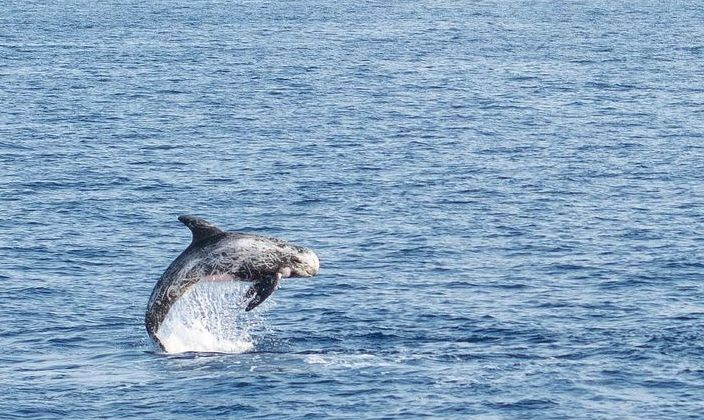

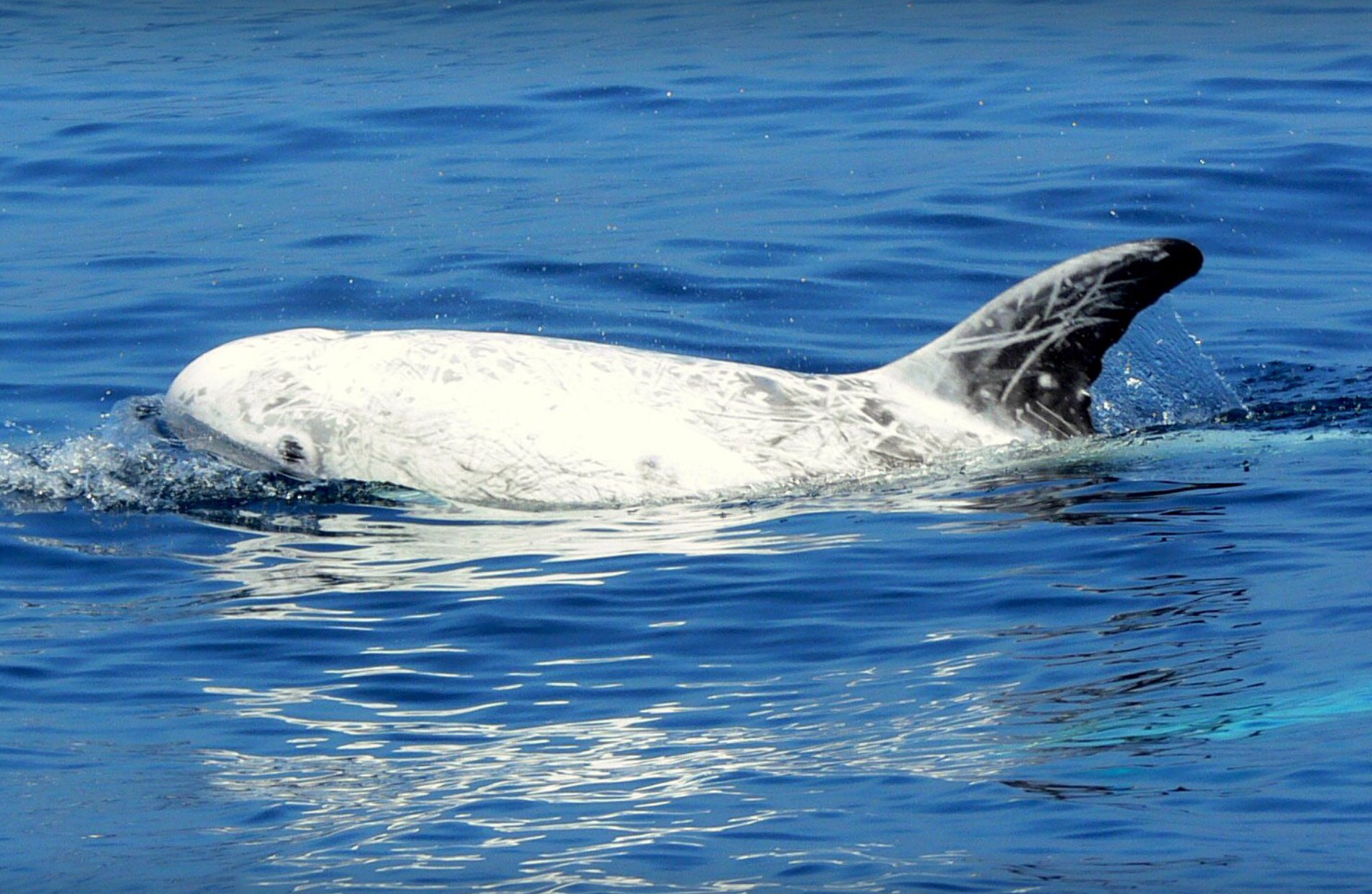

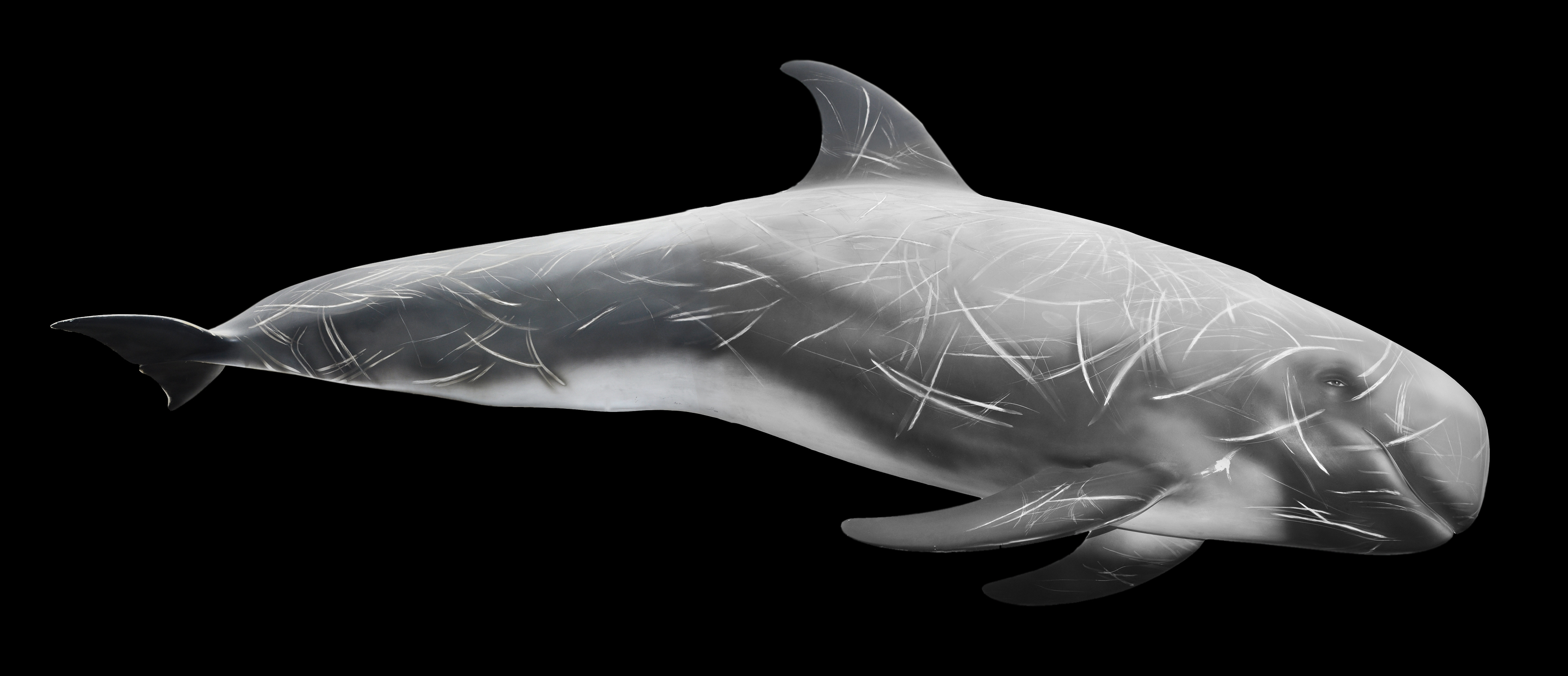

==== Long-finned pilot whale (Globicephala melas) ====
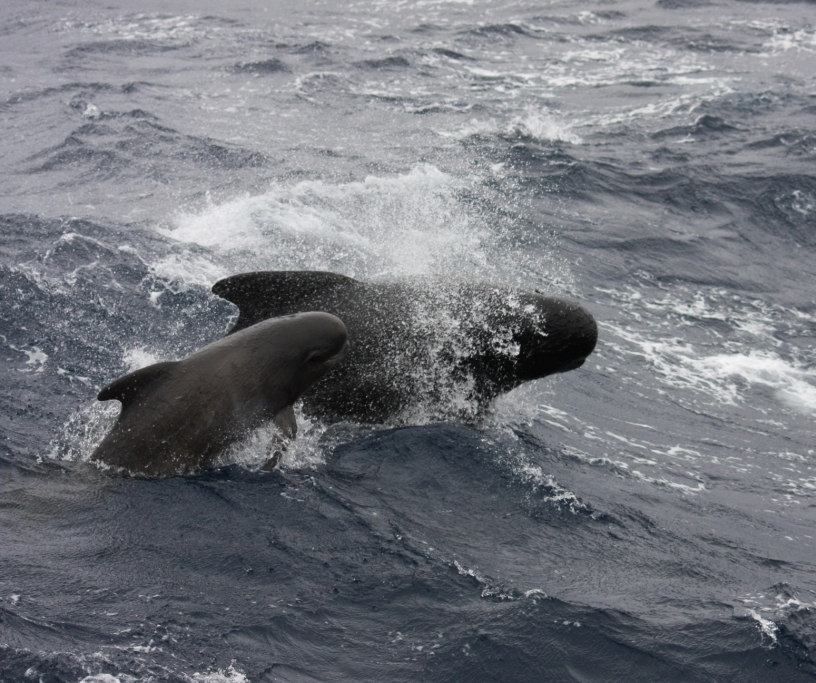
Long-finned pilot whale (Globicephala melas).

The long-finned pilot whale (Globicephala melas) is a very large dolphin, measuring five to six meters long and weighing one to three tons. It is an entirely black dolphin (apart from a white ventral plastron), with a round head, almost without a differentiated beak, and a short, backward-arched dorsal fin. It lives in groups of several dozen individuals, generally far offshore, where it dives to depth in search of squid.

This dolphin is found mainly in the Alboran Sea and the north-western Mediterranean where its population is estimated at between 3,000 and 5,000 individuals.

The other pilot whale species, the short-finned pilot whale (G. macrorhynchus), seems to have been seen at least once in the Mediterranean, probably as a stray group.

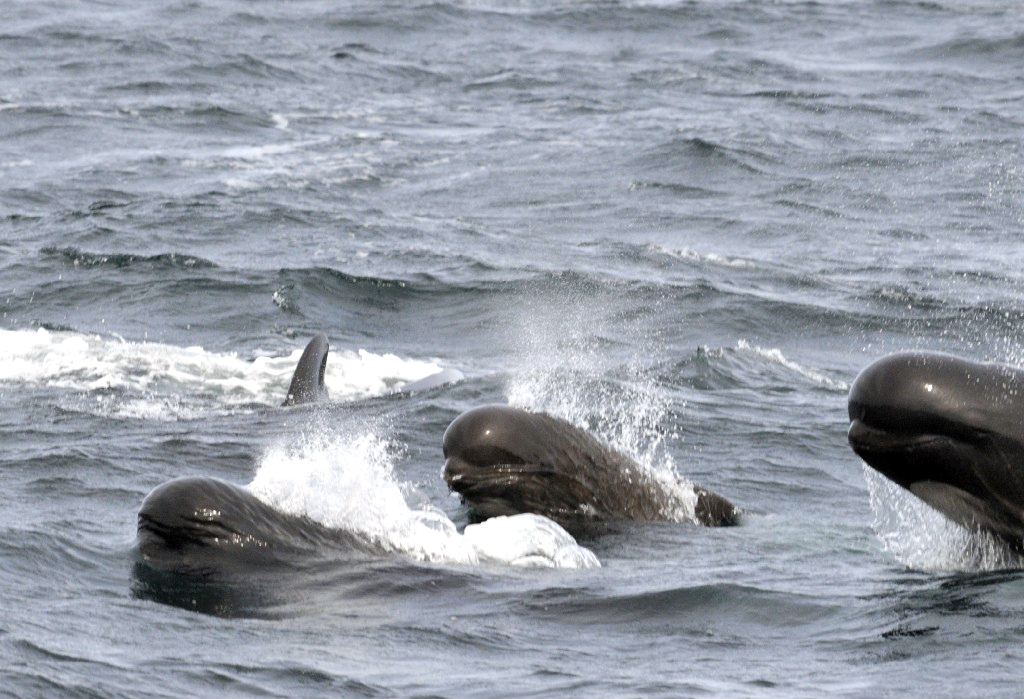

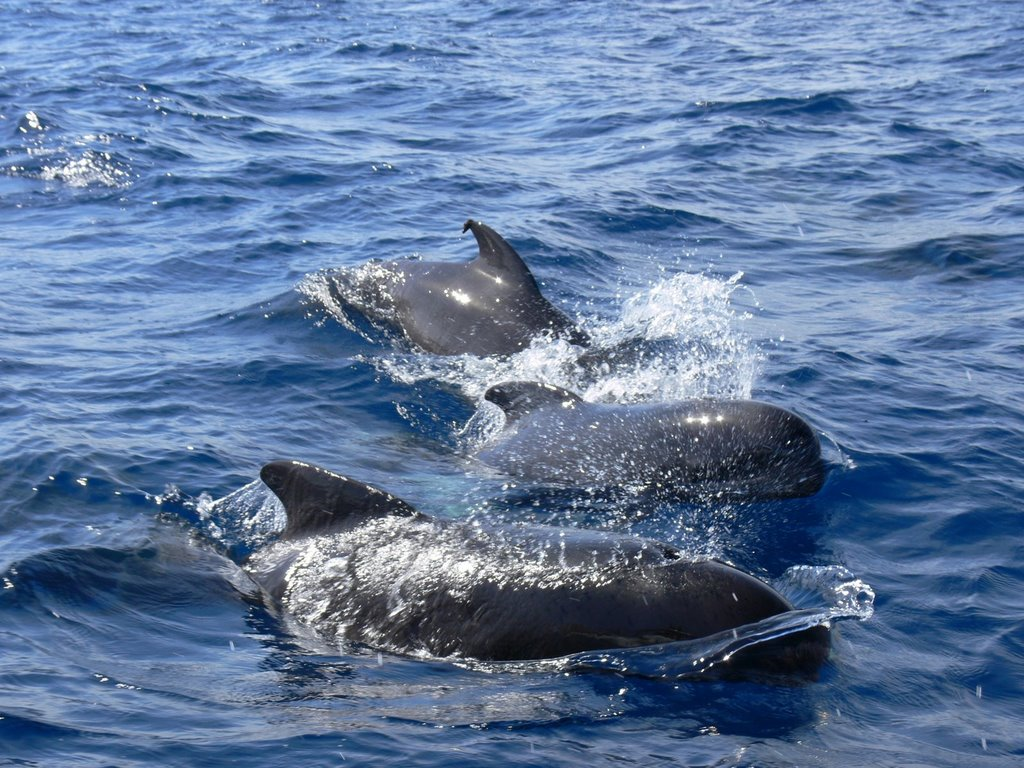

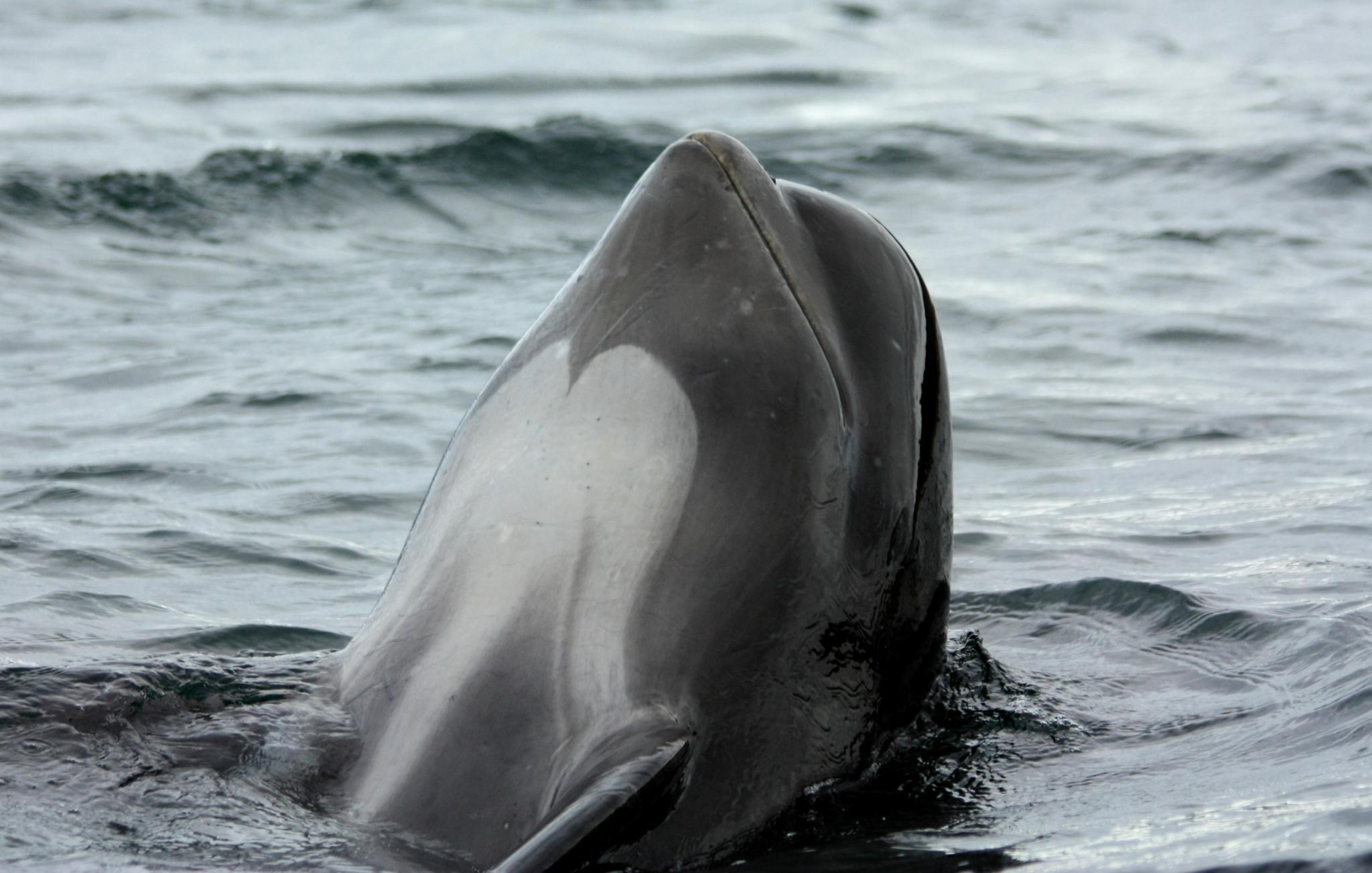

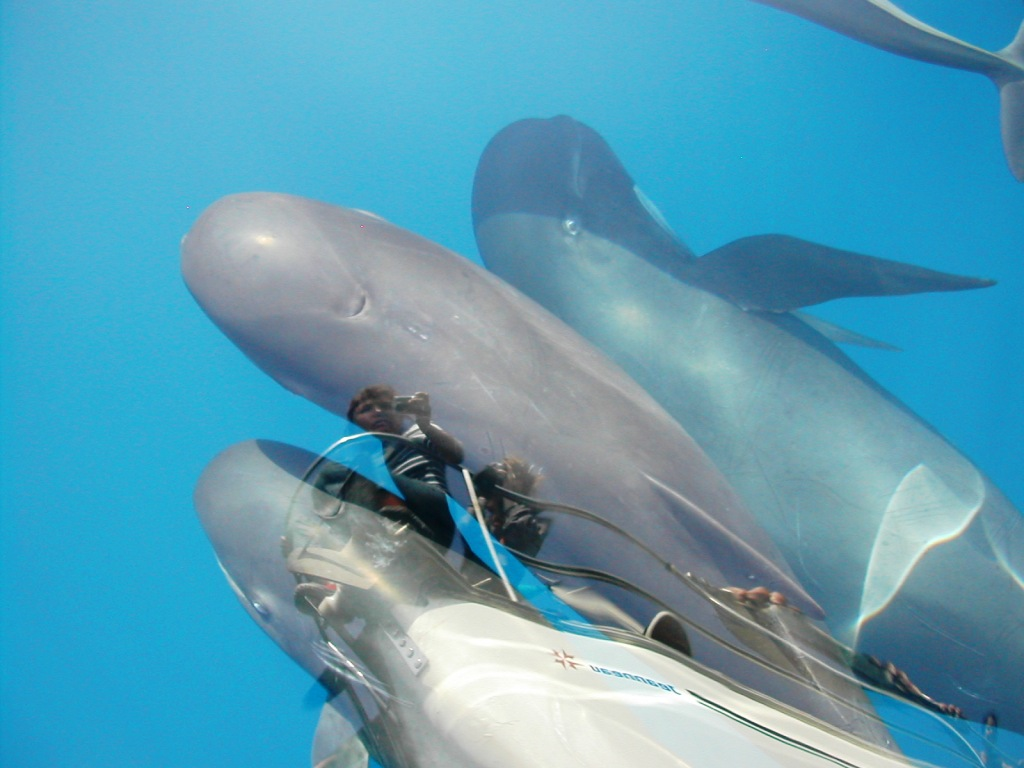

==== Orca (Orcinus orca) ====
Orcas (Orcinus orca).

The killer whale (Orcinus orca) is the largest delphinid species, easily recognized by its size, which can exceed 8 m in length and weigh nine tons, and its black and white coat.

This cosmopolitan species undertakes vast, more or less regular migrations. However, it remains very rare in the Mediterranean: the only roughly resident population is found around the Strait of Gibraltar and incursions as far as France are rare, although there is at least one record from Lebanon concerning Orcas who migrated from Iceland.

In 2019, the same Icelandic pod has been found off the coast of Genoa and near the strait of Messina, in Italy.https://www.corriere.it/animali/19_dicembre_17/orche-genova-arrivano-dall-islanda-hanno-nuotato-5mila-km-95f4ada6-20b5-11ea-ad99-8e4d121df86f.shtml

==== False killer whale (Pseudorca crassidens) ====
The False killer whale (Pseudorca crassidens) is the 3rd largest species in the delphinid family, with a length of up to six meters, a black coat and rounded head reminiscent of pilot whales, but a more elongated body, an almost melon-less head and a larger mouth. Its behavior is also more energetic. In the Mediterranean, this species seems to be represented only by a small population in the eastern basin, very rarely observed and about which little is known. A few isolated sightings do occur in the western basin, but it remains difficult to determine whether this is a resident population or temporary visitors from the Atlantic.

The false killer whale is classified as Near Threatened on the IUCN Red List.

==== Narrow-beaked dolphin (Steno bredanensis) ====
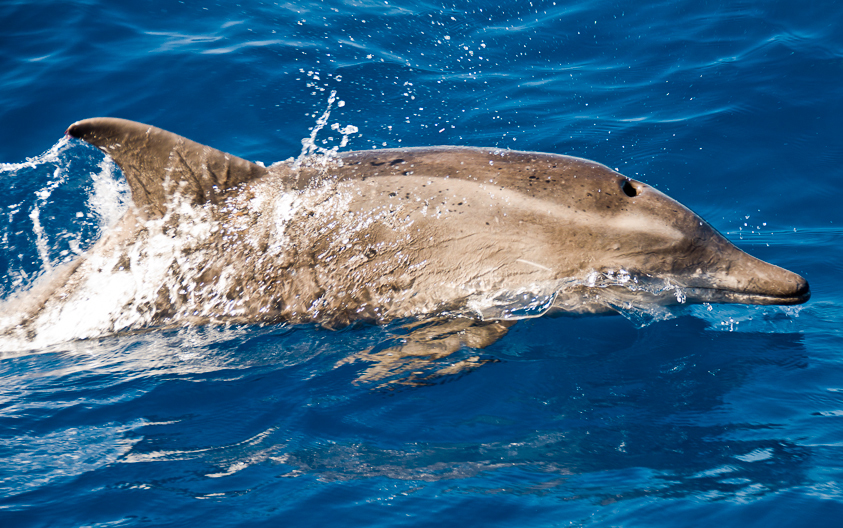
Bottlenose dolphin (Steno bredanensis).

The narrow-beaked dolphin, or Rough-toothed dolphin, (Steno bredanensis), a small gray species characterized by its straight forehead without a melon, is extremely rare in the Mediterranean. It is represented only by a small population in the eastern basin (and possibly another in the central Mediterranean), which is very rarely seen and about which little is known, but which may be increasing. There are, however, sporadic reports throughout the basin.

==== Atlantic spotted dolphin (Stenella frontalis) ====
The Atlantic spotted dolphin (Stenella frontalis), a small, rather tropical species with a dark coat spotted with light gray, has been reported in the Mediterranean but only exceptionally, and no resident population has been identified with any certainty. However, the ACCOBAMS considers these records to be doubtful.

==== Sperm whale (Physeter macrocephalus) ====
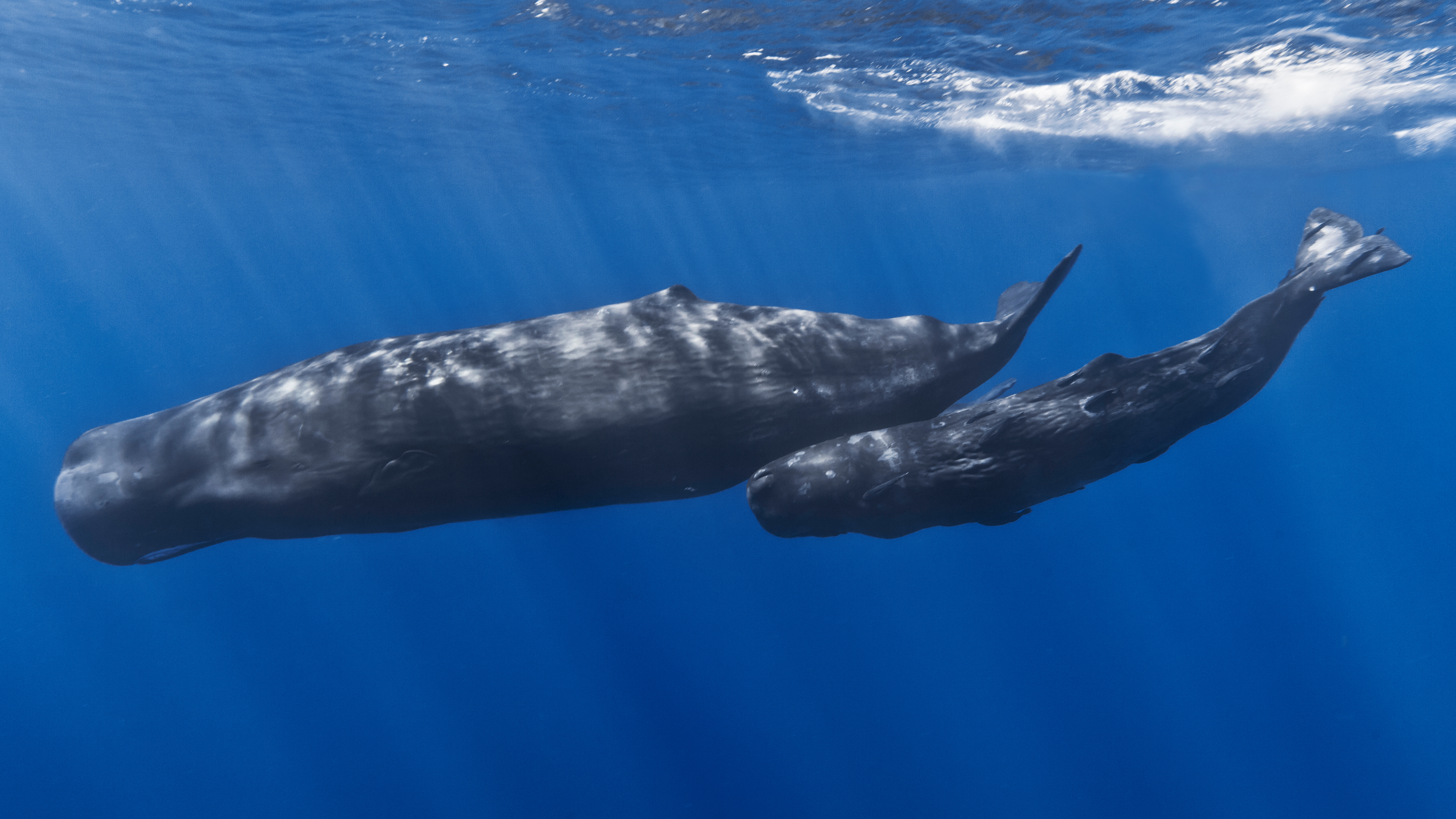
Grand Cachalot (Physeter macrocephalus), mom et juvenile.

The Great Sperm Whale (Physeter macrocephalus) is the largest of the odontocetes, measuring up to eighteen meters in length and weighing forty tons (considerably less for females). Recognizable by its size, angular silhouette and small pyramidal dorsal fin, it is the largest carnivorous predator of the 21st century, feeding on large abyssal squid, which it will fish at depths of up to 2,000 m after vertical probes, with its tail straight out of the water.

It can be found singly or in groups of two to twenty individuals (often less than five), generally offshore or above the continental slope.

The species has been recorded throughout the Mediterranean, excluding the Black Sea, and is rare in the Adriatic and Levantine Basin. The population is estimated at a thousand individuals in the western basin, and around 800 in the eastern Mediterranean.

The Great Sperm Whale is classified as "vulnerable" on the IUCN Red List.

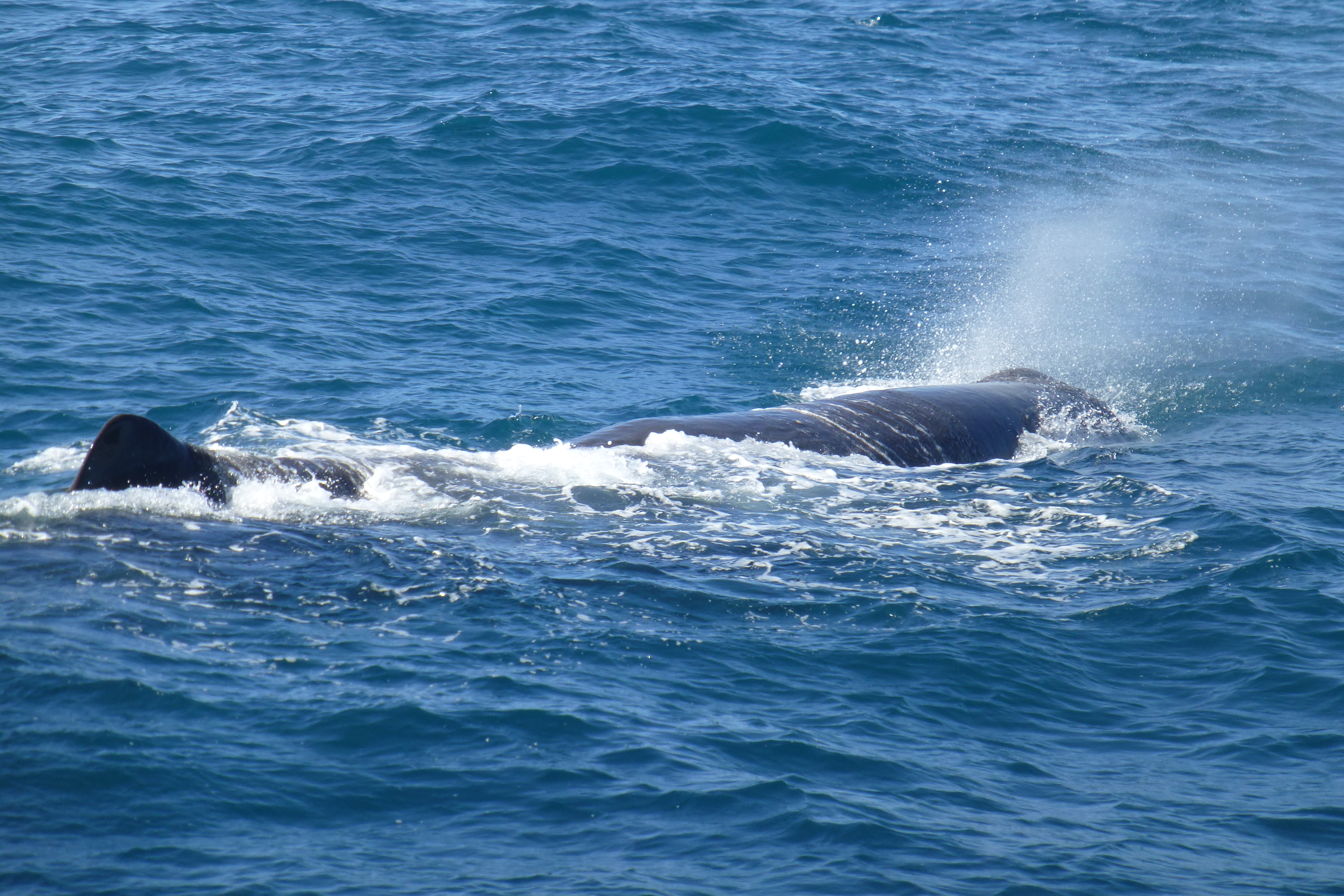

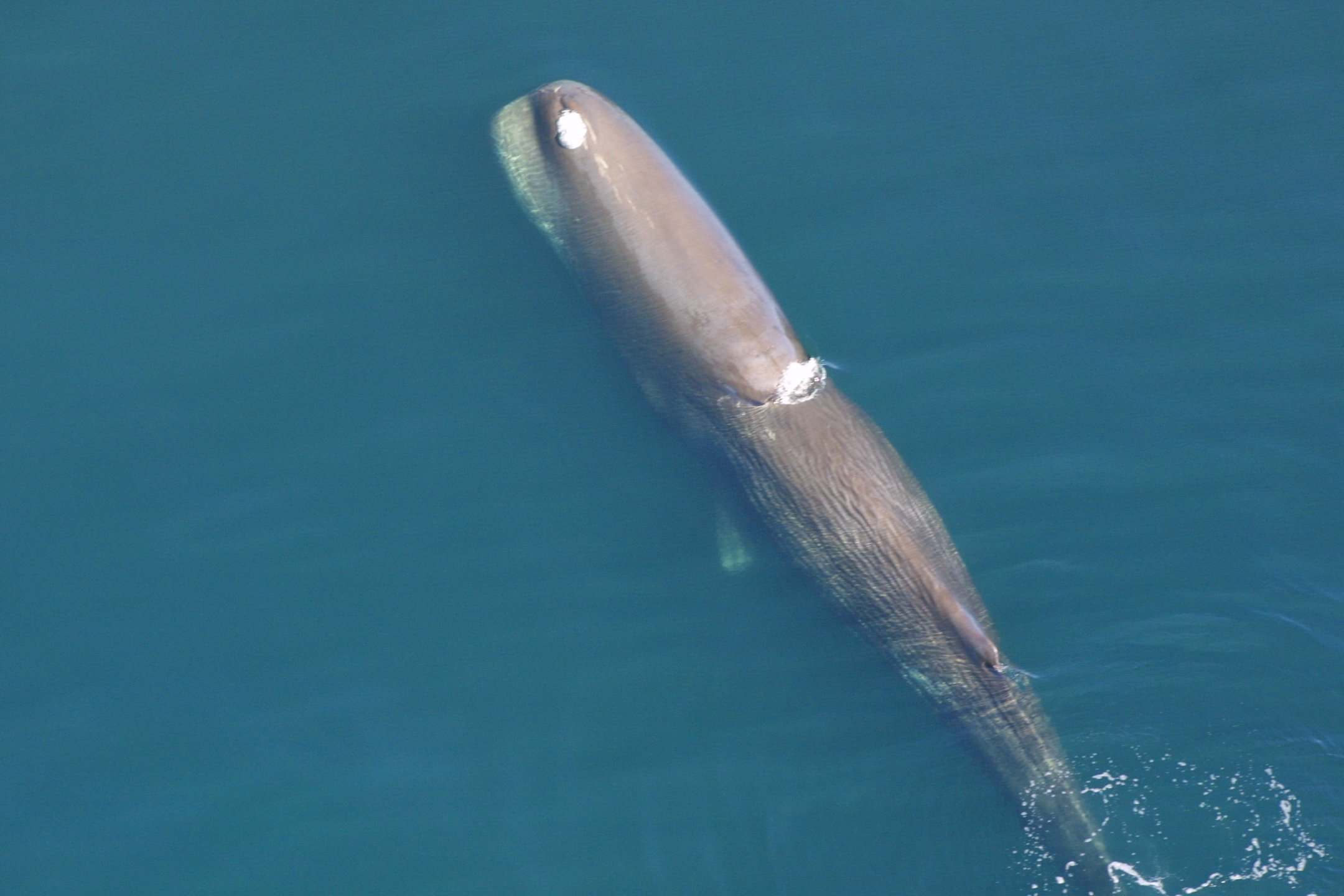

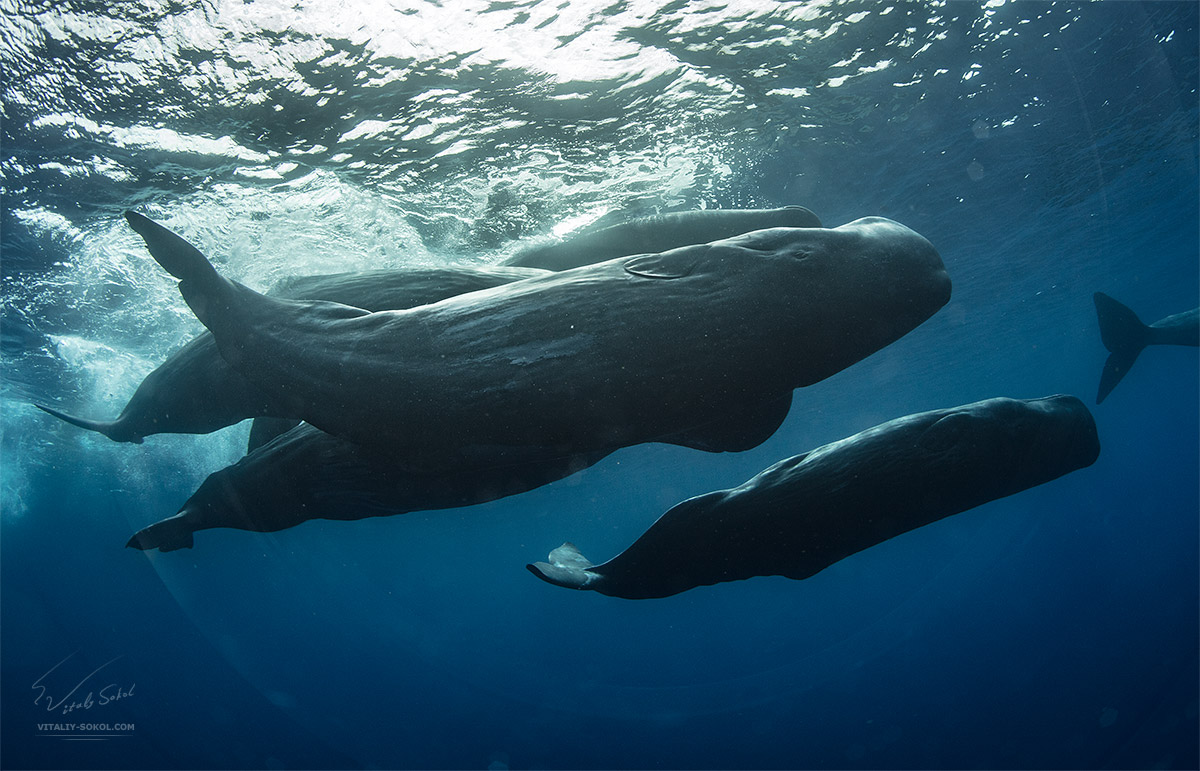

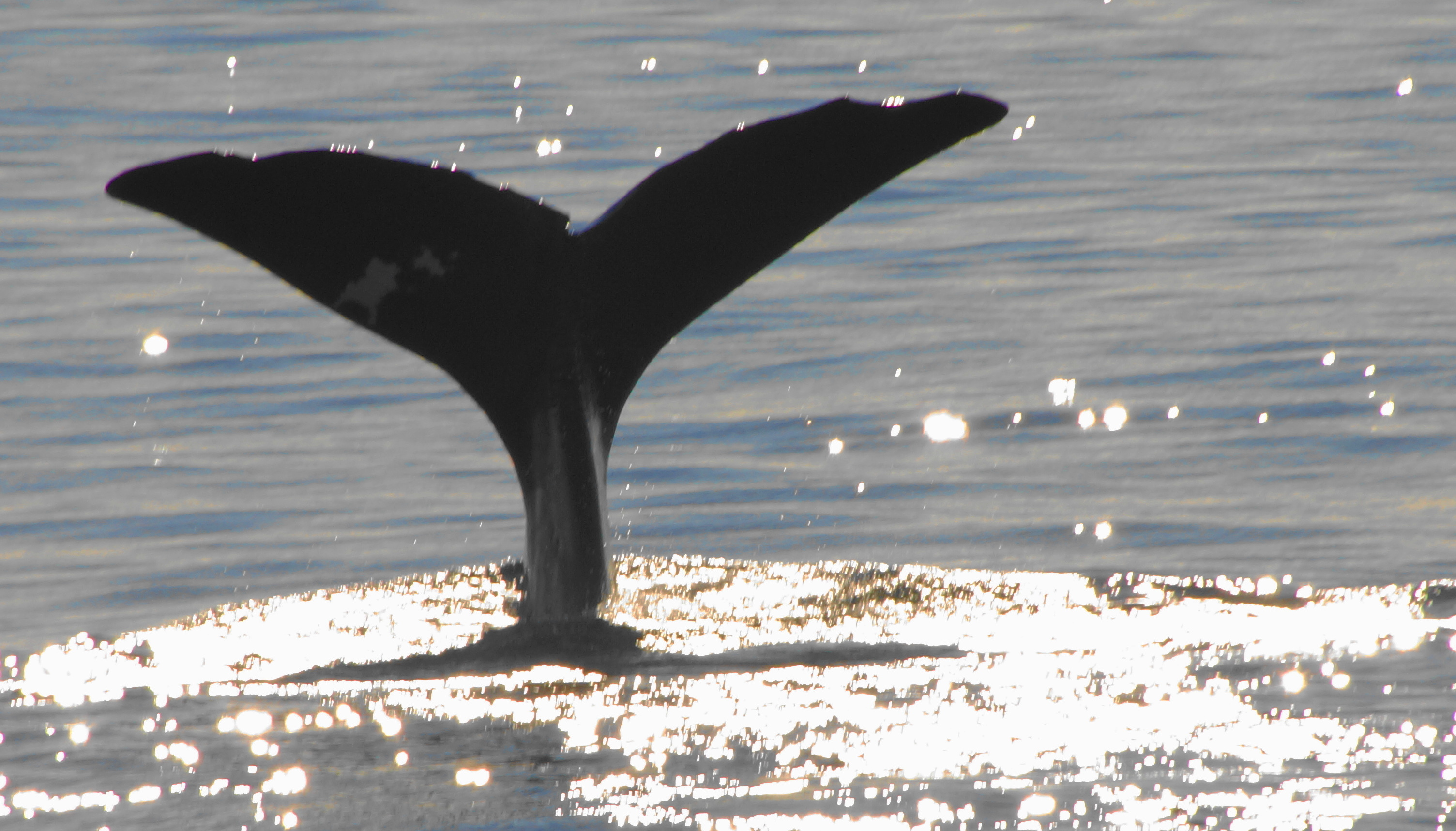

==== Dwarf sperm whale (Kogia sima) ====
The Dwarf sperm whale (Kogia sima), like its close relative the Pygmy Sperm Whale (K. breviceps), is a rather small species (2.7 m maximum) with a chubby, discreet appearance and a mainly tropical distribution.

It has been reported in the Mediterranean (mainly on the basis of four stranded specimens in Morocco and Italy),) but is considered extremely rare.

==== Cuvier's beaked whale (Ziphius cavirostris) ====
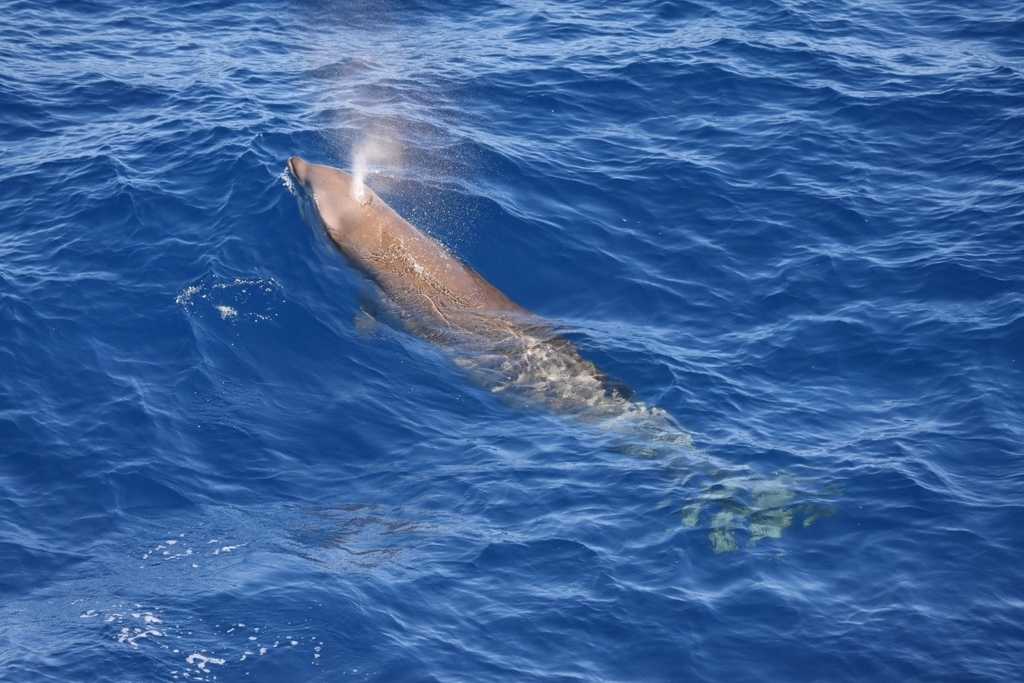
Cuvier's beaked whale (Ziphius cavirostris).

The Cuvier's beaked whale, or Ziphius (Ziphius cavirostris), is a large species of beaked whale, measuring up to seven meters long and weighing seven tons, with a pointed, rather short beak (especially compared to mesoplodons), from which two prominent teeth protrude in males. This species can be found alone or in small groups (two to four individuals), on the continental slope or even further offshore, in most of the Mediterranean basin. It is the most widespread ziphiid worldwide, and the only one to occur in the Mediterranean.

It is the deepest and longest-diving mammal, with a record depth of 2,992 m and an apnea time of 3 h 42.

This species therefore appreciates deep waters, and is therefore rarer in shallow areas such as the Adriatic, and absent from the Black Sea. The largest populations seem to be found in the Alboran Sea, the Ligurian Sea, east of Sardinia, along the underwater trenches of southern Greece and off the Middle East.

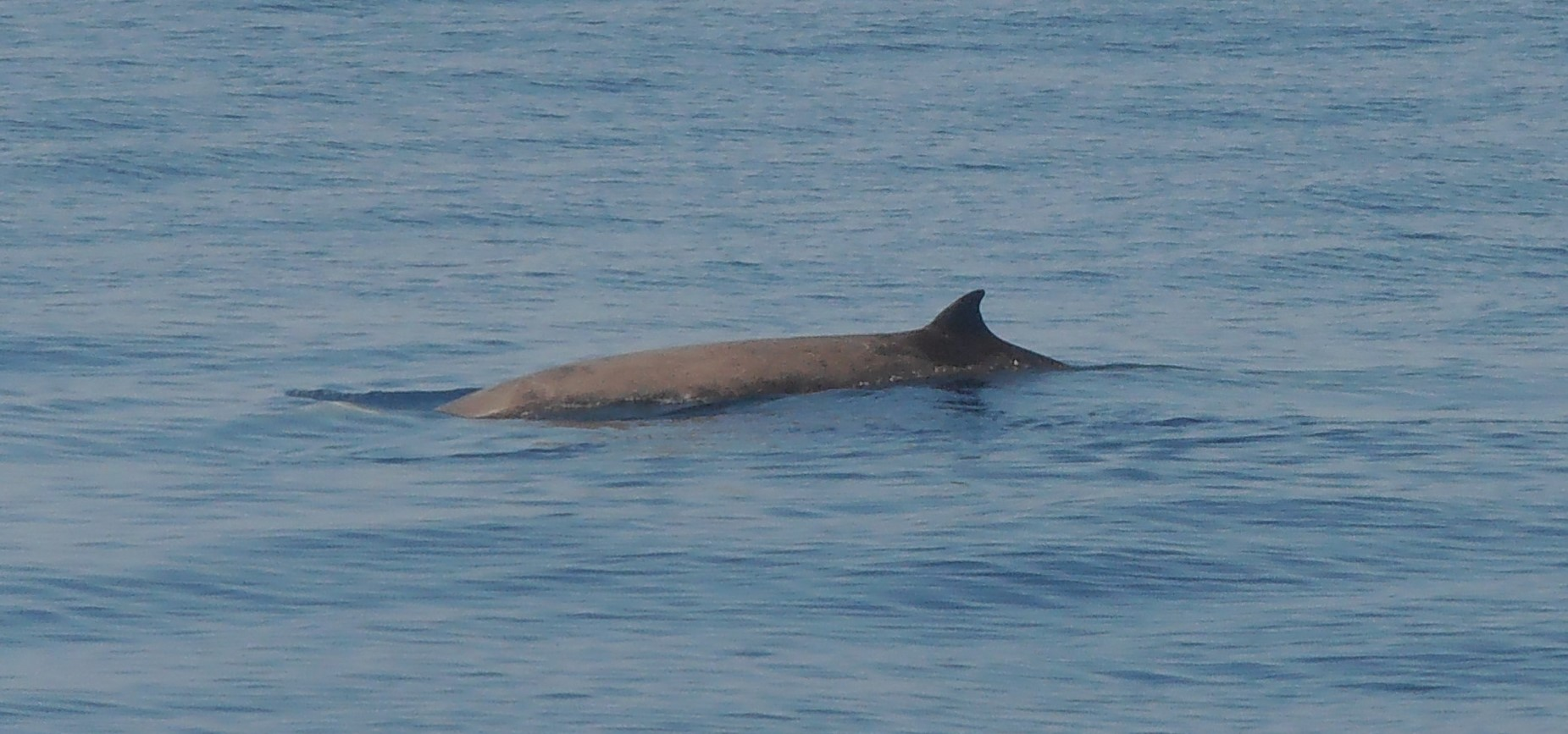

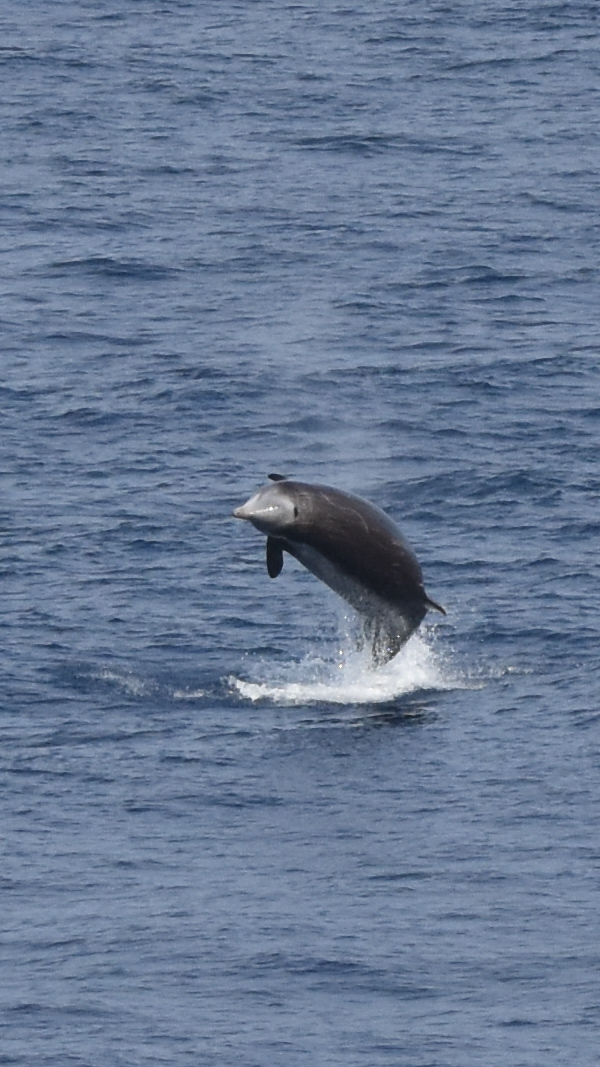

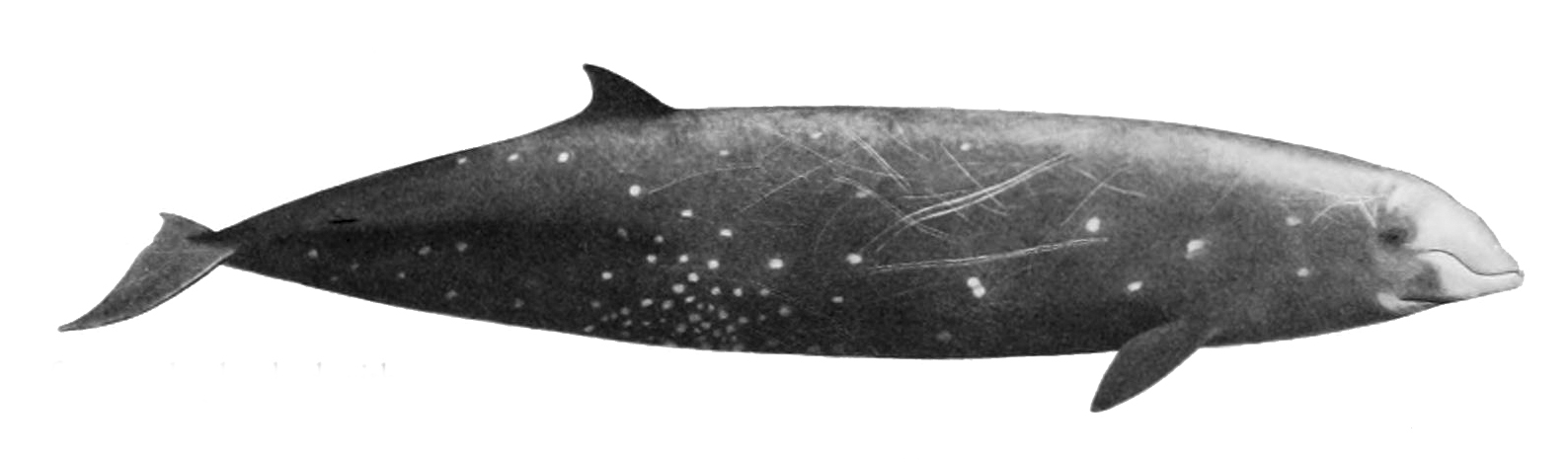

==== Blainville's mesoplodon (Mesoplodon densirostris) ====
Blainville's Mesoplodon (Mesoplodon densirostris) is a beaked whale that is smaller (4–6 m) than the previous species, with a longer beak and deformed tusks in both sexes. This species has been recorded in the Mediterranean, but its presence is very rare, even uncertain.

==== Sowerby's Mesoplodon (Mesoplodon bidens) ====
Sowerby's Mesoplodon (Mesoplodon bidens) is a beaked whale that is smaller (4–6 m) than Cuvier's Whale, with a longer, tapered beak. Unlike the Cuvier Whale, this species does not appear to be spotted, and the male's teeth are clearly visible but do not form prominences. This species has been recorded in the Mediterranean, but its presence is rare or uncertain.

==== Harbour porpoise (Phocoena phocoena) ====
The harbor porpoise (Phocoena phocoena), once abundant in the Mediterranean, almost completely disappeared in the 19th and 20th centuries. However, a population still exists in the Black Sea (considered a subspecies: Phocoena phocoena relicta Abel, 1905) and individuals can be found in the Aegean Sea (Greece and Turkey), in the northern part of the eastern basin.

=== Old, unique, artificial or yet-to-be-confirmed records ===
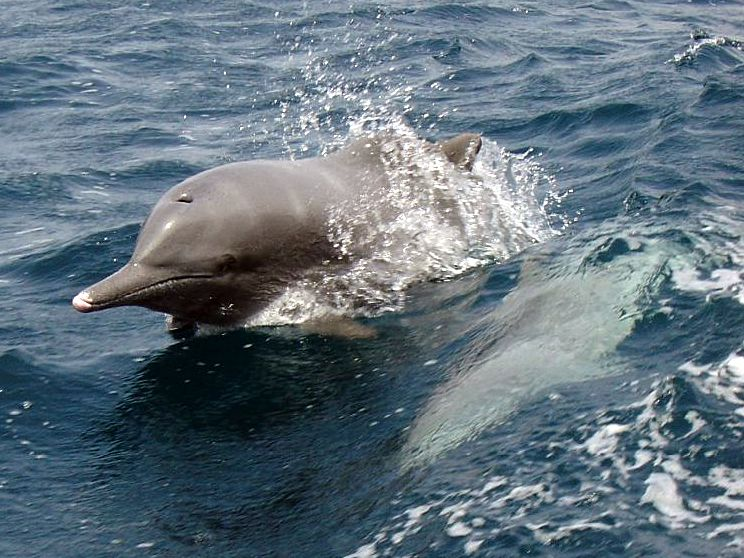
The Indian Ocean humpback dolphin (Sousa plumbea) could soon be part of the Mediterranean fauna, thanks to the Suez Canal.

A few other species have sometimes been the subject of very isolated records, such as the North Atlantic right whale (Eubalaena glacialis, two records dating from the nineteenth century), the northern daylily (Hyperoodon ampullatus, two specimens stranded in Languedoc in 1880 and only one credible visual sighting since, in the Alboran Sea) and Gervais' Mesoplodon (Mesoplodon europaeus, one specimen stranded in Italy in 2001).

In addition, the Indian Ocean humpback dolphin (Sousa plumbea) has been the subject of several recent reports in Egypt and Israel, as it appears to have successfully crossed the Suez Canal ("Lessepsian migration"). It is unclear whether a stable population will result, but it appears to be expanding. Similarly, a pair of Belugas (Delphinapterus leucas), an Arctic species, were mistakenly released in the Crimea in 1991, but the chances of this resulting in a resident population are very slim.

Other records are now considered erroneous: Bryde's whale (Balaenoptera edeni), True's mesoplodon (Mesoplodon mirus), Narwhal (Monodon monoceros), pygmy killer whale (Feresa attenuata), white-sided leach (Leucopleurus acutus) and white-billed leach (Lagenorhynchus albirostris). The presence of certain mesoplodons remains debated.

=== Other large marine vertebrates ===
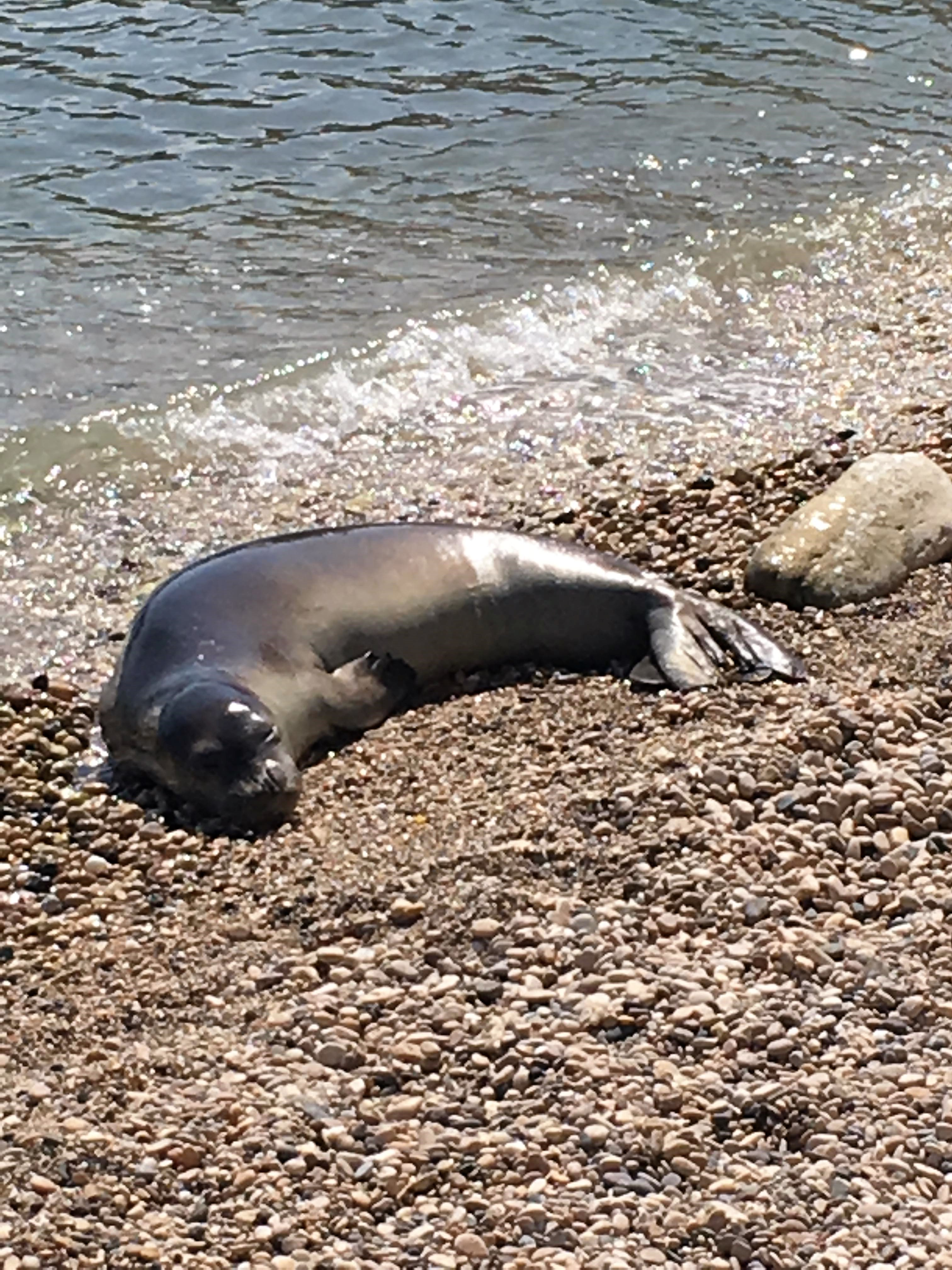
The Mediterranean monk seal is a marine mammal, but not a cetacean: it's a pinniped.

The Mediterranean is home to several other large marine species that are sometimes associated with cetaceans in the collective imagination, notably through the myths and legends of sea monsters. Although they belong to other vertebrate groups unrelated to cetaceans, some of these animals may occupy similar ecological niches, and are often subject to the same threats to their habitats and way of life.

The Mediterranean monk seal (Monachus monachus) is the only species of marine mammal in the Mediterranean not belonging to the cetacean family: it belongs to the pinniped group, carnivores that have retained four independent limbs and are therefore able to emerge from the water to rest or breed on beaches. Once abundant throughout the basin, it has been in danger of extinction since the 20th century, with only a few hundred individuals remaining, mainly in Greece and Turkey. The Greek region of Phocis and the various "Phocaean cities" owe their names to this species.

Two species of sea turtle (which are reptiles) also nest in the Mediterranean and are the subject of conservation measures, often in conjunction with cetaceans: the Loggerhead turtle (Caretta caretta), distributed throughout the basin, and the Green turtle (Chelonia mydas), mainly in the south and east.

Finally, a number of large fish are also subject to protection measures similar to those for cetaceans, such as the Basking shark (Cetorhinus maximus), the Mediterranean Sea Devil (Mobula mobular), or, closer to the coast, the Brown Grouper (Epinephelus marginatus).

== Threats ==
Cetaceans are long-lived animals (particularly whales), with a theoretically low mortality rate once they reach adulthood and virtually no predation, even if they remain exposed to diseases and parasites (which are thought to be involved in 25% of cetacean deaths in the Mediterranean, particularly when their proliferation becomes pathological in old, weak or immunocompromised animals). Consequently, any additional mortality factor has an even greater impact on populations, whose renewal is very slow.

=== Fishing ===
Since 1982, the International Whaling Commission (IWC) has prohibited whaling, except in a few special cases justified by science or tradition, for which it grants hunting permits: no such permits exist in the Mediterranean, no other cetaceans are authorized for fishing, and there appears to be no cetacean poaching in this sea.

However, cetaceans are often indirect victims of fishing, in at least two ways.

- The first is the phenomenon of "bycatch", whereby small cetaceans (particularly dolphins) can become trapped in nets, where they have been attracted by the high concentration of fish and end up drowning. This type of mortality is still poorly documented in the Mediterranean, but is well known in the Bay of Biscay, where thousands of common dolphins are killed every year. According to the WWF, 300,000 cetaceans die every year worldwide as a result of fishing nets, and even more turtles and other endangered marine animals: around a third of the 94 million tonnes of animals killed by fishing are thought to be by-catch. Researchers estimate that between 80 and 250 Blue and White Dolphins were accidentally captured in fishing nets every summer between 2000 and 2005.
- The second is the problem of "ghost nets", i.e. the many abandoned fishing nets drifting with the currents, which retain their lethal properties for several years, even decades. In particular, they trap cetaceans and sea turtles, which drown because they can't come to the surface to breathe.

=== Collisions ===
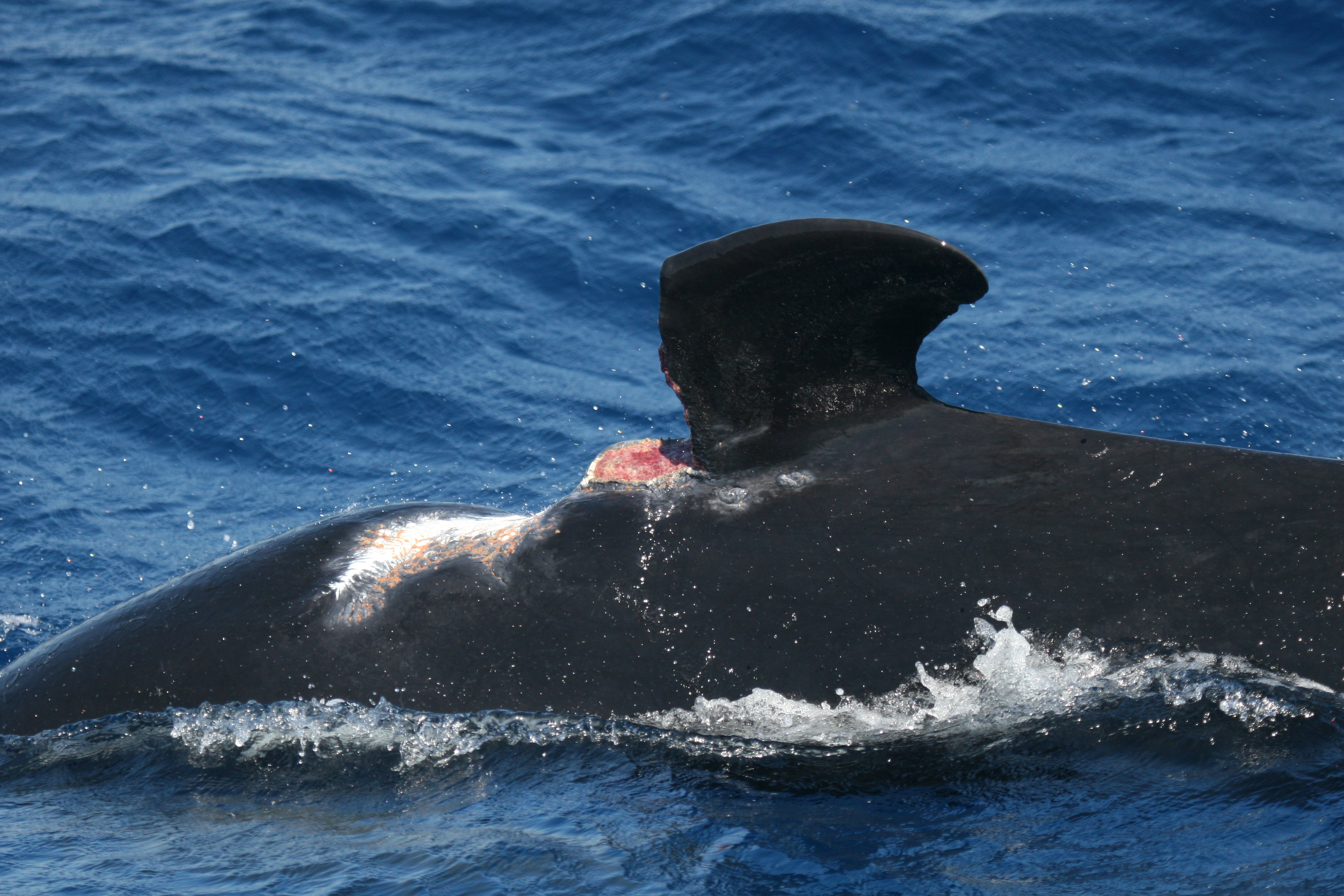
This pilot whale was crippled by a ship's propeller.

A quarter of the world's maritime traffic passes through the Mediterranean, along extremely dense routes where ships – like marine species – are regularly concentrated by narrow straits (the Dardanelles, the Otranto Channel, the Strait of Messina, the Corsica Channel, the Sicily Channel, the Mouths of Bonifacio, the Corinth Channel and, of course, the Strait of Gibraltar). Along these maritime highways, the risk of collisions between cetaceans and unmaneuverable vessels such as container ships, ferries, liners and superyachts is enormous. Traffic is estimated at 9,000 ships a day, a figure that could double by 2050. A study based on actual ship traffic and the average distribution of cetaceans estimated that a cetacean would be in the path of a ship 3,520 times a year: for the most part, the animals are able to dodge the threat, but collisions are nevertheless frequent.

The risk is multiple, characterized in particular by direct collision with the bow (generally resulting in the animal's death at speeds of 13 knots or more) or contact with the propeller, which shreds the animal (which may die instantly, be weakened and handed over to predators, or simply agonize for weeks). Incessant disturbance and underwater noise are other, more diffuse threats.

The species most easily affected by collisions are the larger, less agile species, such as the fin whale or the sperm whale, which are also those whose populations renew themselves most slowly. In the case of these two species, scientific studies have shown that 6% of individuals photo-identified at sea and almost 20% of stranded individuals showed signs of collision. Collisions are the leading cause of unnatural mortality for these two species within the Pelagos Sanctuary, increasing their mortality rate by 20%.

It is estimated that more than ten fin whales die every year in the Mediterranean (eight to forty according to WWF) as a result of ship strikes, and many more are injured or crippled.

To limit the danger, the Souffleurs d'Écume association has developed the REPCET (Real-time Plotting of Cetaceans) software, which equips some forty large vessels and enables them to report cetaceans encountered on the surface; it has been mandatory in the Pelagos Sanctuary since 2016.

=== Pollution ===
The Coalition for an Exemplary Mediterranean in 2030 estimates that a total of 600,000 tonnes of waste are dumped into the Mediterranean every year, a phenomenon exacerbated by the fact that this enclosed sea tends to concentrate pollution.

Marine pollution is of two kinds: macroelements ("garbage"), which animals can ingest at the risk of suffocating, and dissolved microelements (heavy metals, pesticides, medicines, industrial products, etc.), which end up in the feeding environment and can be bioaccumulated by cetaceans, almost all of which are long-lived superpredators at the top of the food chain. The fact that the Mediterranean is an enclosed sea, closely bordered by highly industrialized, densely populated countries with under-equipped waste management facilities, further exacerbates the situation.

==== Macro-waste ====
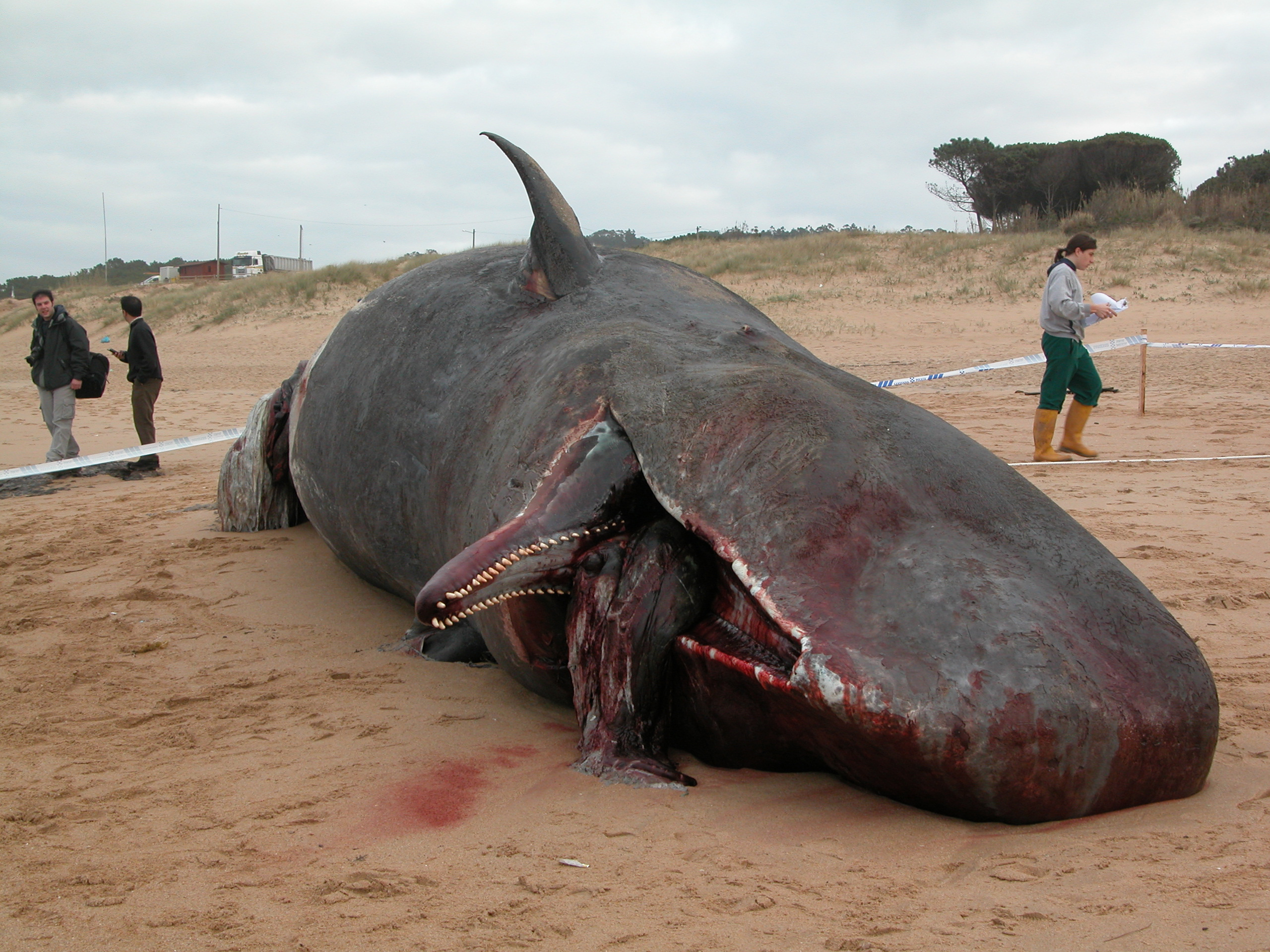
Sperm whale stranded on a beach in Spain.

Macro-waste varies enormously in size, from abandoned fishing nets hundreds or even thousands of meters long – a death trap for even the largest whales – to microscopic microplastics suspended in the water. Moreover, when macroplastics break down into microplastics, they also release toxic soluble compounds such as phthalates into the water.

As far as microplastics are concerned, the Mediterranean is probably the sea with the highest concentration in the world, and WWF France estimates that "Nearly 269,000 tonnes of plastic waste made up of more than 5,000 billion particles float on the oceans".

According to a study by the Pelagic Cetacean Research Institute in Athens, plastic ingestion is the main cause of mortality for sperm whales in the Mediterranean. For example, a male sperm whale found near Mykonos, Greece, had ingested over a hundred plastic objects (including plastic supermarket bags), which clogged his digestive tract and condemned him to a slow, painful death. Scientists estimate that another, found in Spain, had ingested 64 tonnes of plastic waste over the course of its life.

==== Dissolved pollutants ====
All studies carried out in the Mediterranean have shown a worrying bioaccumulation of numerous soluble pollutants in cetaceans, five to ten times higher than that observed in their Atlantic congeners.

A study carried out in 2019 on a sample of 240 cetaceans showed that fin whales, sperm whales and pilot whales are all contaminated by phthalates, toxic plasticizers present in a large number of plastic wastes.

DEHP, one of the most toxic phthalates, has an average concentration of 580 μg/kg (up to 1,060 μg/kg depending on the study) in fin whales, more than double the permitted limit for commercial fish. As phthalates are not bioaccumulative, this result shows that exposure is chronic and permanent.

PCBs (highly toxic, poorly biodegradable and bioaccumulative industrial wastes) and DDT derivatives (toxic, poorly biodegradable and bioaccumulative pesticides), banned for over forty years, are still detected in cetacean blubber, affecting their ability to resist disease or their fertility.

Another common source of contamination is PBDEs (brominated flame retardants), which can cause, among other things, hormonal disruption in cetaceans, impairing their fertility.

Heavy metals (notably mercury, lead and arsenic) are also found in large quantities in seawater as a result of human activities and negligence, and are also irremediably bioaccumulated by cetaceans, weakening them and leading to premature death.

Hydrocarbons (oil) are also common in the Mediterranean, where a third of the world's fuel oil traffic passes through, and many ships engage in illegal "degassing" (emptying) in the open sea. Around 400,000 tonnes of hydrocarbons are discharged into the Mediterranean every year. These hydrocarbons cause irritation, asphyxiation and intoxication in cetaceans, depending on their composition and concentration.

Most bioaccumulable metabolic contaminants are found in smaller quantities in females than in males: this is because they are stored in fat, including mammary fat, which means that females "discharge" part of their load in the milk they feed their young, passing on toxins from one generation to the next.

=== Deterioration of the acoustic environment ===
The dominant sense in cetaceans is not sight, but hearing (through echolocation), which enables them to communicate or locate prey or landforms several kilometers away, where sight stops at a few dozen meters underwater at best. Increased noise pollution seriously affects these animals, and can even lead to their death.

The main sources of noise pollution in the Mediterranean are maritime traffic (very intense and particularly dense in certain corridors such as the Alboran, Aegean and Tyrrhenian seas), but also sonar and certain other telemetry devices, seismic prospecting, underwater drilling, certain oceanographic experiments, military activities, and other acoustic nuisances originating from the coast and propagating in the water.

Since 2010, France has officially recognized noise pollution as one of the forms of marine pollution, whether "direct or indirect in the marine environment", in the wake of the Grenelle de la mer and via the Grenelle II law. It has set two environmental objectives in this field through the Marine Strategy Framework Directive: D11-OE01 (impulsive noise) and D11-OE02 (continuous noise of anthropogenic origin).

=== Tourist oversolicitation ===
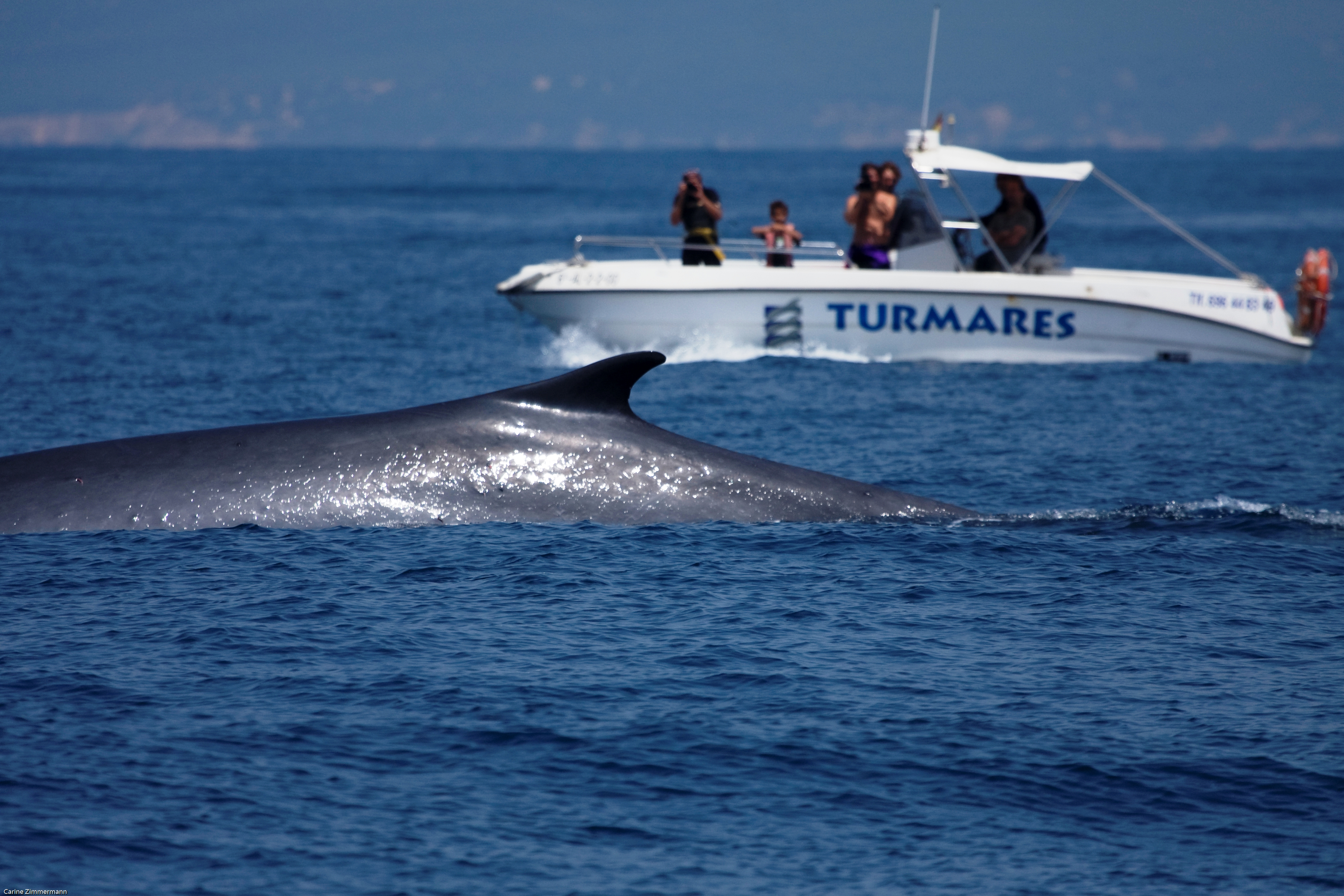
Tourists watching a fin whale in the Strait of Gibraltar.

Cetaceans are particularly charismatic and popular with the general public. As a result, "whale watching" is a booming economic sector, and for some operators, cetacean watching is sometimes coupled with "whale jumping", i.e. the launching of tourists close to the animals, often in a brutal, even dangerous manner. In this way, peaceful observation can sometimes turn into a veritable harassment industry, with animals tracked by aerial observation and pursued by dozens of vessels. According to the Groupe de recherche sur les cétacés (GREC), this harassment, which is illegal in French waters, can prevent the targeted animals from feeding or resting.

To prevent any adverse effects on these animals, strict rules govern this activity, which is further reinforced in marine protected areas (MPAs) such as the Pelagos Sanctuary. In many regions, charters and codes of conduct are in place, as are labels for sustainable whale watching.

French law prohibits, among other things, "any intentional disturbance of cetaceans (including harassment or pursuit), as well as any degradation of their resting or breeding areas".

== Protection ==
=== International agreements ===
==== Worldwide ====
The International Whaling Commission (IWC), set up in 1946, has condemned cetacean hunting since 1982, and no Mediterranean country is opposed to it or in clear breach.

At a global level, Mediterranean cetaceans have also been protected by the Convention on the Conservation of Migratory Species of Wild Animals (CMS or Bonn Convention) since 1979 (all Mediterranean countries except Turkey are party to it), the Convention on Biological Diversity (CBD) since 2010, and since 2015 the United Nations' Sustainable Development Goals (SDGs).

==== In the Mediterranean basin ====
The General Fisheries Commission for the Mediterranean (GFCM) was created in 1949 by an international agreement under Article XIV of the FAO Constitution. Its area of competence is the Mediterranean, the Black Sea and adjacent waters.

In 1976, the 21 countries bordering this sea ratified the Convention for the Protection of the Marine Environment and the Coastal Region of the Mediterranean (also known as the "Barcelona Convention"), aimed at preventing and reducing marine pollution in the Mediterranean Sea and ensuring the sustainable development of the socio-ecosystems that depend on it. It provides the legal framework for the Mediterranean Action Plan (MAP), approved in 1975 and drawn up within the framework of the Regional Seas Programme of the United Nations Environment Programme (UNEP), and has notably defined new "Specially Protected Areas of Mediterranean Importance" (SPAMIs).

ACCOBAMS area of application.

With specific regard to cetaceans, an Agreement on the Conservation of Cetaceans of the Black Sea, Mediterranean Sea and Contiguous Atlantic Area (ACCOBAMS) was signed in 1996, and came into force on June 1, 2001, with the aim of protecting the important cetacean populations that reside or migrate there.

Other agreements bind certain countries, such as the RAMOGE agreement, signed in 1976 between France, Monaco and Italy, to create a pilot zone for preventing and combating pollution of the marine environment, which served as a preliminary to the Pelagos Sanctuary.

==== At European level ====
At European level, one of the first significant coordinated efforts to protect marine life was the first Common Fisheries Policy (CFP) in 1970.

However, in terms of nature conservation, we had to wait for the Bern Convention (Council of Europe Convention on the Conservation of European Wildlife and Natural Habitats) signed in 1979, the first international treaty aimed at protecting both species (including cetaceans) and habitats, and which was signed by fifty countries, including all the countries of the European Union and several nearby and African countries. This was followed by the Habitats Directive (adopted in 1995), which established protected areas that became the Natura 2000 network of sites, including since 2008 "Natura 2000 at sea" sites. Also in 2008, Europe adopted the Marine Strategy Framework Directive, which defines "good environmental status" as the objective to be achieved for EU waters (based on an ecosystem approach). The Water Framework Directive, adopted in 2000, also has a maritime component.

Several other directives deal with cetaceans, such as the regulation of January 20, 1981, which prohibits the import of cetacean products for commercial purposes into the European Community.

=== National regulations ===
In France, all cetacean species are strictly protected by law. According to the decree of October 20, 1970, "It is forbidden to destroy, pursue or capture by any means whatsoever, even without the intention of killing them, marine mammals of the Delphinidae family", and according to the decree of July 27, 1995 "are prohibited on national territory, including the economic zone defined in article 1 of the aforementioned amended law of July 16, 1976, and at all times, the destruction, mutilation, capture or intentional removal, naturalization of marine mammals of the following species or, whether alive or dead, their transport, peddling, use, offering for sale, sale or purchase". The decree of July 1, 2011 "fixing the list of marine mammals protected on national territory and the terms and conditions of their protection" prohibits "the intentional destruction, mutilation, capture or removal including biological sampling, intentional disturbance including approaching animals to a distance of less than 100 meters in marine protected areas [...], and the pursuit or harassment of animals in the natural environment" for all marine mammals (cetaceans, pinnipeds and sirenians).

The Law for the Reconquest of Biodiversity, Nature and Landscapes, promulgated on August 9, 2016, notably requires in Article L334-2-2 of the Environmental Code the installation of anti-collision devices on vessels over 24 m flying the French flag and regularly sailing in marine sanctuaries.

France also has an "action plan for the protection of cetaceans", whose steering committee is co-chaired by the Department of Water and Biodiversity (DEB) of the Ministry of Ecological Transition and the Department of Maritime Fisheries and Aquaculture (DPMA) of the Ministry of Agriculture and Food.

Most other Mediterranean Countries have adopted similar regulations to some extent.

=== Marine protected areas ===
==== Parks, reserves, protected areas and sites ====
In 2020, the Mediterranean included some 1,087 marine protected areas (MPAs), representing 209,303 km^{2} (including 133,890 km^{2} of "sanctuaries", see next section), corresponding to 8.33% of the Mediterranean – but of which only 0.04% are strictly off-limits to fishing. These areas have a wide variety of designations: national parks, marine parks, marine reserves, Natura 2000 sites at sea, etc.

The Mediterranean network of marine protected areas is run by MedPAN (Mediterranean Protected Areas Network), a non-governmental organization based in Marseille, tasked with federating MPAs throughout the region, and promoting the sharing of experience and joint mobilization on common issues across the Mediterranean basin. Together with other regional and national agencies, it contributes to the harmonization of best practices for the protection of cetaceans within Mediterranean MPAs.

According to Aichi Target C.11 (adopted by the Convention on Biological Diversity in 2010), the aim is to have at least one tenth of the Mediterranean under significant protected status and with a management plan.

In addition to MPAs stricto sensu, there are also "other area-based effective conservation measures" (AMCEs), introduced in 2010 by the Convention on Biological Diversity, including fishing restriction areas (FRAs) and particularly vulnerable sea areas (PSSAs). All these areas are listed in the MAPAMED (Marine Protected Areas in the Mediterranean) database.

==== Sanctuaries ====
Two marine areas specifically protecting cetaceans are dedicated to them in the Mediterranean; they have the status of Specially Protected Areas of Mediterranean Importance (SPAMI) and together cover 133,890 km^{2}:

- The Pelagos Sanctuary, created in 2002 by France, Italy and Monaco to protect the marine mammals that frequent it, covering almost the entire Corso-Liguro-Provençal basin (87,589 km^{2});
- The Mediterranean Cetacean Migratory Corridor (Corredor de Migración de Cetáceos del Mediterráneo, or "Spanish Corridor"), created in 2018 between the Valencian and Catalan coasts and the Balearic Islands(46,613 km^{2});
- there is also a proposed Oceanid Sanctuary to the west of Cyprus (8,326 km^{2}).

The Pelagos Sanctuary is the result of an agreement signed on November 25, 1999, by France, Italy and Monaco, and came into force on February 21, 2002, after receiving SPAMI status in 2001.) It covers a total surface area of 87,500 km^{2} and 2,000 km of coastline, making it the largest marine protected area in the Mediterranean. Twelve cetacean species can be found here (representing 15% of known cetacean species and 60% of Mediterranean species, including the eight common species), including some 450 bottlenose dolphins, 750 fin whales and 35,200 striped dolphins.

The Mediterranean Cetacean Migratory Corridor was established by Spain in 2018 under the aegis of the UN Environment's Mediterranean Action Plan (MAP). It is a major route in the seasonal migration of cetaceans, particularly fin whales, between the African coast (wintering site) and the northern Mediterranean (summer feeding and breeding site). The area is also frequented by a dozen other species of marine mammals, such as the Blue and White Dolphin, Risso's dolphin, Cuvier's Whale and Humpback Whale. Covering an area of 87,589 km^{2}, it is the second largest MPA in the Mediterranean.

On both sites, navigation is subject to certain regulations in terms of shipping lanes, speed and equipment (pingers, REPCET program, etc.), and cetacean populations are subject to special monitoring.

=== Other measures ===
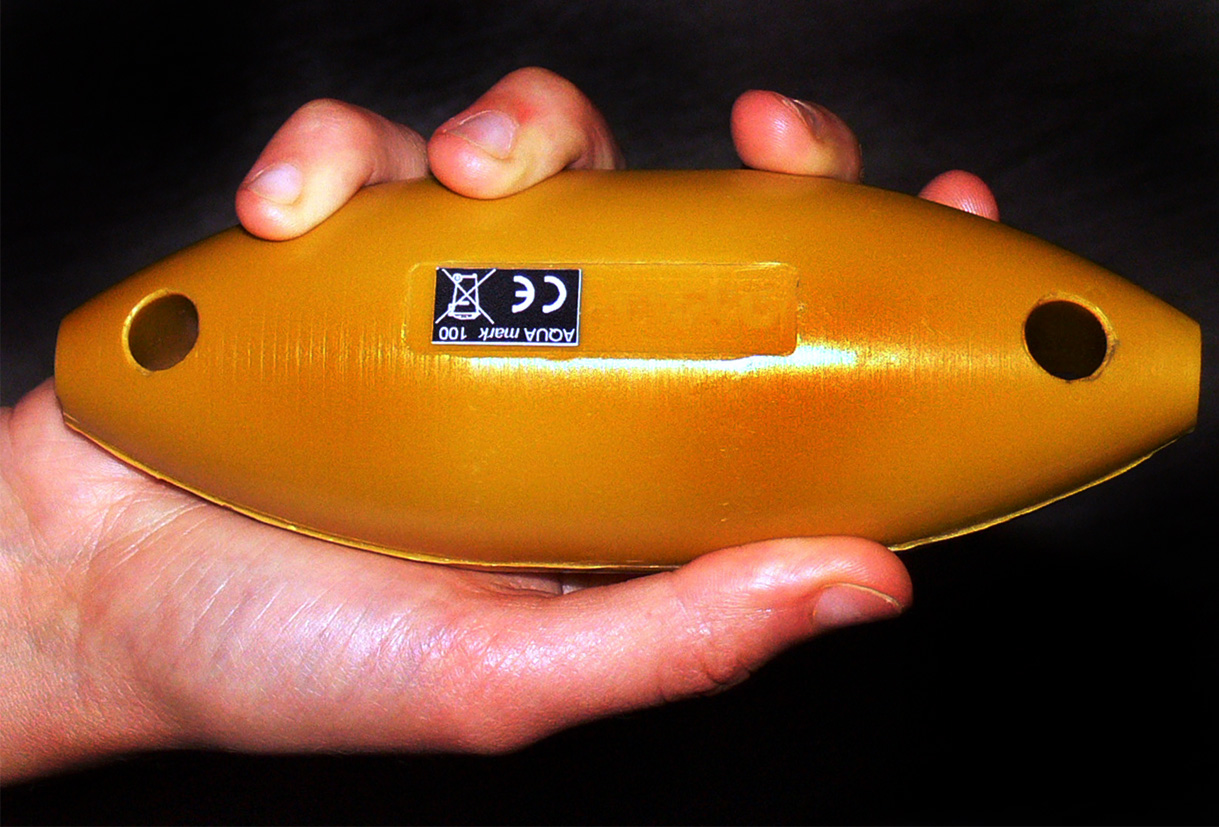
Example of a "pinger", an acoustic deterrent designed to keep odontocetes away from nets and trawls.

Several regulatory measures exist and depend on the goodwill of the players involved, notably charters, codes of good conduct, certifications, and the adoption of specific procedures or equipment.

Charters include the SAILS (Sustainable Actions for Innovative and Low-impact Shipping) charter of good shipping practice for the protection of the marine environment and coastline, which "calls for voluntary measures to reduce the underwater noise impact of ships by shipowners and cruise operators".

The REPCET (Real-time Plotting of Cetaceans) program, developed by the Souffleurs d'Écume association, enables ships to geolocate large cetaceans to warn other vessels of their presence on a shipping route. This system is mandatory in the Pelagos Sanctuary and recommended elsewhere.

Numerous technical devices help seafarers to keep cetaceans out of harm's way (especially from nets), thanks in particular to acoustic tools such as pingers and other acoustic deterrents.

Trawls can also be fitted with escape hatches that can be activated by large animals (particularly sea turtles and cetaceans), enabling them to escape the trap while retaining the target species; some nets are easier for cetaceans to spot (using acoustic reflectors in particular), or that can be broken.

Finally, several associations are working to conserve Mediterranean cetaceans, including the international NGO WWF and the IUCN, as well as local associations: for example, in 2020, the Groupement d'intérêt scientifique pour les mammifères marins de Méditerranée (GIS3M), the Groupe d'étude des cétacés de Méditerranée (GECEM) and the Souffleurs d'Écume association merged to form MIRACETI.

== Scientific research ==
Because of the biological, ecological and social stakes involved, Mediterranean cetaceans are an important research topic for many scientists. This research is organized by several categories of players:

- Universities, notably in France, Spain, Italy and Greece (e.g. the Institute for Pelagic Cetacean Research in Athens), but also occasionally in the USA;
- International projects such as the ACCOBAMS Survey Initiative (ASI), which aims to "establish an integrated and coordinated cetacean monitoring program that will contribute to a better conservation status of cetaceans and their habitat", developed jointly with riparian countries, several other regional agencies and the IUCN;
- Independent research groups such as MIRACETI and the Groupe de recherche sur les cétacés (GREC), which manages the cetaces.org website;
- Associations and NGOs such as WWF (for example, through their "Cap Cétacés" project), IUCN, MedPAN and France Nature Environnement, often through collaboration, sponsorship or scientific monitoring.

The Pelagos Sanctuary website maintains an up-to-date list of authorized scientific projects within its perimeter.

== See also ==
- Cetaceans of the Caribbean
- Ligurian Sea Cetacean Sanctuary
- Agreement on the Conservation of Cetaceans of the Black Sea, Mediterranean Sea and Contiguous Atlantic Area
- Agreement on the Conservation of Small Cetaceans of the Baltic, North East Atlantic, Irish and North Seas
- MedPAN
- International Whaling Commission
- Dauphin of France
