= Boto =

Portuguese terminology for dolphins

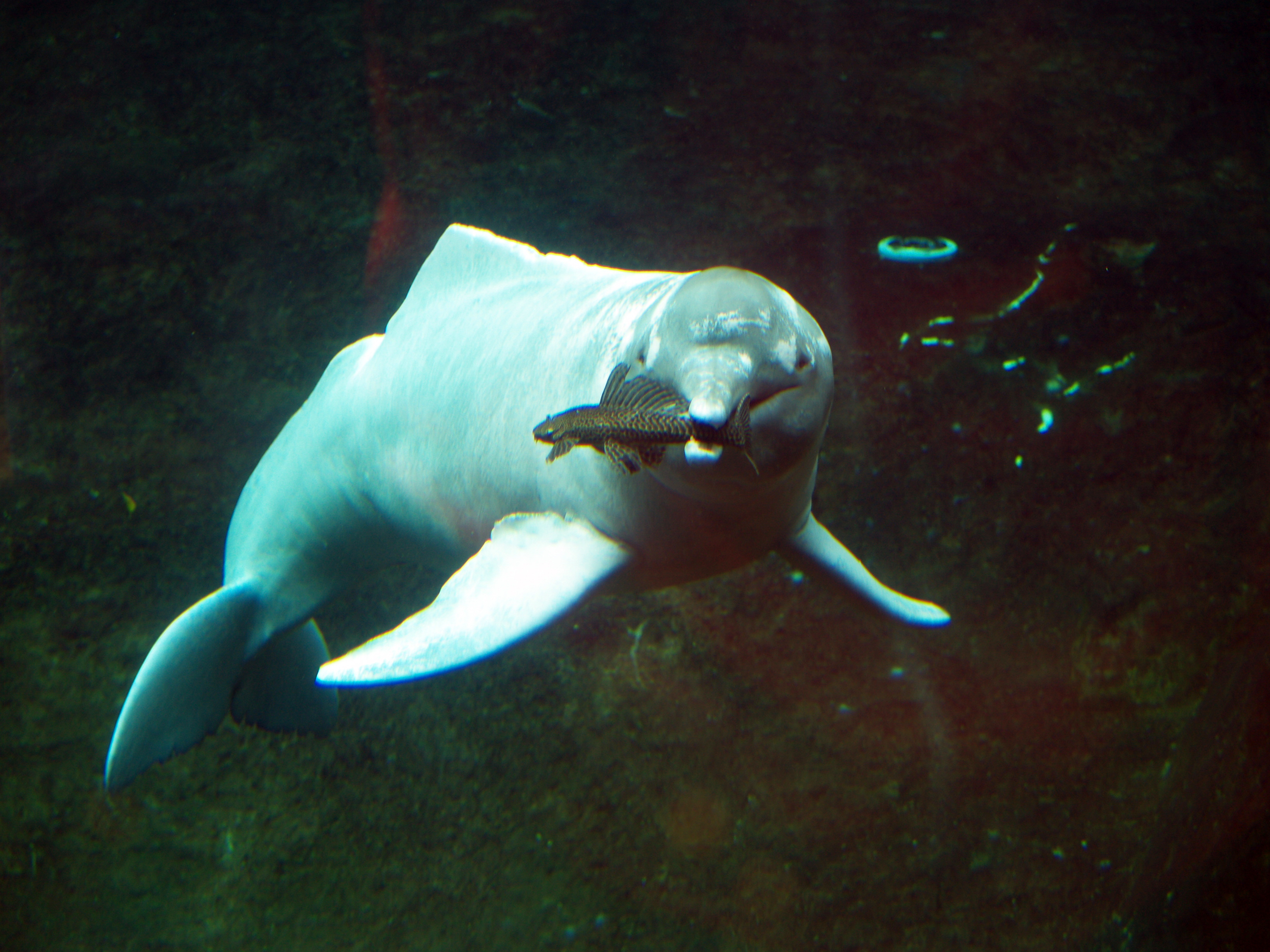
An Amazon river dolphin

Boto is a Portuguese terminology often used to describe river dolphins, particularly those native to the Amazon and the Orinoco River tributaries (even though some species are native to salt or brackish water environments), as well as some species of oceanic dolphins and porpoises. The most famous example is the Amazon river dolphin. They are usually pink in color and tends to become more pink in age. The degree of pinkness would be a sign of maturity in males and could therefore have the same display function as antlers in red deer or the tusk in narwhals. They become more pink in age because of scar tissue that takes over their whole body. They also lose some of their pigment throughout their adolescence, turning them light pink.

== Classification ==
The botos are a paraphyletic group, defined largely by their evolutionary convergences.

The genus Sotalia is divided into two species. The Guiana dolphin (S. guianensis) is distributed in the Atlantic, from Tramandaí, Rio Grande do Sul, Brazil, and northwards. The tucuxi (S. fluviatilis) lives in the rivers of the Amazon.

The Burmeister's porpoise (Phocoena spinipinnis) is marine and lives from Santa Catarina to the south.

The Lahille's bottlenose dolphin (Tursiops truncatus gephyreus or Tursiops gephyreus) is marine and lives in the coastal waters of the Southwestern South Atlantic Ocean, ranging from southern Brazil down to central Argentina.

The Amazon river dolphin (Inia geoffrensis) thrives in fresh water, is endemic to the Amazon basin, and is placed in the Endangered category of the IUCN.

The Araguaian river dolphin (I. araguaiaensis) is a newly identified species native to the Araguaia-Tocantins basin of Brazil.

The La Plata dolphin (Pontoporia blainvillei), another vulnerable Brazilian denizen, is a marine river dolphin that ranges from Espírito Santo, Brazil, to the south.

- Suborder Odontoceti
  - Superfamily Delphinoidea
    - Family Delphinidae
      - Genus Sotalia
        - Species Sotalia fluviatilis, tucuxi
        - Species Sotalia guianensis, costero
      - Genus Tursiops
        - Species Tursiops gephyreus, Lahille's bottlenose dolphin
    - Family Phocoenidae
      - Genus Phocoena
        - Species Phocoena spinipinnis, Burmeister's porpoise
  - Superfamily Inioidea
    - Family Iniidae
      - Genus Inia
        - Species Inia araguaiaensis
        - Species Inia geoffrensis
          - Subspecies Inia geoffrensis geoffrensis, Amazon river dolphin
          - Subspecies Inia geoffrensis boliviensis, Bolivian river dolphin
          - Subspecies Inia geoffrensis humboldtiana, Humboldt's river dolphin
    - Family Pontoporiidae
      - Genus Pontoporia
        - Species Pontoporia blainvillei, la Plata dolphin or Franciscana

== Folklore ==
The "boto" of the Amazon River regions of northern Brazil are described according to local lore as taking the form of a human or merman, also known as boto-cor-de-rosa ("pink boto" in Portuguese) and with the habit of seducing human women and impregnating them.
