= Cantão =

Tropical forest ecosystem located in the central Araguaia river basin

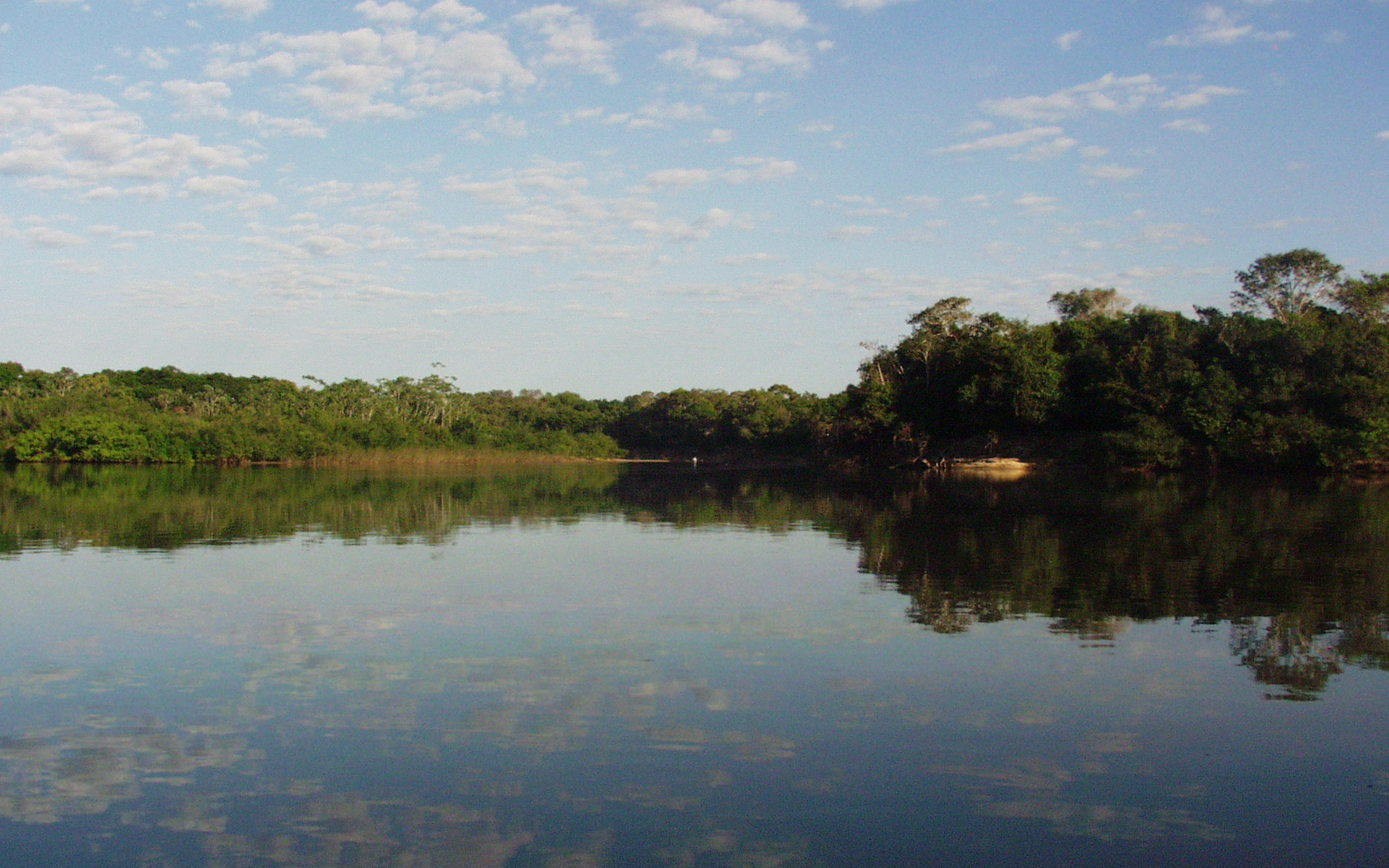
Lago Grande, a large oxbow lake in Cantão State Park

Cantão is a tropical forest ecosystem located in the central Araguaia river basin, the southeastern edge of the Amazon biome, in the Brazilian state of Tocantins. It is one of the biologically richest areas of the eastern Amazon, with over 700 species of birds, nearly 300 species of fish (more than in all of Europe), and large populations of endangered species such as the giant otter and the black cayman. About 90% of the Cantão ecosystem is protected within Cantão State Park.

== Ecological importance ==
Due to its geographical location and topography, the Cantão ecosystem combines several unique features that contribute to its high biodiversity and productivity:

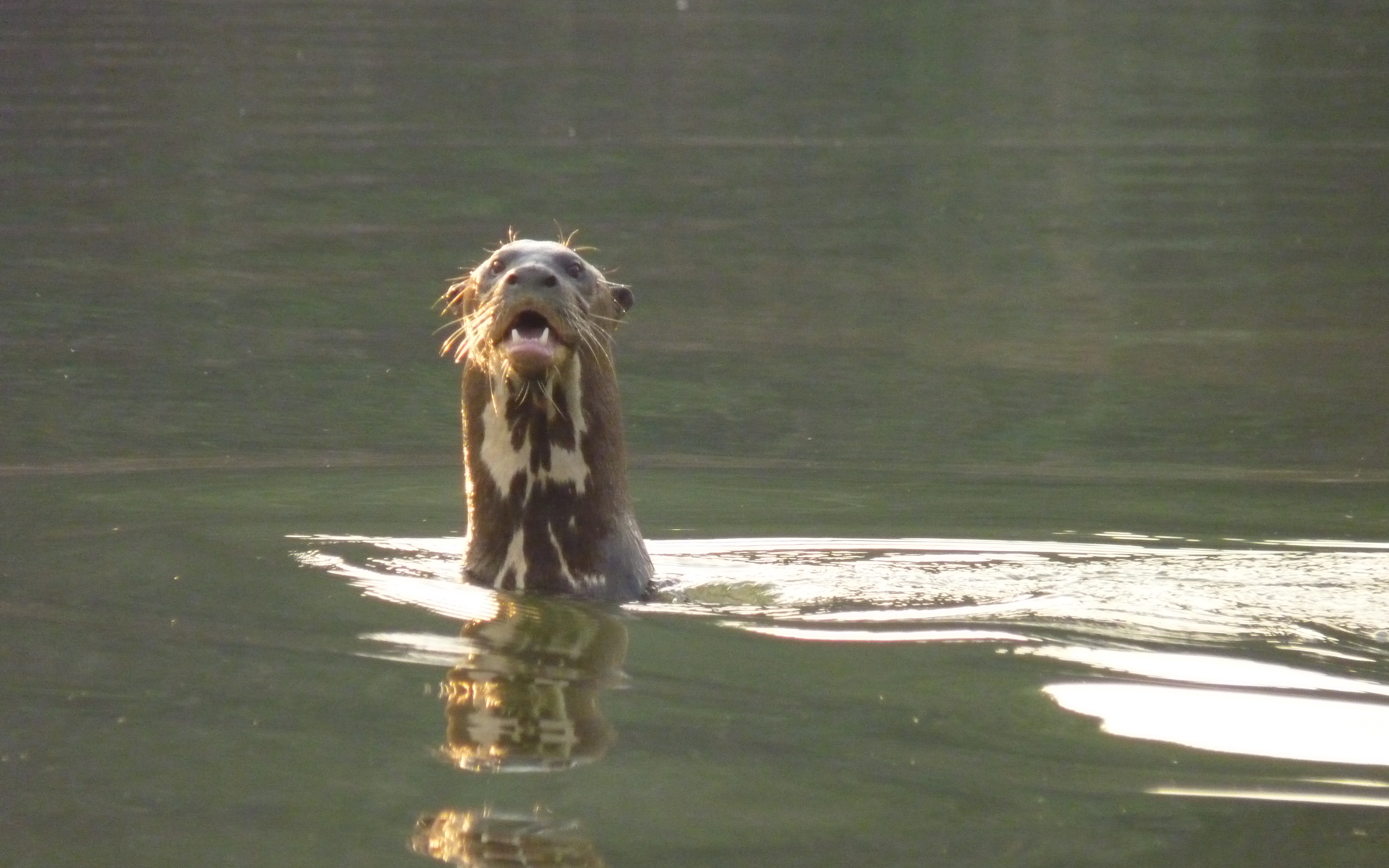
Giant otter

- It is located at the ecotone between the cerrado and Amazon biomes of Brazil. The cerrado has the highest biodiversity of all the world's savannas, and the Amazon has the highest rainforest diversity. At the Cantão region, this ecotone is particularly sharp, resulting in species from both biomes coexisting within a relatively small area.
- It is at the center of the Araguaia migratory corridor, which connects the Pantanal wetlands to the Amazon river system. Waterbirds in great numbers move seasonally up and down this corridor as water levels change and feeding and breeding opportunities appear.
- It contains 900 of the estimated 1100 oxbow lakes of the Araguaia river. A great proportion of the region's fish species breed and feed in oxbow lakes, especially during the low water season, when the lakes are isolated from the rivers. Oxbow lakes are also the preferred habitat of giant otters and black caymans.
- It contains the largest continuous flooded forest expanse of the Araguaia basin. During the wet season, the igapó flooded forest that covers most of Cantão is flooded by water six to eight meters deep. This creates a very productive habitat for fish and other aquatic life, as the flooded forest trees provide not only foraging substrate and cover, but also abundant food in the form of fruit and insects that constantly drop into the water.
- It has the highest freshwater fish diversity of any protected area in the world, with at least 273 documented species occurring in the park.

== Geography ==
Roughly in the middle of its course, the Araguaia river splits into two forks, with the western one retaining the name Araguaia and the eastern one being called Rio Javaés. They flow their separate ways for over 400 meandering kilometers before reuniting, thus forming the Ilha do Bananal, the world's largest river island. Where the Javaés pours back into the main Araguaia, it forms a broad inland delta where it pours back into the main Araguaia, a 100,000 hectare triangular expanse of igapó flooded forest, blackwater river channels, and oxbow lakes. This inland delta is called Cantão.

During the wet season, from December to May, the waters of the Araguaia and the Javaés rise between six and nine meters over their dry season levels. The Javaés then overflows its banks and fills its broad low floodplain, which becomes an immense mosaic of lakes, marshes, and gallery forest. The water becomes saturated with tannins from the submerged vegetation, and the Javaés becomes a typical blackwater river, its waters turning considerably darker than those of the Araguaia. All this water is funneled through the delta of the Javaés, and during the floods, almost all of the Cantão ecosystem is submerged by fast flowing black water, for in effect the Javaés now becomes a single sheet of water nearly twenty kilometers wide, running through the open channels and under the canopy of the flooded forests of its delta with equal swiftness.

== Natural communities ==
Five distinct natural communities, each with its own unique species assemblages, occur within the Cantão ecosystem:

=== Igapó ===
Igapós are forests which are flooded for four to seven months every year by blackwater rivers. The igapós of Cantão begin to flood in December, and by March the water in the forest is five to eight meters deep, and running between the trees at speeds of one and two knots. Only trees adapted to such extreme conditions grow in the igapós, and the rushing annual floods mean that the understory is unusually open for a tropical forest. Many flooded forest trees flower and fruit during this season, and the fruit fall into the water and are eaten by fish, which disperse the seeds.

The most common large tree species in the igapó forests of Cantão are the landi and the piranheira. Both of these commonly grow over twenty meters in height, and both of them drop their fruit into the water, to be dispersed by fish. The piranheira tree earned its name due to a further contribution it makes to the aquatic ecosystem: it sprouts new leaves after the peak of the floods, which attract great numbers of caterpillars. These drop into the water whenever the wind shakes the tree tops, attracting schools of small piranha and other omnivorous fish.

The igapós of Cantão have a rich bird fauna, including some habitat specialists. One of the most common is the band-tailed antbird, which only nests during the flood season, on the tops of isolated shrubs, only a meter or two above the water. It does so to avoid the abundant predators, which include roaming bands of black-striped capuchin monkeys and coatis.

=== Moist deciduous forest ===
In Cantão, moist deciduous forest occurs wherever the ground is high enough to remain above peak flood levels in most years. It is lower in canopy height than the igapó forests, and its undergrowth is thicker and more entangled. It also displays high plant species diversity, including abundant epiphytes like orchids and bromeliads. Many of the plant species of this natural community are drawn from the nearby cerrado.

During the dry season, when up to 90 days can go by with no rain at all, many of the trees in the moist deciduous forest drop their leaves. During this season there is a considerable risk of fire, whether natural or caused by man. Natural fires due to lightning are quite common, but tend to be quickly put out by the ensuing rain.

During the annual floods, deciduous forests are the only places where there is dry ground. They become the only feeding grounds available for bird species like the undulated tinamou, the bare-faced curassow, and the several species of wild pigeon that occur in Cantão. Many mammal species that don't do well on trees or in flooded areas also seek refuge in these forests, which consequently become prime hunting ground for the park's two large terrestrial predators, the jaguar and the puma.

=== Marshes ===
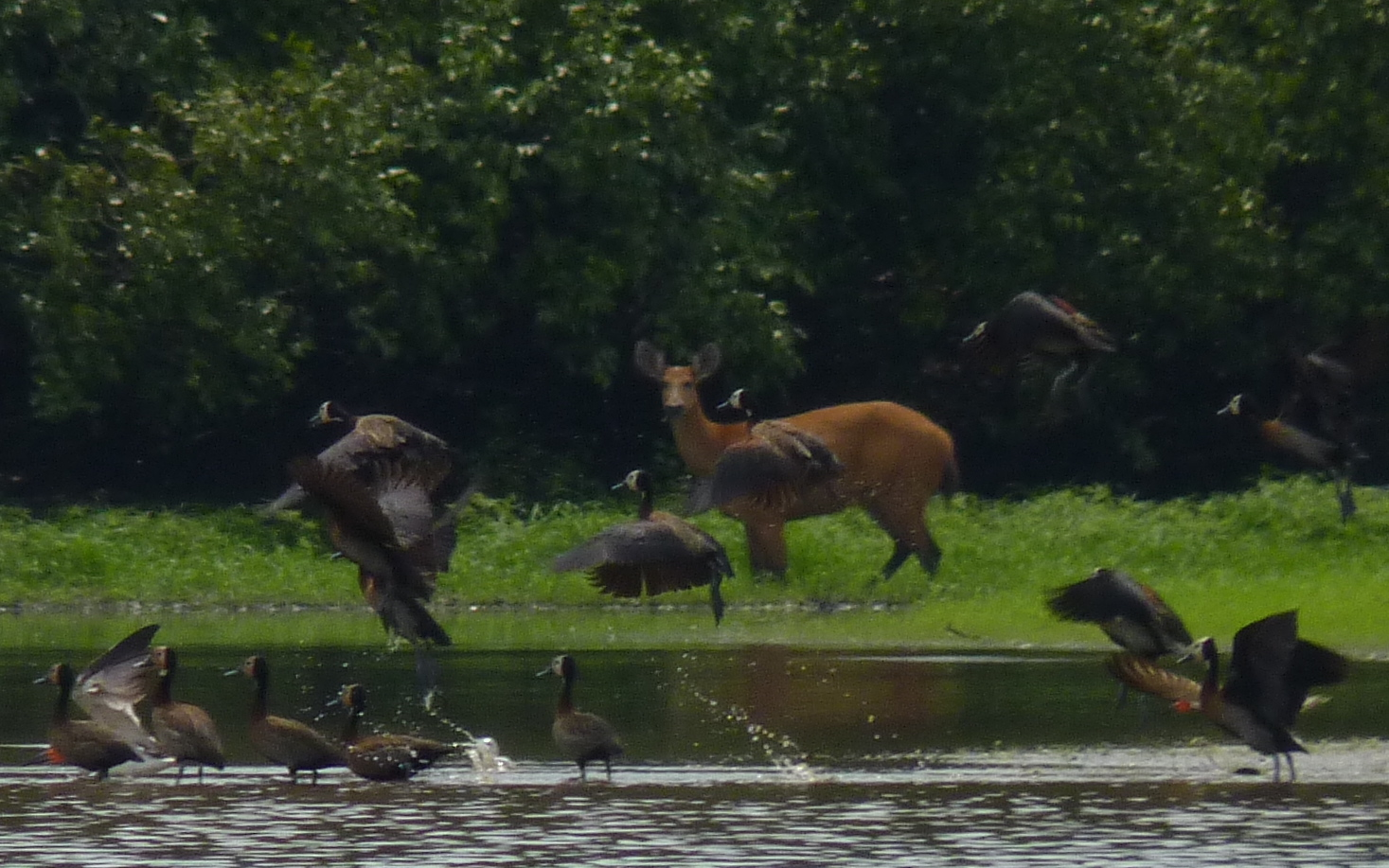
A marsh deer grazing among a flock of white-faced whistling ducks

Although forest vegetation predominates in the park, marshes, where grassy and shrubby vegetation is predominant, occur on the inside of river bends, at the ends of oxbow lakes, in channels that are in the process of closing, and at other places where recently deposited sediments are flooded by swift-moving water during the rainy season.

The marshes of Cantão hold a great diversity of plant life, and this becomes evident at the peak of the floods, when vines, shrubs, and floating vegetation flower, covering large areas with a mosaic of color. Most of these plants go on to produce fruit which are consumed by fish. In addition, broad mats of Paspalum repens grass and other floating vegetation with roots suspended in the current create a substrate for a very productive aquatic ecosystem. The roots of the vegetation are shaped so as to act like filters, trapping organic particles brought by the current, and doing so near the surface, where oxygen and sunlight are abundant. As a result, not only fish, but also fish predators like giant otters and the black-collared hawk move into the marshes to forage.

Marshes are also the prime breeding habitat for the park's abundant hoatzin population. The build their stick nests on the tops of isolated trees in the middle of the marshes, safe from terrestrial or arboreal predators. Many other species of bird also nest over marsh waters during the wet season, including the ubiquitous great kiskadee and the peculiar greater ani, which builds its communal nests in tangled vegetation over water.

=== Islands and beaches ===
Cantão State Park includes 24 sandy islands on the Araguaia river, as well as a large number of river sand beaches on bends of the channels that weave through the interior of the park. The sand itself is the primary habitat for a number of species. Black skimmers, yellow-billed terns, yellow-spotted river turtles, the enormous Amazon river turtle, and other species nest directly on the sand in great numbers. Their eggs attract nest predators like the crested caracara, the tayra, and even the jaguar, which also takes adult turtles at night when they climb up onto the beach to nest.

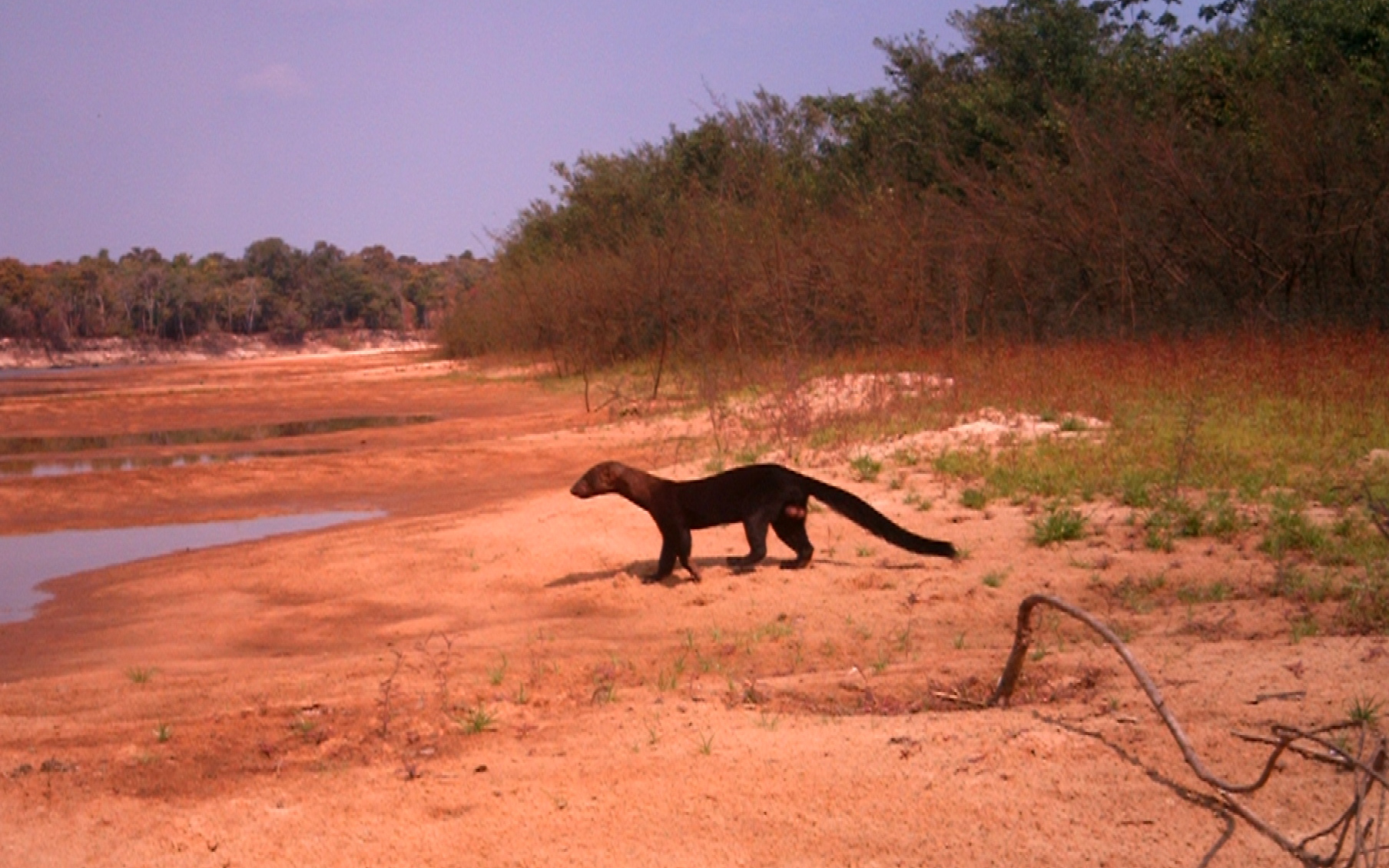
A male tayra emerges from a Sapium thicket to forage for turtle and bird nests on a beach inside the park.

Sandy beaches and mud banks are also the preferred feeding habitat for wading birds like the roseate spoonbill, the whispering ibis, and several species of ducks. Among the more remarkable inhabitants of river islands and large beaches is the northern screamer, which can be seen in the park throughout the year.

The vegetation growing on this sandy, nutrient-poor environment goes through several successional stages, starting with annual grasses and herbs, which are heavily grazed by mammals and ducks in the dry season and by fish when submerged in the wet season. The next stage is dominated by Sapium and Psidium bushes, both of which fruit during the annual floods, and have their seeds dispersed by fish, especially pacús. As the years pass, the ever-thickening mass of roots begins to accumulate detritus brought by the floods, and the formerly barren sands turn into soils capable of supporting a greater variety of plant species. Finally, a canopy of Cecropia trees forms above the bushes. The cecropias fruit year-round, and the dense stands that form in attract a great many frugivores which bring seeds from the surrounding forest. Over the decades, these seeds sprout and grow, overwhelming the cecropias, shading and stifling the undergrowth, and turning into an igapó flooded forest environment. However, further downstream, new sediments are being deposited, pioneer plants are sprouting on the sand, and all the beach and island successional stages are starting anew.

=== Backwaters ===
The backwaters of Cantão include oxbow lakes, forest ponds (which dry out completely by the end of the dry season), and hundreds of kilometers of narrow channels which crisscross the delta of the Javaés river. All these waterbodies have in common the fact that during the floods, they are all interconnected as the black waters of the Javaés river rise and flow over the entire landscape, while in the dry season they become isolated from one another.

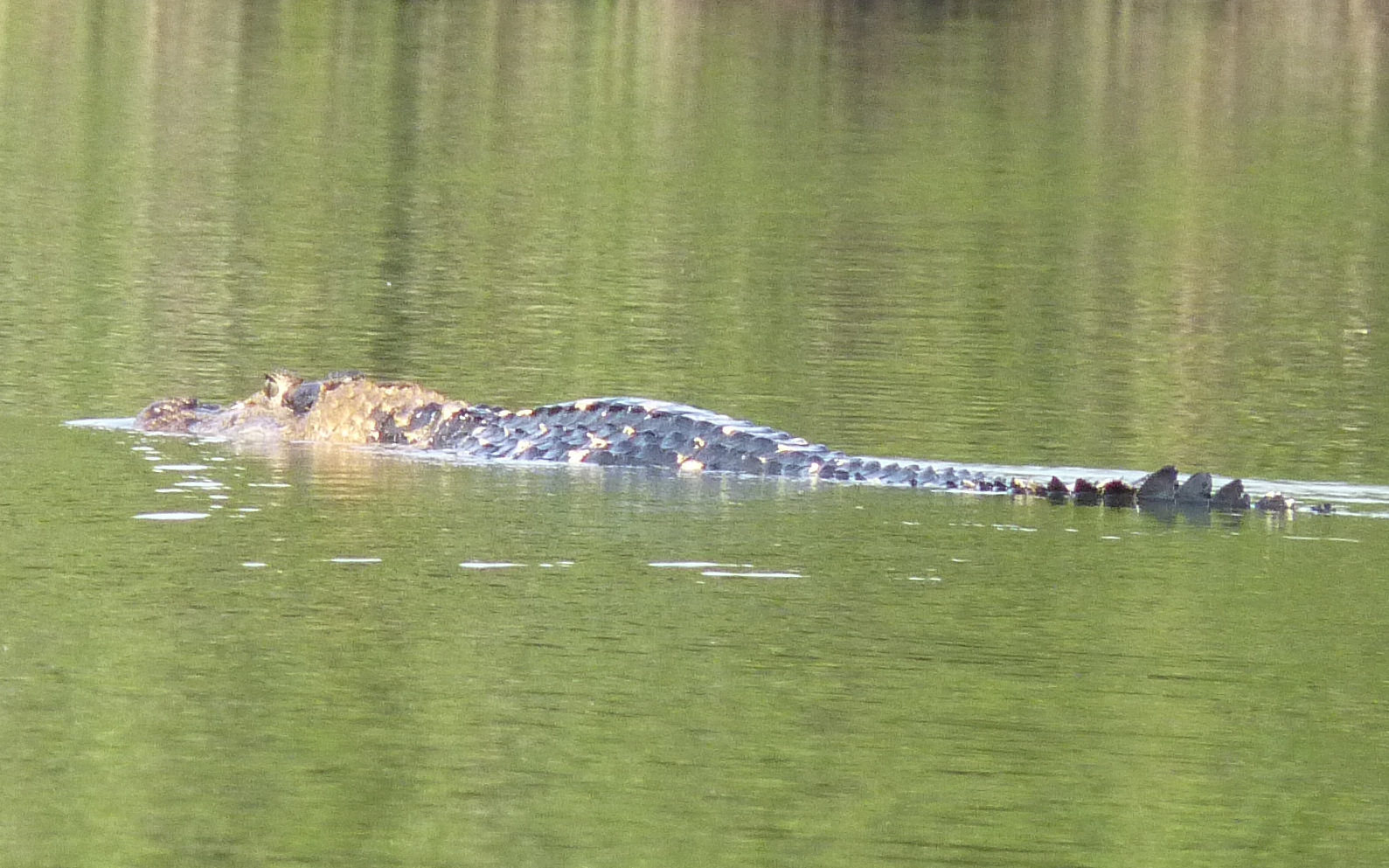
A five meter long black cayman cruises on a Cantão lake

There are 843 oxbow lakes within the borders of Cantão state park, and about 900 in the Javaés delta as a whole. The entire rest of the Araguaia wetlands contains just over 200 lakes, illustrating the importance of Cantão for the great river's ecosystem. Oxbow lakes are the site of reproduction for many species of fish, and for concentrating 80% of the basin's lakes, Cantão is known as the "nursery of the Araguaia." The peacock bass or tucunaré, one of Brazil's most popular freshwater gamefish, is one of many species which reproduces in the Cantão backwaters during the dry season. Another is the pirarucú, the world's largest freshwater fish, whose numbers are dwindling everywhere in the region due to relentless poaching. The remote and inaccessible lakes of the interior of Cantão are one of the last remaining sanctuaries for this species.

During the floods, almost every aquatic species in the park can be found in the interconnected backwaters. During the dry season, prey fish become concentrated in isolated water bodies, providing a veritable feast for predators like the giant otter, the Amazon river dolphin, the pirarucú, and the black and spectacled cayman. Along lake edges, five species of kingfisher, nine species of heron, and specialists like the sunbittern and the green ibis forage for fish and invertebrates. Neotropical cormorants and anhingas fish away from the shore. Even jaguars join in the feast, diving into forest pools to catch large fish, or sitting in ambush for them as they pass through the shallow water channels that connect deeper lakes.

== Endangered species ==
Four bird species in the IUCN's red list occur in Cantão: the chestnut-bellied guan, the crowned solitary eagle, the bananal antbird, and the Araguaia spinetail. The last two are endemic to the middle Araguaia. The bananal antbird occurs in igapó forest, and the Araguaia spinetail is a river island specialist. The park is also important habitat for ten nearctic migratory bird species, including the peregrine falcon and the osprey.

Eight mammal species on Brazil's endangered species list occur in Cantão. The flagship species is the giant otter, the most endangered large mammal in South America. The lakes of Cantão are an important reproductive are for this species. Other endangered mammal species that abound in the park include the jaguar, the marsh deer, and the bush dog. All three species are well adapted to the seasonally flooded conditions of the Cantão ecosystem. In addition, endangered cerrado species like the giant anteater and the giant armadillo occur in the park and remain in all but the highest floods, when they swim across the narrow Rio do Côco to the surrounding cerrado grasslands and scrub forest. During the dry season, a reverse migration takes place, with large numbers of large mammals and waterbirds from the dried out cerrado crossing into the park in search of water, green grass, and refuge from the seasonal fires of the cerrado. Cantão is thus a key protected area for the conservation of the cerrado of the middle Araguaia valley, which is some of the best preserved lowland cerrado left in Brazil.

The Araguaian river dolphin, endemic to the Araguaia basin and one of the most endangered cetaceans in the world, has its largest protected population in Cantão and in adjacent Araguaia national park.

== Cantão State Park ==
In 1998 the state of Tocantins created Cantão State Park, with 90,000 hectares, in order to protect this unique ecosystem. The park is managed by Naturatins, the state environmental agency. The park's headquarters and visitor center are located near the town of Caseara.

Cantão Park was formally opened for visitation in June 2013. Visitor infrastructure includes a visitor center featuring videos and interpretative displays, and an 18 km system of trails through the forest, including hiking trails and canoe trails. The trails give access to five pristine lakes in the interior of the park, where top predators such as black caiman, giant otters, and pirarucú fish can be seen. It is possible to stay overnight on a platform overlooking one of the lakes, and to ride on a canoe powered by electric motor, which facilitates the watching of wildlife such as hoatzins, waterbirds, and giant otters. All visitors must be accompanied by a trained local guide, a list of which is available at the park visitor center.

Visitors may stay and hire local guide services in the town of Caseara, which offers simple but clean accommodations and meals. Visitors can also hire guides to go exploring or sports fishing on the Araguaia river, as well as off-road bicycling and canoe/kayak tours. The nearest airport is in Palmas, 253 km away by paved road. Ecotourism operators in Palmas organize trips to Cantão, which may be combined with a visit to the famed Jalapão ecosystem.
