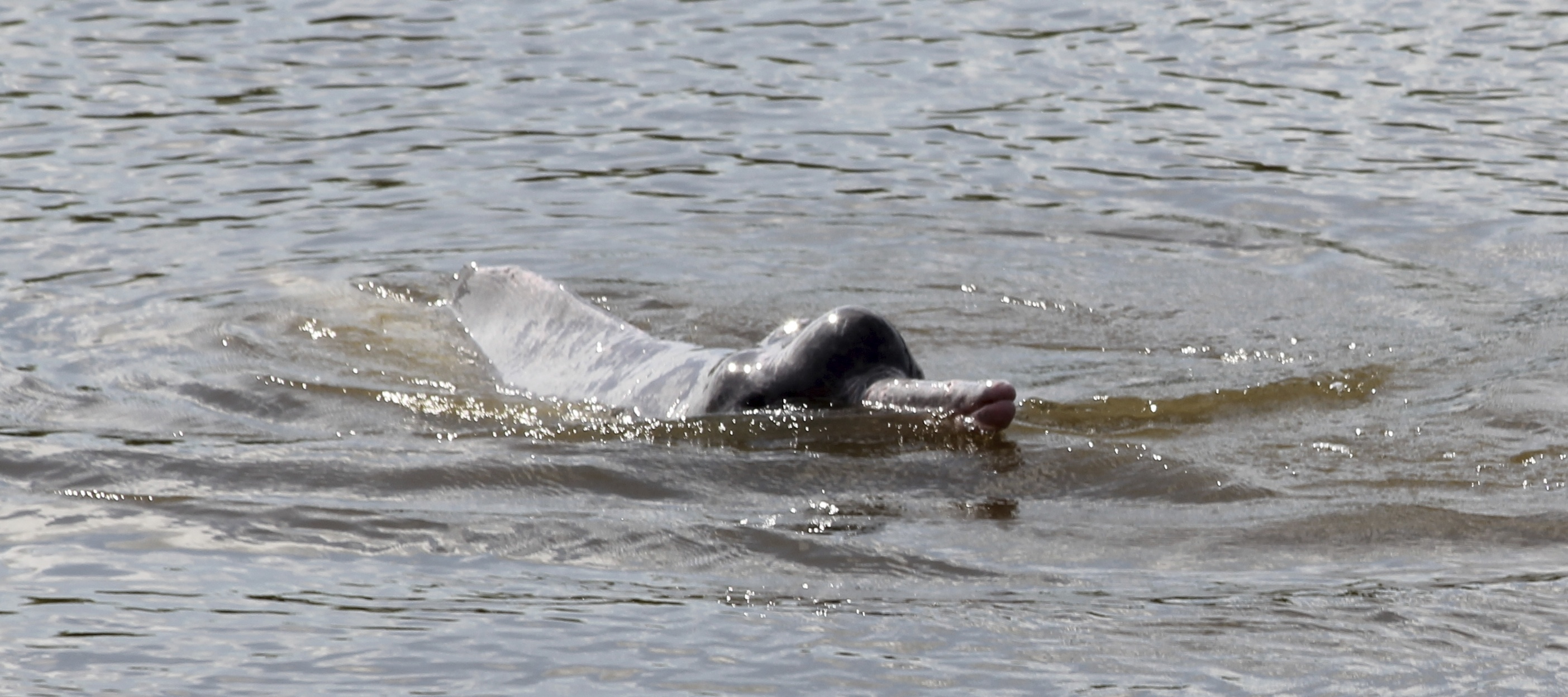
- An Araguaian river dolphin (Inia araguaiaensis) surfacing to breathe in Cantão State Park, Brazil

Conservation status
- CITES Appendix II

Scientific classification
- Kingdom: Animalia
- Phylum: Chordata
- Class: Mammalia
- Order: Artiodactyla
- Infraorder: Cetacea
- Family: Iniidae
- Genus: Inia
- Species: I. araguaiaensis

Binomial name
- Inia araguaiaensis Hrbek, Da Silva, Dutra, Farias, 2014
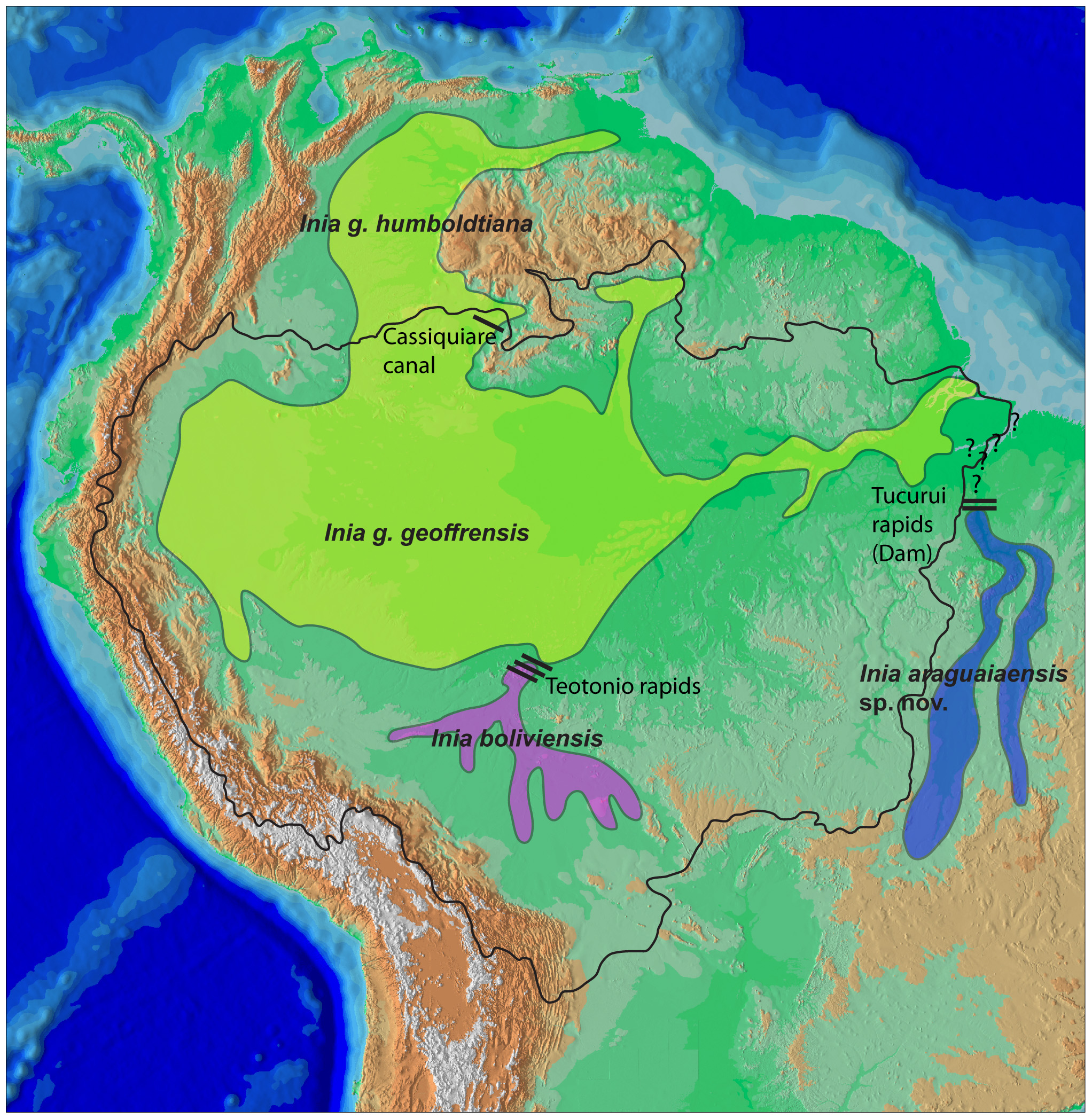
- Inia spp. ranges. I. araguaiaensis is in blue at right; I. geoffrensis and I. boliviensis are light green and purple, respectively.

= Araguaian river dolphin =

Species of mammal

The Araguaian river dolphin or Araguaian boto (Inia araguaiaensis) is a South American river dolphin population native to the Araguaia–Tocantins basin of Brazil.

== Discovery and species recognition ==
The recognition of I. araguaiaensis as a distinct species is still debated. It was originally distinguished from the Amazon river dolphin (Inia geoffrensis) in January 2014 on the basis of nuclear microsatellite and mitochondrial DNA data as well as differences in skull morphology (it generally has a wider skull). It also differs from the Amazon and Bolivian river dolphins in the number of teeth per hemimandible (24–28 versus 25–29 and 31–35, respectively).

However, I. araguaiaensis is still not recognized as a separate species by the Committee on Taxonomy of the Society for Marine Mammalogy, the largest international association of marine mammal scientists in the world. The Committee made these comments regarding the decision to not include I. araguaiaensis as an independent species: "Inia araguaiaensis, was described by Hrbek et al. (2014). However, this study only examined samples from two extremes of the distribution of Inia so is it unclear if the molecular differences observed represented real species-level separation or were due to sampling from two locations separated by a large distance. Diagnostic osteological differences were also reported. However, because this was based on the examination of very few specimens (only 2 for the new species and only 9 for I. geoffrensis), the authors' conclusions are very concerning."

== Description ==
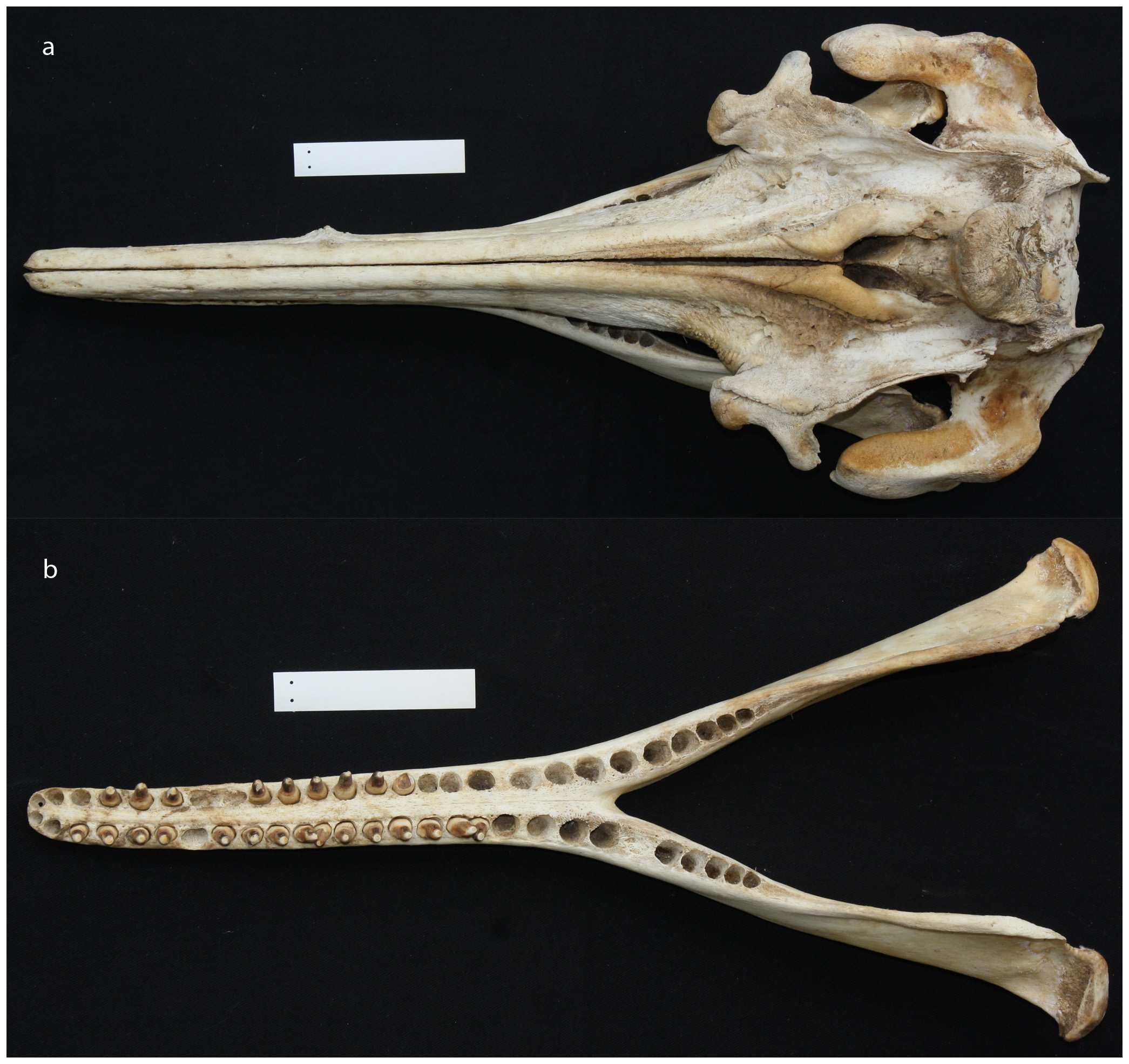
Cranium and mandible of holotype (ruler is 10 cm long)

Members of the genus are gray to pink in color and have a body length range from 1.53 to 2.6 m (5.0 to 8.5 ft). They have a dorsal ridge rather than a fin. Their neck vertebrae are unfused, allowing them to turn their heads sharply. Like other river dolphins, I. araguaiaensis has a prominent forehead and a much longer snout than those of most marine dolphins, as well as smaller eyes than marine dolphins. Because their aquatic environment is often turbid, their vision is not as well developed. River dolphins tend to be less active than marine dolphins. They feed mainly on fish, aided by echolocation.

== Communication ==
River dolphins have a complex set of acoustic calls that help shed light on their personalities, behaviors and interaction with other river dolphins. In a study by Gabriel Melo-Santos et. Al they analyzed frequency contours of 727 signals They found that these signals had a critical similarity value of 96% and frequency contours were categorized into 237 sound-types. Interestingly the most notable and frequent sounds were emitted when calves were present shedding light on a close and complex mother child relationship. The findings show that the acoustic sounds of river dolphins are incredibly complex and are similar to those of by social delphinids, such as orcas and pilot whales.

== Taxonomy ==
This species is most closely related to the Amazon river dolphin (Inia geoffrensis), from which it is believed to have split about 2.08 million years (Ma) ago, on the basis of mitochondrial DNA sequence comparisons. The time of divergence corresponds to the time the Amazon and Araguaia-Tocantins river basins became separated, implying vicariant speciation. Major rapids in the lower Tocantins River (into which the Araguaia River flows) are thought to have contributed to isolating the two species, as the Pará River (into which the Tocantins flows) connects with the Amazon River.

- non-South Asian<br />river dolphins
  - South<br /> American
    - Inia
      - - - Inia araguaiaensis (Araguaian river dolphin)
        - - Inia geoffrensis (Amazon river dolphin)
      - - Inia boliviensis (Bolivian river dolphin)
    - Pontoporia blainvillei (La Plata dolphin)
  - †Lipotes vexillifer (baiji or Yangtse river dolphin)

The estimated times of divergence with I. boliviensis, P. blainvillei and L. vexillifer are 2.9, 12.0 and 16.2 Ma ago, respectively.

== Conservation issues ==
The total population of the species is estimated to be of the order of 600 to 1500 individuals, and genetic diversity is limited. The ecology of its habitat has been adversely affected by agricultural, ranching and industrial activities, as well as by the use of dams for hydroelectric power. The inhabited section of the Araguaia River probably extends over about 1,500 km (930 mi) out of a total length of 2,110 km (1,310 mi). The Tocantins River habitat is fragmented by six hydroelectric dams, so the population there is at particular risk. The authors of the discovery paper regard its probable eventual IUCN status to be Vulnerable or worse.

The largest number of individuals of the new species is likely to occur in and around Cantão State Park, which contains most of the lakes in the Araguaia basin. However, commercial fishermen around the park have been killing them because they sometimes steal fish from nets. Shooting is common, but around protected areas like Cantão, where the sound of a gun might attract park rangers, some fishermen have taken to putting out poisoned bait for dolphins. The southernmost population of the species is a small group of isolated individuals in the Tocantins river above the Serra da Mesa dam.

== See also ==
- List of cetaceans
