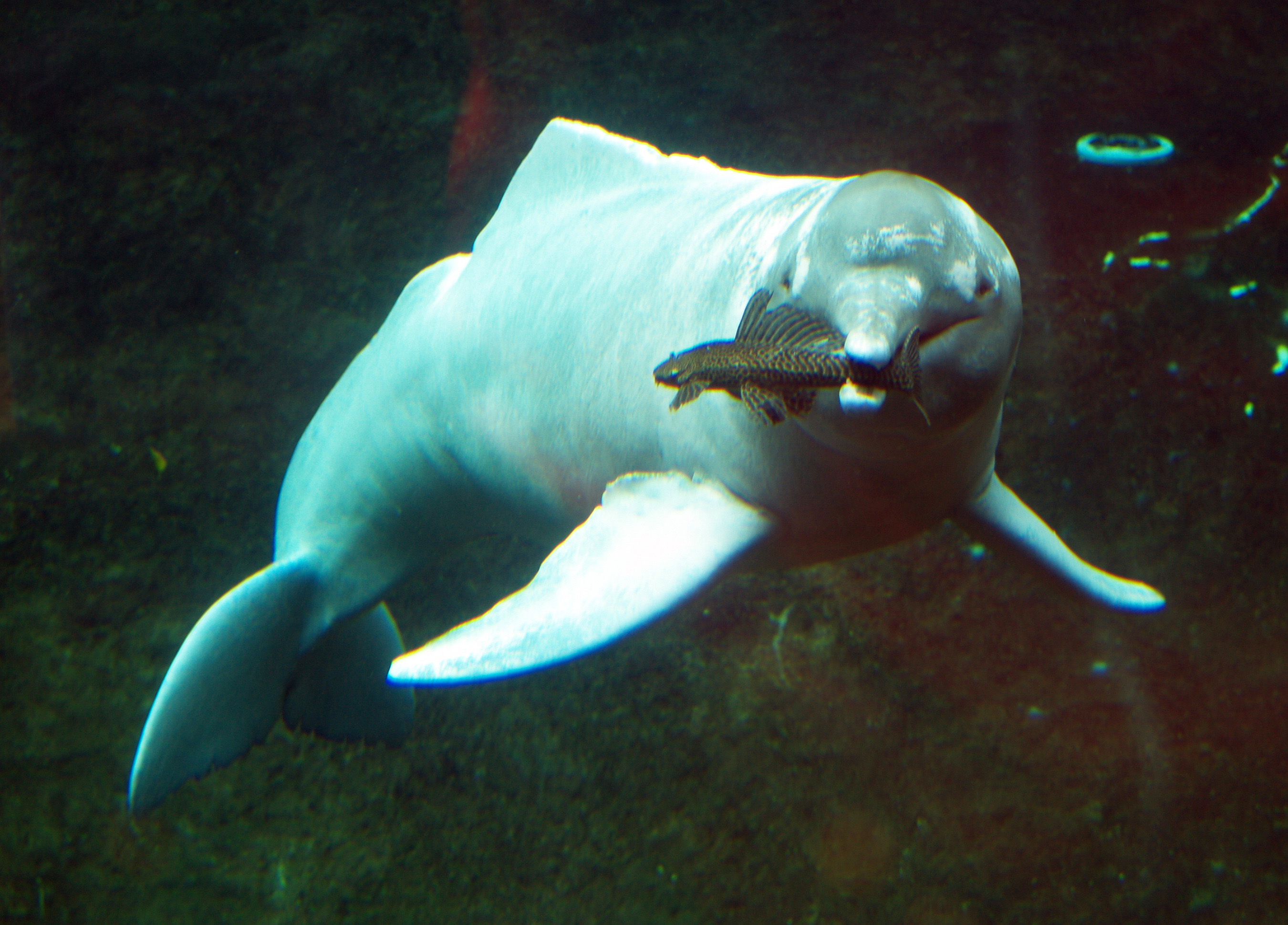
- An Amazon river dolphin at the Duisburg Zoo.
- Size compared to an average human

Scientific classification
- Kingdom: Animalia
- Phylum: Chordata
- Class: Mammalia
- Order: Artiodactyla
- Infraorder: Cetacea
- Family: Iniidae
- Genus: Inia d'Orbigny, 1834

Type species
- Inia boliviensis d'Orbigny, 1834

Species
- See text
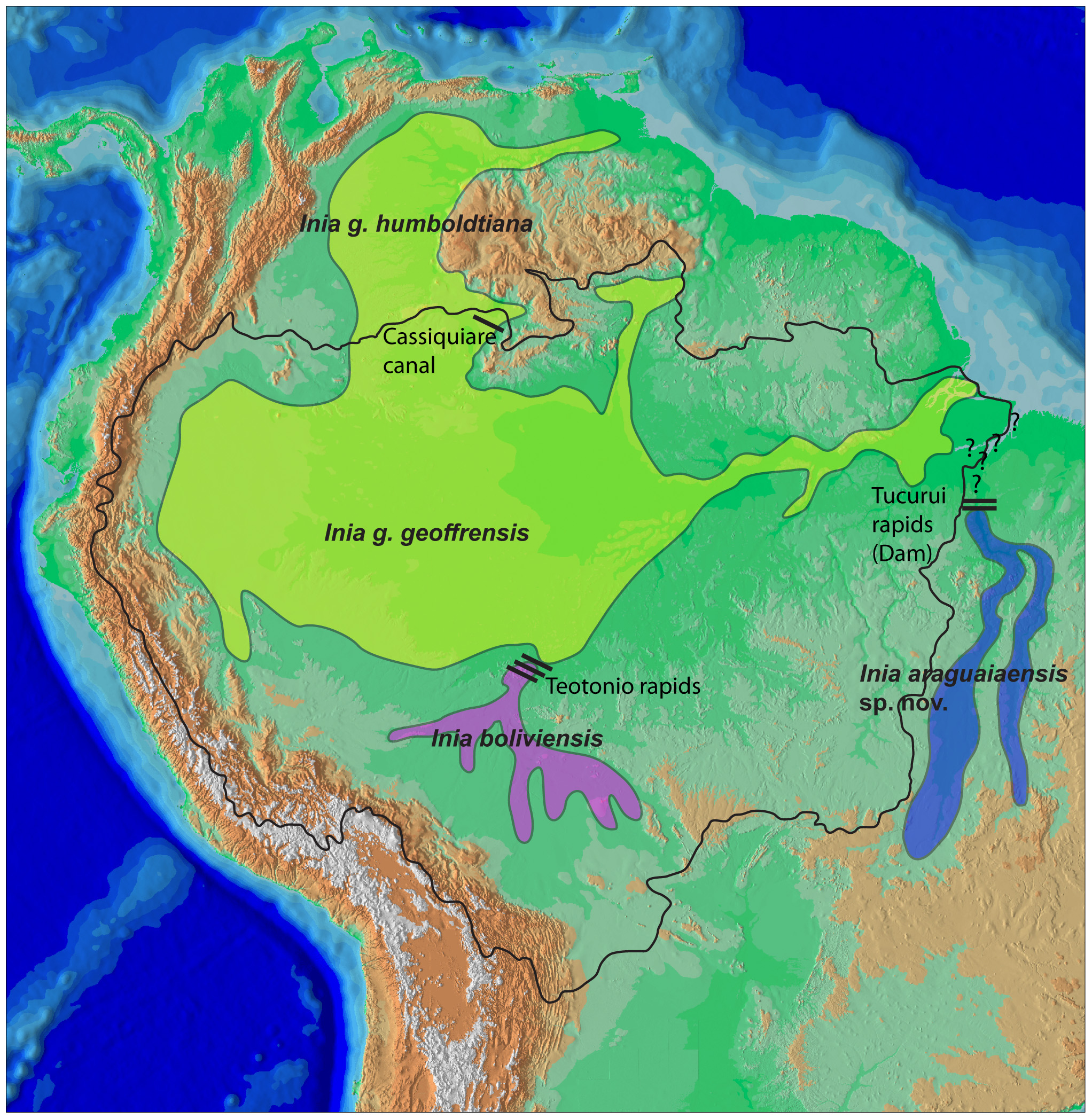
- Inia spp. ranges. I. araguaiaensis, I. geoffrensis and I. boliviensis are blue, light green and purple, respectively. I. humboldtiana is grouped with geoffrensis.

= Inia =

Genus of dolphins

Inia is a genus of river dolphins from South America, containing one to four species.

== Taxonomy ==
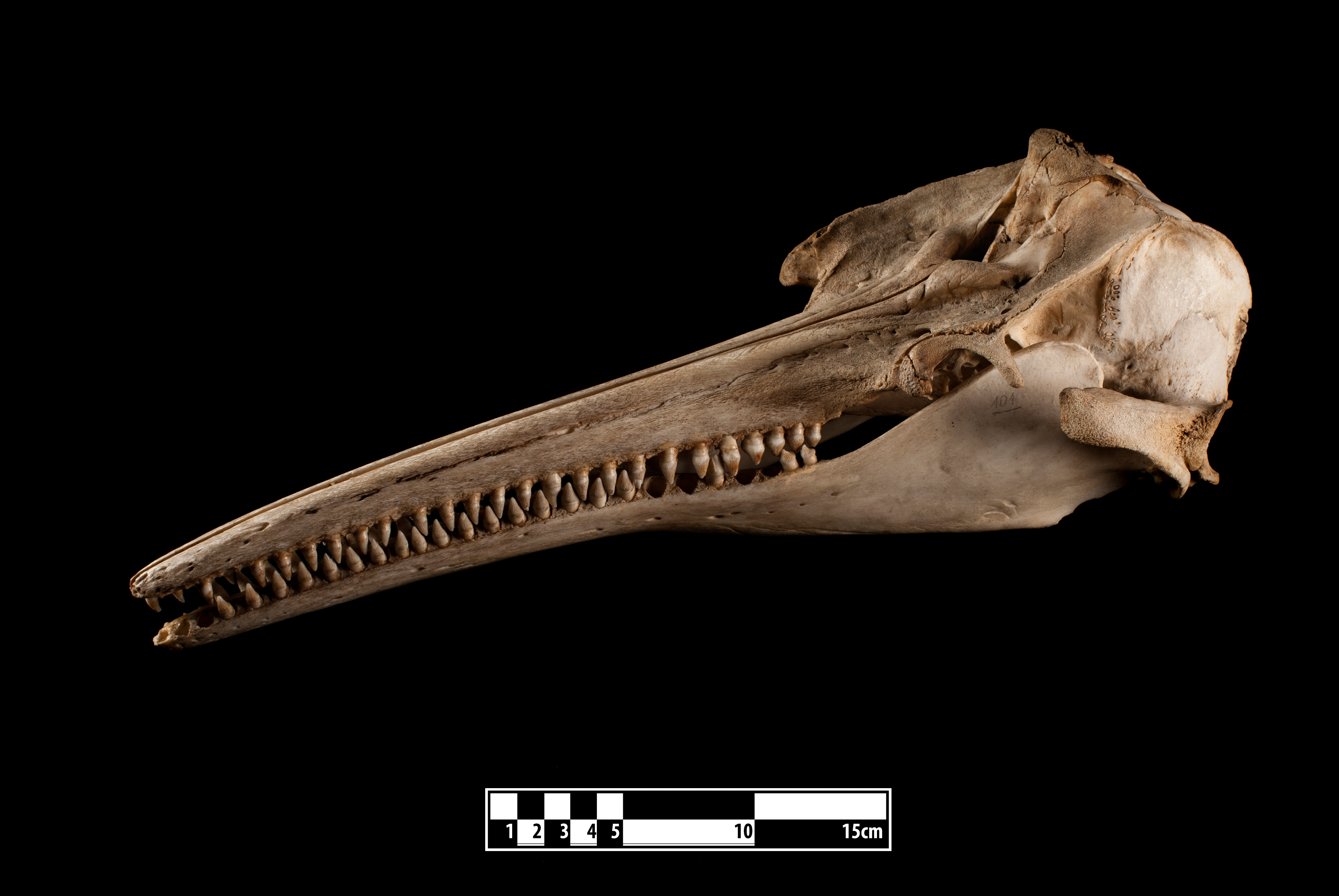
Inia spp. skull

The genus was described by Alcide d'Orbigny in 1834 when Delphinus geoffrensis, described by Henri Marie Ducrotay de Blainville in 1817, was recognized to be a unique taxon. D'Orbigny also described Inia boliviensis as type species of the genus. A 1998 classification listed a single species, Inia geoffrensis, in the genus Inia, with three recognized subspecies. Most of the scientific community accepted this single species classification, as does the IUCN. As of 2016 the Committee on Taxonomy of the Society for Marine Mammalogy considers the genus Inia to contain one species with only two subspecies: the Bolivian (I. g. boliviensis) and the Amazon (I. g. geoffrensis) subspecies. In 2014, the population in the Araguaia-Tocantins basin was proposed to define an additional species, Inia araguaiaensis, but this remains debated. The American Society of Mammalogists recognizes the highest number of species at four, although this is only tentative, pending further studies which could either confirm or deny the classification.

American Society of Mammalogists Classification

Genus Inia

- Species Inia araguaiaensis – Araguaian river dolphin
- Species Inia boliviensis – Bolivian river dolphin
- Species Inia geoffrensis – Amazon river dolphin
- Species Inia humboldtiana – Orinoco river dolphin

IUCN Classification

Genus Inia

- Species Inia geoffrensis – Amazon river dolphin
  - Amazon Subspecies I. g. geoffrensis
  - Bolivian Subspecies I. g. boliviensis
  - Orinoco Subspecies I. g. humboldtiana

Society For Marine Mammalogy Classification

- Genus Inia
  - Species Inia geoffrensis – Amazon river dolphin
    - Amazon Subspecies I. g. geoffrensis
    - Bolivian Subspecies I. g. boliviensis
