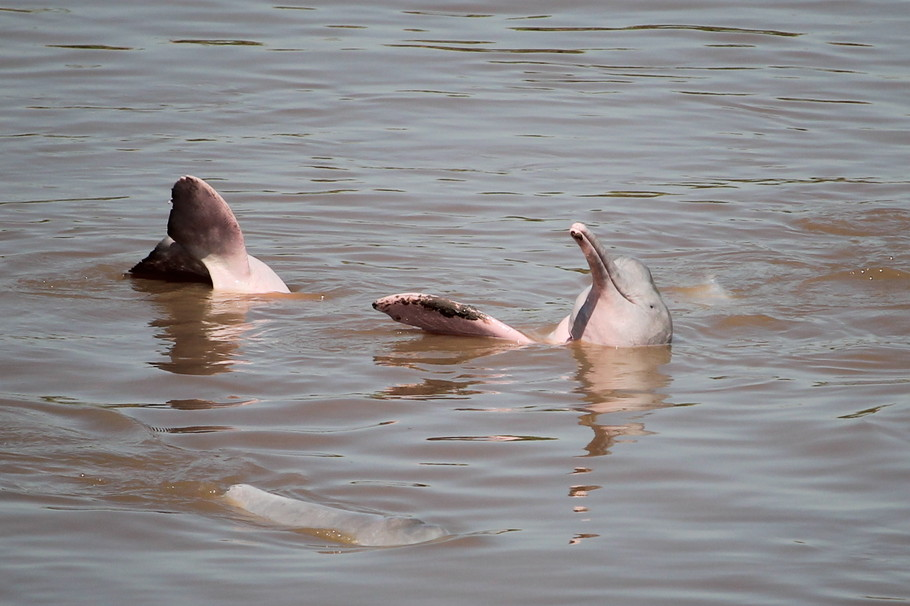

Conservation status
- CITES Appendix II (CITES)

Scientific classification
- Kingdom: Animalia
- Phylum: Chordata
- Class: Mammalia
- Order: Artiodactyla
- Infraorder: Cetacea
- Family: Iniidae
- Genus: Inia
- Species: I. boliviensis

Binomial name
- Inia boliviensis d'Orbigny, 1834

= Bolivian river dolphin =

Subspecies of Amazon river dolphin

The Bolivian river dolphin is a species (Inia boliviensis) or subspecies (Inia geoffrensis boliviensis) of freshwater dolphin found in upstream areas of the Amazon Basin.

== Taxonomy ==
Bolivian river dolphins were discovered by the Western world in 1832 by French researcher Alcide d'Orbigny. The Bolivian river dolphin was briefly thought to be a subspecies (as I. geoffrensis boliviensis) of the Amazonian river dolphin, Inia geoffrensis, but differences in body structure and the isolation of the Bolivian river dolphin led to it being classified as its own species in 2012. In a study conducted in 2015, it was also noted that any gene flow between I. geoffrensis (downstream) and I. boliviensis (upstream) would be a one way path flowing from upstream to downstream due to the Teotônio waterfall between them. Despite any gene flow, these populations would also remain morphologically different from each other due to the differences in the environment in which they reside. Differences in seasonal water depth and speed would result in morphologically different species. In terms of research that has been conducted or could be conducted, the population size for these freshwater dolphins is incredibly small, making large sample sizes for scientific studies hard to work with.

=== Species designation ===
Although older publications and some recent publications consider the I. g. boliviensis population as distinct species from Inia geoffrensis, much of the scientific community, including the IUCN, consider them to be a subspecies of Inia geoffrensis. Current classification, therefore, considers them a single species, Inia geoffrensis, in the genus Inia, with two recognized subspecies. As of 2016, the Committee on Taxonomy of the Society for Marine Mammalogy supports the designation of two subspecies. A recent study, with more comprehensive sampling of the Madeira system, including above and below the Teotonio Rapids (which were thought to obstruct gene flow), found that the Inia above the rapids did not possess unique mtDNA. As such the species level distinction once held was not supported by further sampling. Therefore, the Bolivian river dolphin is currently recognized as a subspecies.

In September 2012, Bolivian President Evo Morales enacted a law to protect the dolphin and declared it a national treasure.

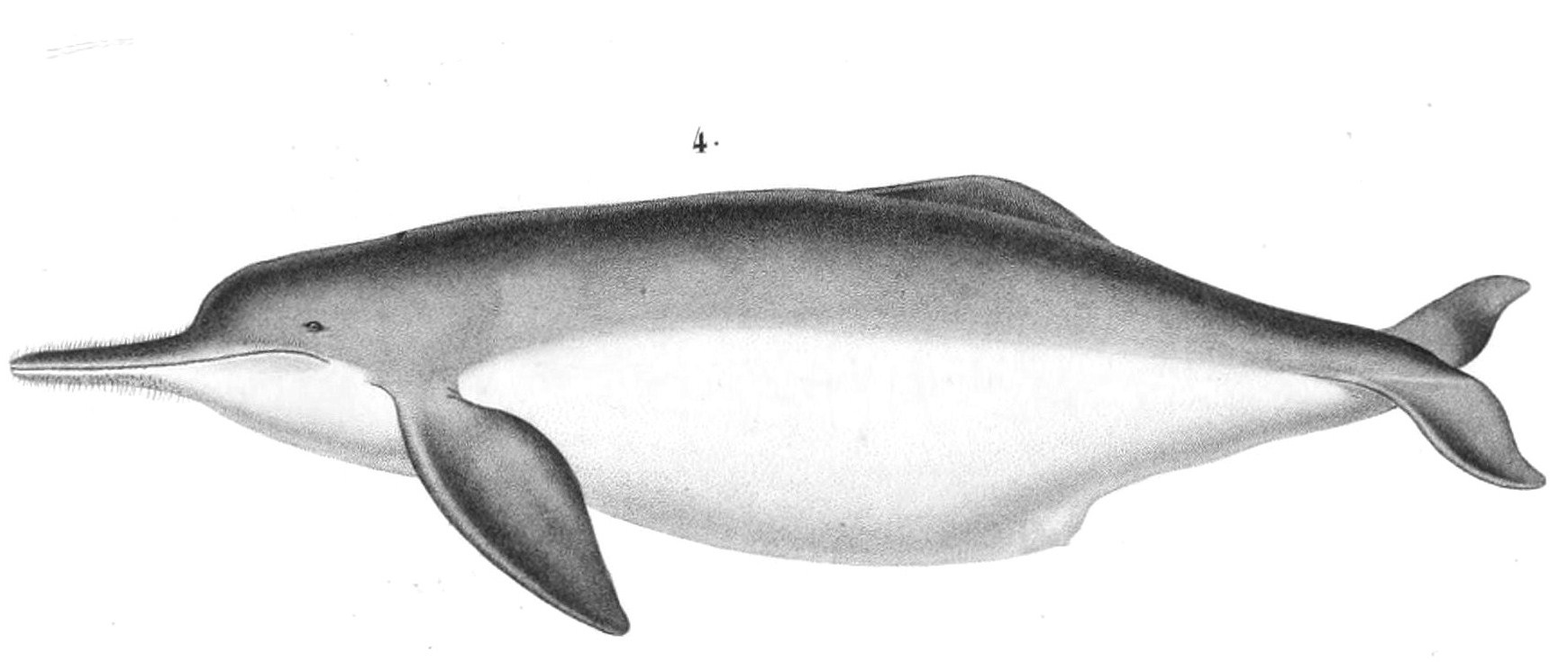
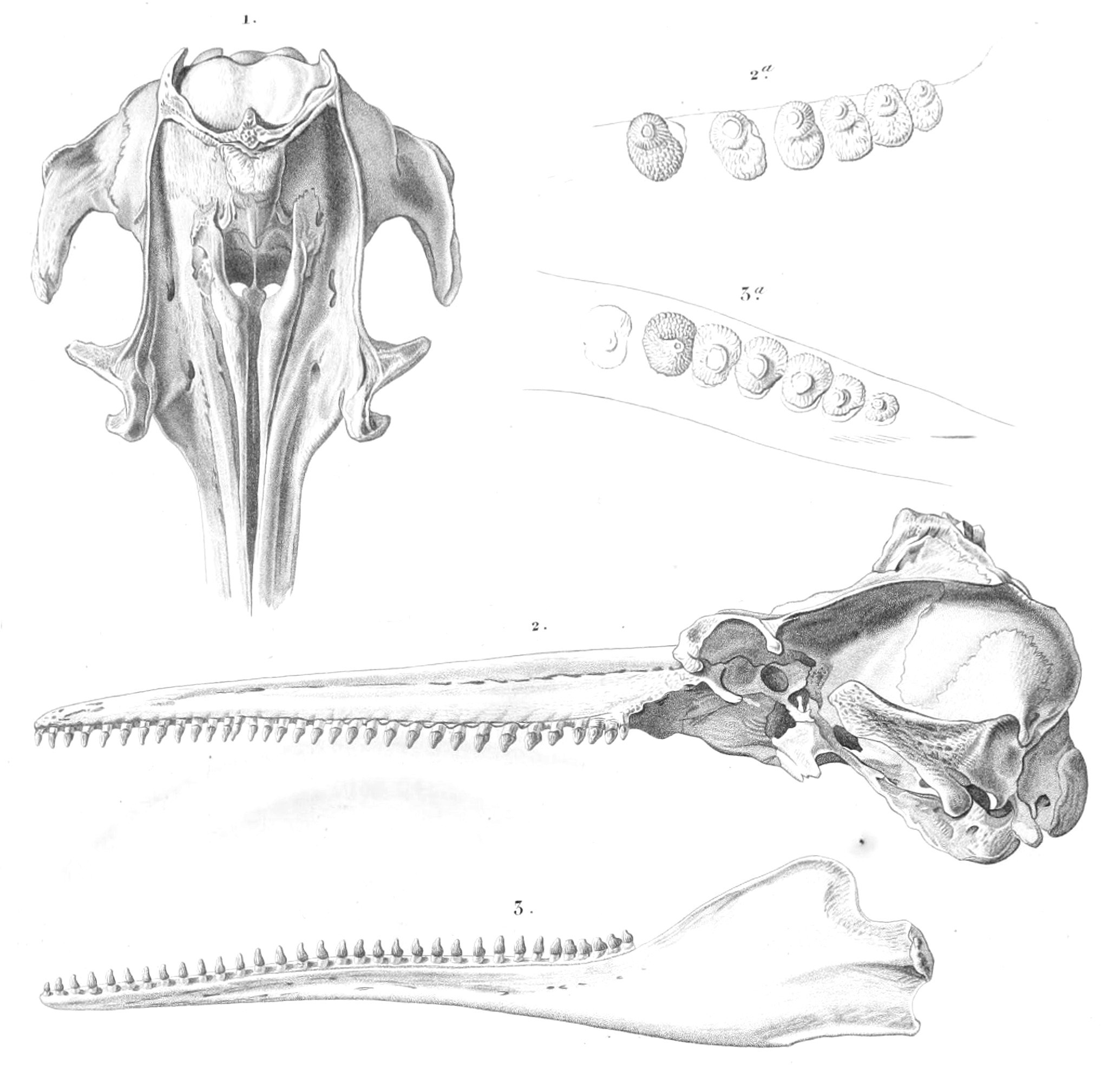
Drawings of the Bolivian river dolphin by d'Orbigny 1847

French naturalist and palaeontologist Alcide Dessalines d'Orbigny explored South America from 1826 to 1833, including a stay in Bolivia from 1831 to 1833. He returned to France in 1834 and started to describe his scientific explorations, including the new Bolivian cetacean species "Inia boliviensis". In 1847, he and Paul Gervais compared it to "Delphinius geoffrensis" (=Amazon river dolphin, Inia geoffrensis), which had been described from a stuffed specimen in Lisbon, and the two were considered synonyms for more than a century. In 1973, however, a fresh study concluded that the specimens from Bolivia had more teeth than the specimens from elsewhere and that the rapids and water falls of the Madeira River acted as a barrier, effectively isolating the Bolivian population. The Bolivian river dolphin was therefore made a subspecies, Inia geoffrensis boliviensis. Morphological studies later in the 1970s added to the differences between the populations and the specific status Inia boliviensis was restored. There is, however, still no consensus on the taxonomic status of the Bolivian population (or that of the Orinoco River population, "I. g. humboldtiana").

== Description ==
The Bolivian river dolphin, or Inia boliviensis, is one of four freshwater river dolphin species in South America. Locally known as bufeos, it is found in some rivers in the Upper Madeira Basin of the Bolivian Amazon. The Bolivian river dolphins are separated from the Amazonian River Dolphins by a series of rapids and falls. The pink river dolphin is the largest freshwater dolphin in the world. It can reach up to 2.8 metres (9.2 ft) long and weigh as much as 180 kilograms (400 lb). Compared to its cousin, the Amazonian river dolphin (Inia geoffrensis), the Bolivian river dolphin has more teeth, a smaller skull, and a longer body.

== Threats ==
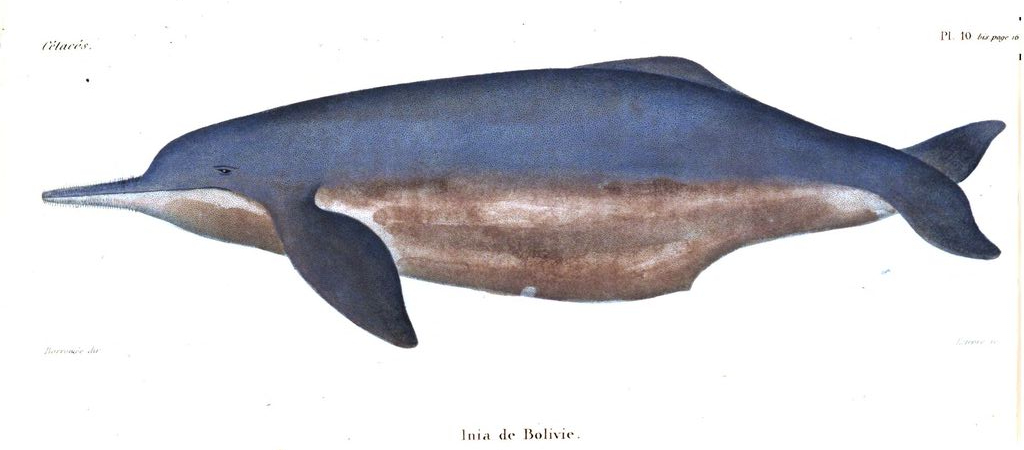
The Inia boliviensis is bigger than its Amazon counterpart, the Inia geoffrensis.

The Amazon river dolphin, Inia geoffrensis, is classified as endangered by the IUCN Red List. The Bolivian river dolphin faces a multitude of threats. Overfishing, deforestation, and hydroelectric construction are all major factors in the current population decline. Fisheries also pose a threat to the dolphins, for fishermen might see the dolphins as competition for fish. Deceased dolphins have been noted to have wounds from nets, as well as cuts and mutilation most likely caused by humans. River dolphins are some of the most at-risk marine animals worldwide due to their limited habitats and threats from land.

== Conservation ==
Since the construction of the two hydroelectric dams in the segment of river where Bolivian river dolphins are found in 2008, the movement of the river has been blocked into two reservoirs of about 300 and 350 km^{2}. Each dam is equipped with mechanisms to promote fish transportation between the reservoirs to prevent the populations from being evolutionarily cut off, however, it is unlikely the Bolivian river dolphins will use these transports. The upstream and downstream populations of I. boliviensis have been cut off by the design of the transport, as they can sustain only short bursts of swimming through high velocity water, and the transports are shallow and narrow with high velocity water, providing an effective barrier between populations. The dams can also cause a change to the fish community structure, and therefore altering the diet of Bolivian river dolphins.

Conservation efforts to prevent further population decline of freshwater dolphins can begin with protecting areas from human influence. Limiting or removing boat traffic, creating better marine animal passageways through dams, and working with fisheries to live alongside wildlife instead of fighting against it are all important steps. Preserving habitats is important for species richness, genetic diversity, and ecosystem complexity.

== Behavior ==
Bolivian river dolphins are elusive and difficult to observe, as they typically swim below the surface.

In August 2021, a research team observed two sexually aroused juvenile male dolphins near the Tijamuchi River playing with a Beni anaconda (Eunectes beniensis).

Necropsies have shown the Bolivian river dolphin diet includes a variety of different species of fish, as well as crabs. In the necropsy of a juvenile dolphin, multiple different species of fish from at least 4 different families were found in its stomach contents. It is also worth noting that none of the species present in this particular juvenile's stomach were target species for fisheries.

The dolphins are difficult to observe in the murky river water. However, in April 2022, three ecologists published photographs of Bolivian river dolphins play with a large (presumably dead) Beni Anaconda snake.

== See also ==
- River dolphins
- List of cetacean species
