= Cetaceans of the Caribbean =

Cetaceans (or Cetacea, from the ancient Greek κῆτος, meaning 'sea monster') form an infra-order of marine mammals. In 2020 some 86 species of cetaceans had been identified worldwide. Among these species, at least 35 have been sighted in the wider Caribbean region with very widespread distribution and density variations between areas. Caribbean waters are a preferred breeding site for several species of mysticeti, who live further north the rest of the year. The tucuxi and the boto live at the southern periphery of the Caribbean region in the freshwaters of the Amazon River and surrounding drainage basins.

Integration of cetaceans into public policies is as variable as are cetacean sightings, with several large sanctuaries specifically devoted to cetaceans and a number of countries in which the practice of cetacean hunting remains widespread.

In addition to cetaceans, the Caribbean is home to other marine mammals, including two species of pinniped: one present at its extralimital distributional range (hooded seal) the other an aquarium escapee (California sea lion). The only indigenous species of seal is the Caribbean monk seal believed to have become extinct in the middle of the 20th century. Most of the West Indian manatee populations are also found in the region, hybridised with the Amazonian manatee in the Guiana Shield area.

== Species ==
=== Mysticeti (baleen whales) ===
==== Balaenoptera ====
===== Fin whale (Balaenoptera physalus) =====
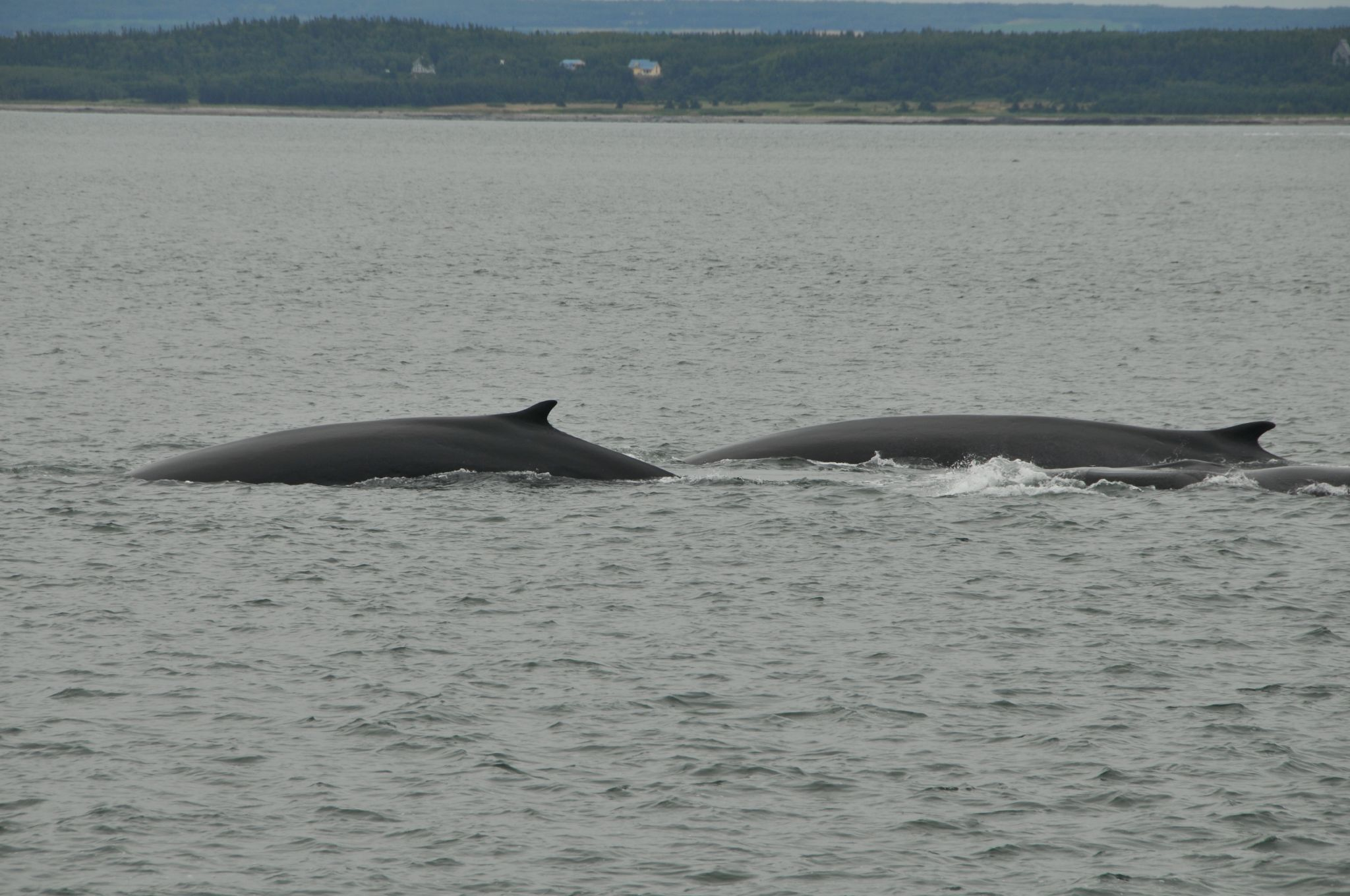
Fin whales in the Gulf of St. Lawrence, off the coast of Labrador

The fin whale is more prevalent in high-latitude regions than throughout the tropics. However, in the autumn, Northern Atlantic fin whale populations off the coast of Labrador appear to migrate to the Caribbean islands, passing through Bermuda

Live individuals have been observed off the coasts of Puerto Rico, Venezuela and Colombia. Stranded individuals have been found along the coast of Belize (in 1986) and along Mexico's Caribbean coastline (in 2018). However, they may have been confused with Bryde's whale.

===== Minke whale (Balaenoptera acutorostrata) =====
The common minke whale is the smallest rorqual in the world. However, like several other species in the same genus, it spends the summer feeding in high-latitude regions and migrates to its breeding grounds along the Caribbean island-arc and the mid-Atlantic area. It has been sighted from Florida to Dominica Although several strandings have been recorded in the Gulf of Mexico, no live individuals have been observed in this area

===== Antarctic minke whale (Balaenoptera bonaerensis) =====
Believed to be the same species as B.acurostrata until the 1990s, this species lives predominantly in the Antarctic Ocean and is considered endemic to the Southern Hemisphere. A stranded individual was sighted in 1998 in Suriname and another in 2013 in Louisiana. However, these rare observations are considered extralimital cases.

===== Blue whale (Balaenoptera musculus) =====
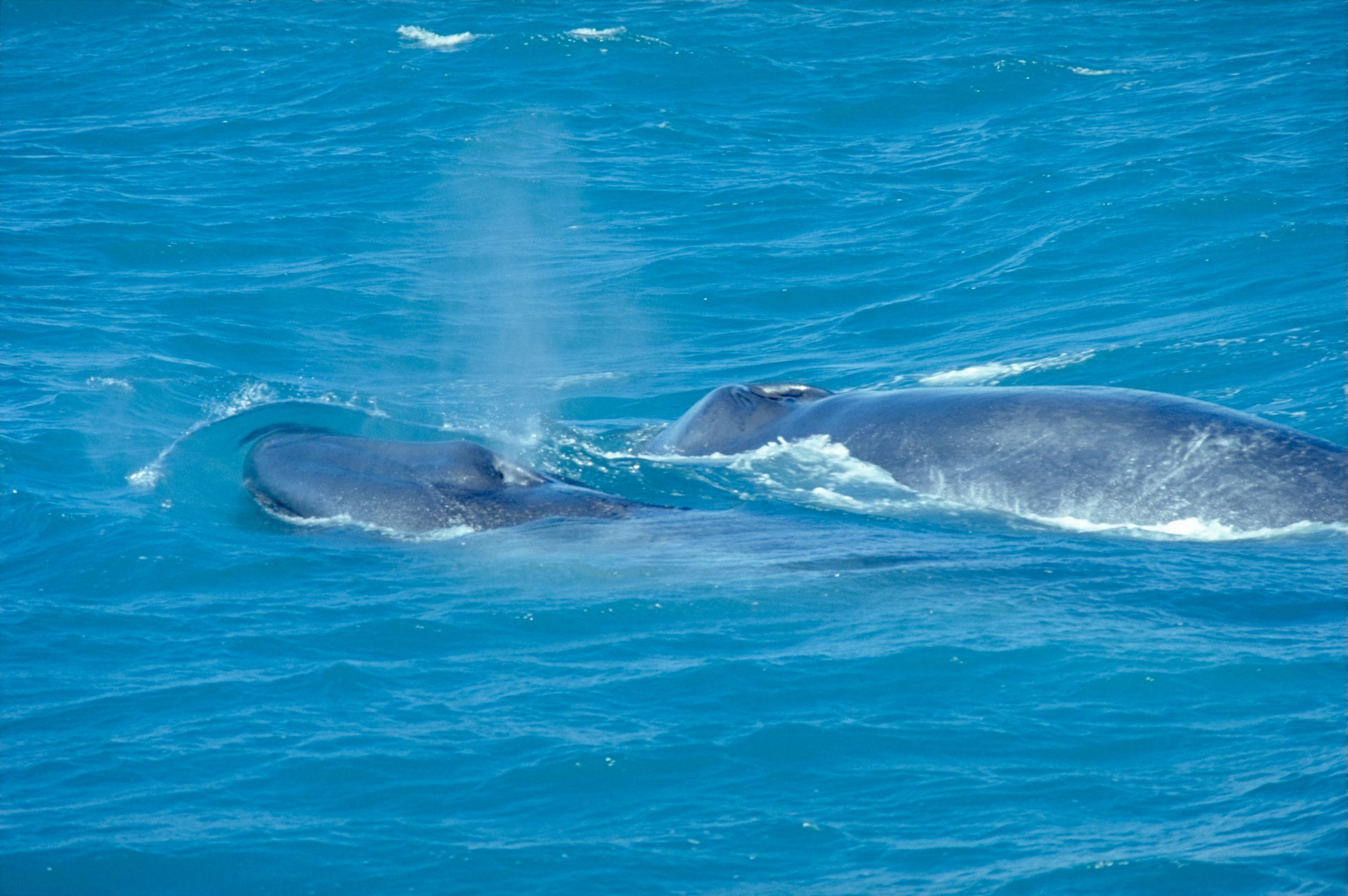
Blue whale with calf off the coast of Iceland

The blue whale is the largest living animal in the world in the present epoch. Its summer range extends from the east of Canada to Svalbard, and this range is potentially occupied by two separate groups. Like other rorquals, blue whales appear to migrate further south during the winter. However, little is known about their distribution at this time of the year. Although there have been a few sightings (stranded individuals in the Gulf of Mexico, Panama Canal in 1922) and acoustic recordings south of Bermuda, it would seem that these are rare events and that blue whale breeding areas are more likely to be located off the eastern coast of the United States.

===== Bryde's whale (Balaenoptera edeni) =====
Bryde's whale is a species found in all of the world's warm temperate and tropical waters. However, its classification remains ill-defined. In 2021, Balaenoptera ricei was defined as a new species distinct from other Atlantic Bryde's whale populations, and as specific to the Gulf of Mexico. Additional publications mention a potential division into Balaenoptera edeni edeni (smallest) and Balaenoptera (edeni) brydei species or sub-species for other Bryde's whale populations. Sightings have been recorded throughout the Caribbean, in particular off the coast of Venezuela, at Aruba as well as further north, all the way up to the Dominican Republic. However, attribution to one or other (sub)-species remains uncertain. Molecular evidence has, for example, enabled the unequivocal identification of the animal stranded in Aruba (mentioned above) as being related to Balaenoptera (edeni) brydei.

===== Rice's whale (Balaenoptera ricei) =====
This species was considered until 2021 as a population of rorquals specific to the north-east of the Gulf of Mexico, and not a migrating population. However, skeletal and genetic analyses have demonstrated that it is in fact a distinct species. This species has an estimated population of thirty individuals and is considered Critically Endangered.

===== Sei whale (Balaenoptera borealis) =====
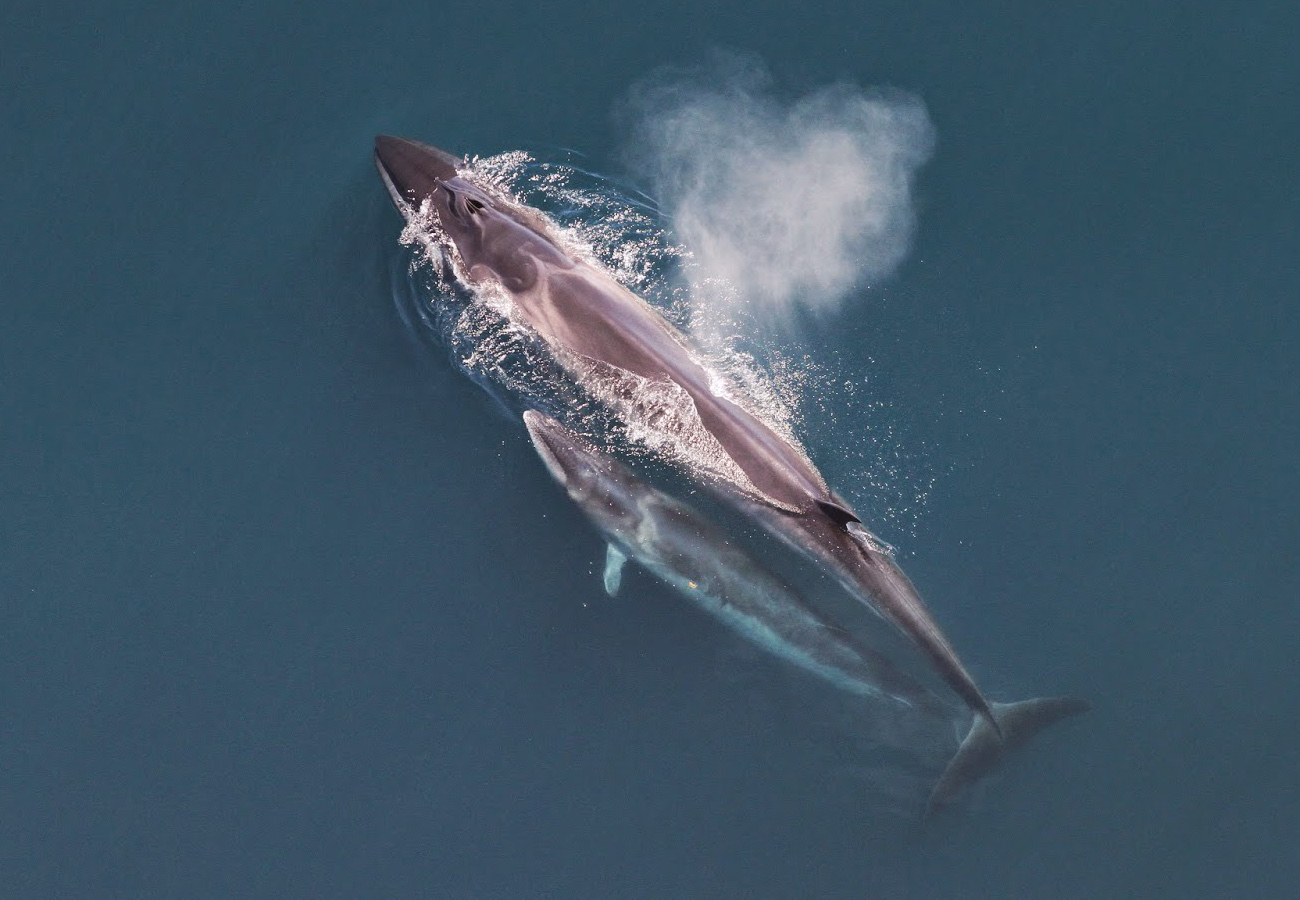
Female sei whale with calf

The sei whale is present worldwide, essentially in subtropical, subpolar and temperate areas. However, offshore, it is often hard to distinguish from Bryde's whale, with which it has long been confused. It is also sometimes hard to distinguish from the fin whale. In the summer, in the Atlantic Ocean, it is generally found in the vicinity of the Gulf of Maine. Little is known about its migration throughout the remainder of the year. It prefers deep waters and is known to avoid semi-enclosed seas and gulfs. However, stranded individuals have been observed in the Gulf of Mexico and off the coasts of the Greater Antilles Archipelago.

==== Megaptera ====
===== Humpback whale (Megaptera novaeangliae) =====
There are several populations of Atlantic humpback whales. In the Northern Atlantic, they reproduce in the Caribbean region, feeding throughout the summer in several areas of Northern America and Northern Europe (Gulf of Maine, Gulf of St. Lawrence, Labrador, Greenland, Iceland, Northern Norway). Breeding in the Caribbean's warm and shallow waters takes place in sites along the entire Caribbean island-arc, from Cuba to Venezuela, with a strong confirmed concentration off the coast of the Dominican Republic.

Since the beginning of the 21st century, a number of Southern Atlantic individuals have been observed migrating all the way to the Guiana Shield to reproduce. However, their habitual breeding area is further south, off the coast of Brazil. Contrary to Northern Hemisphere individuals, the pectoral fins of Southern Hemisphere individuals are much blacker, but their bellies are whiter.

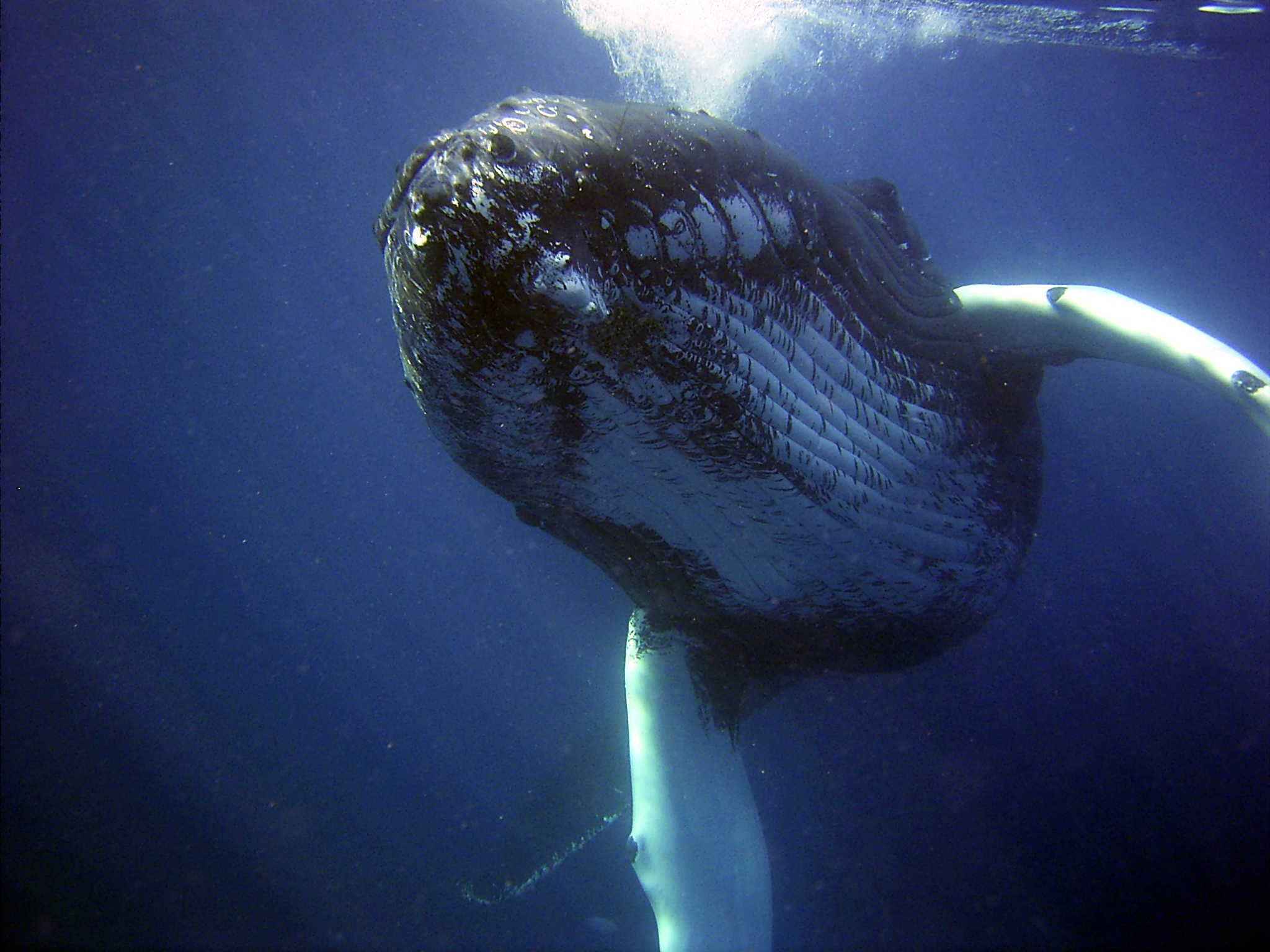
Humpback whale seen from below

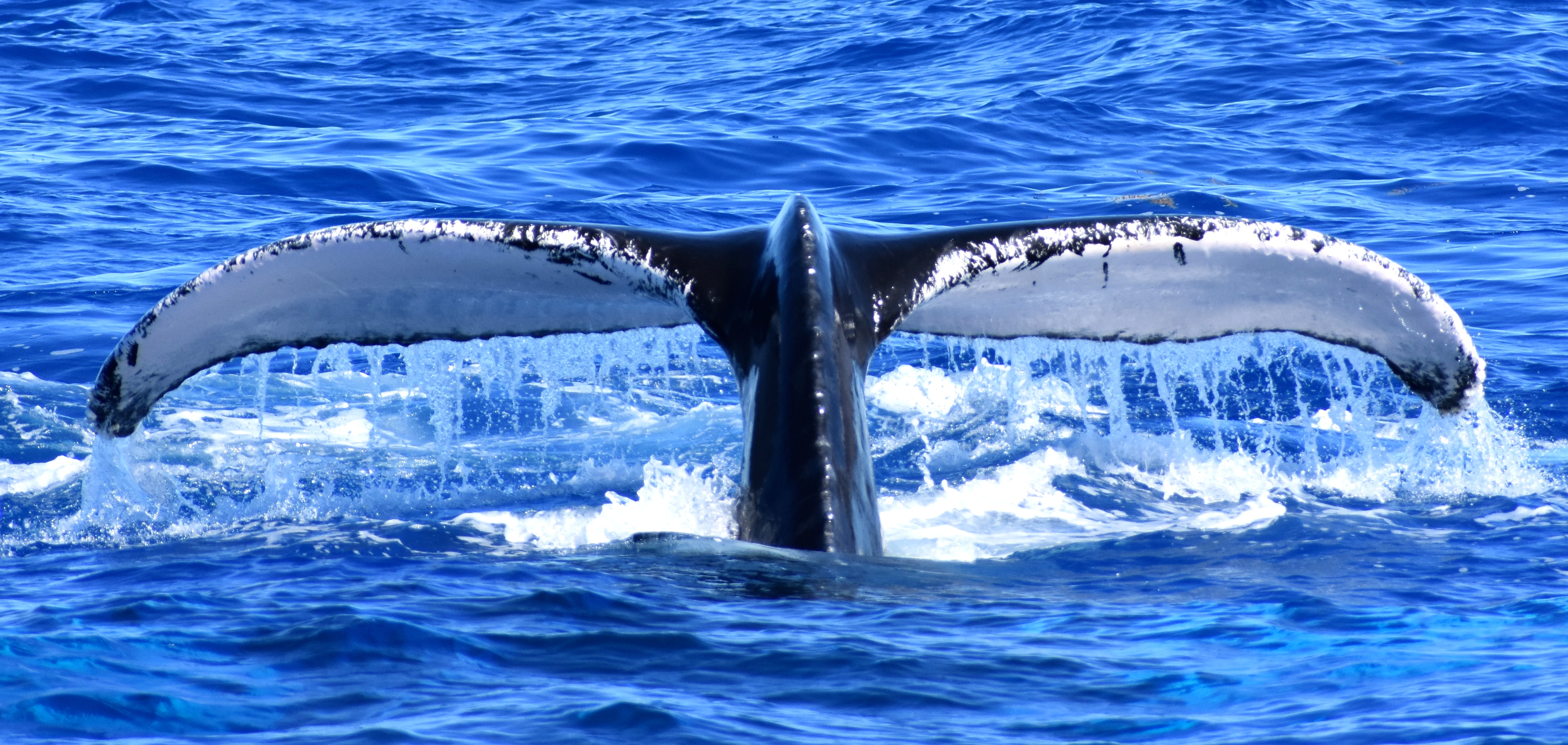
Flukes

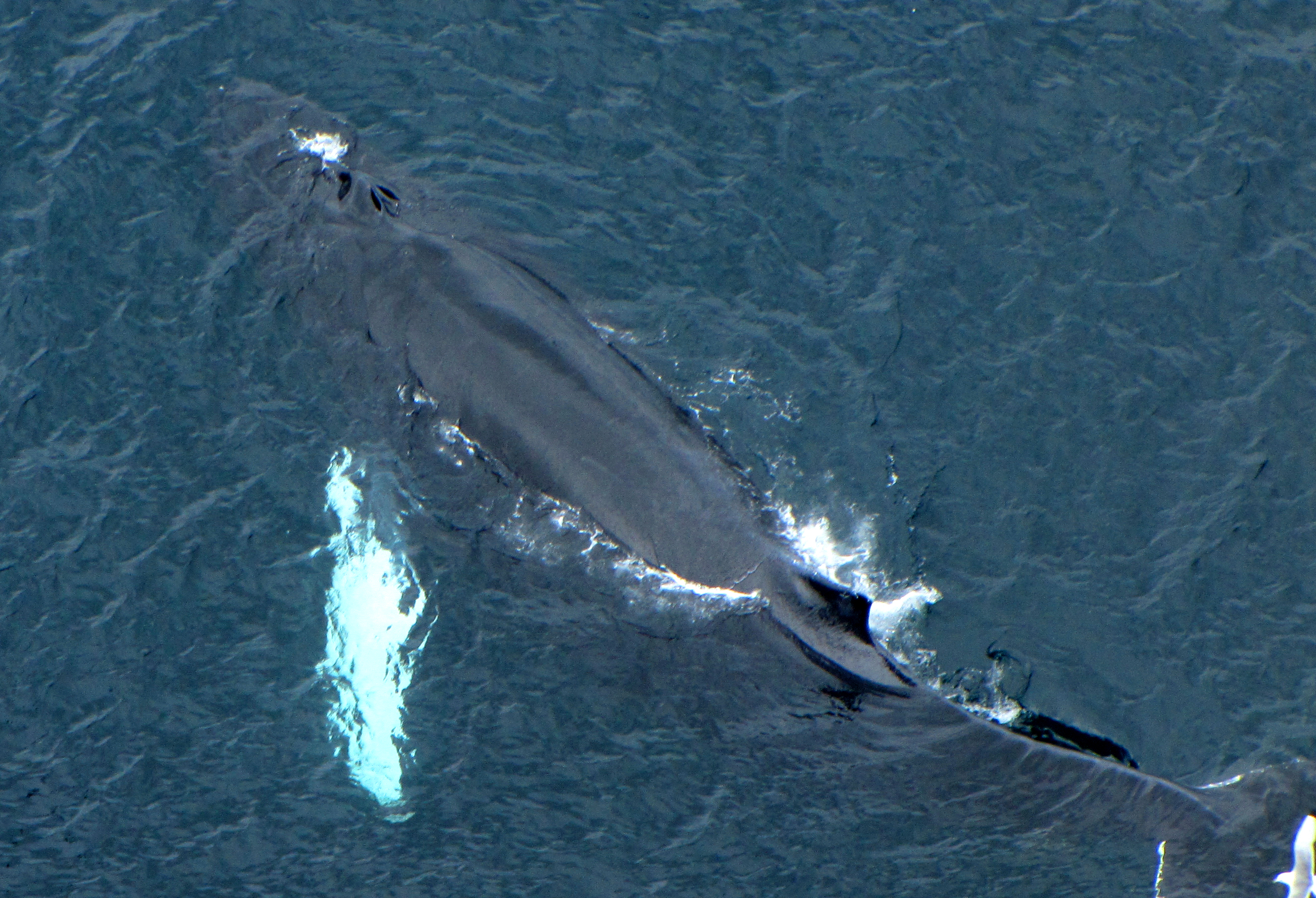
Seen from above

==== Eubalaena ====
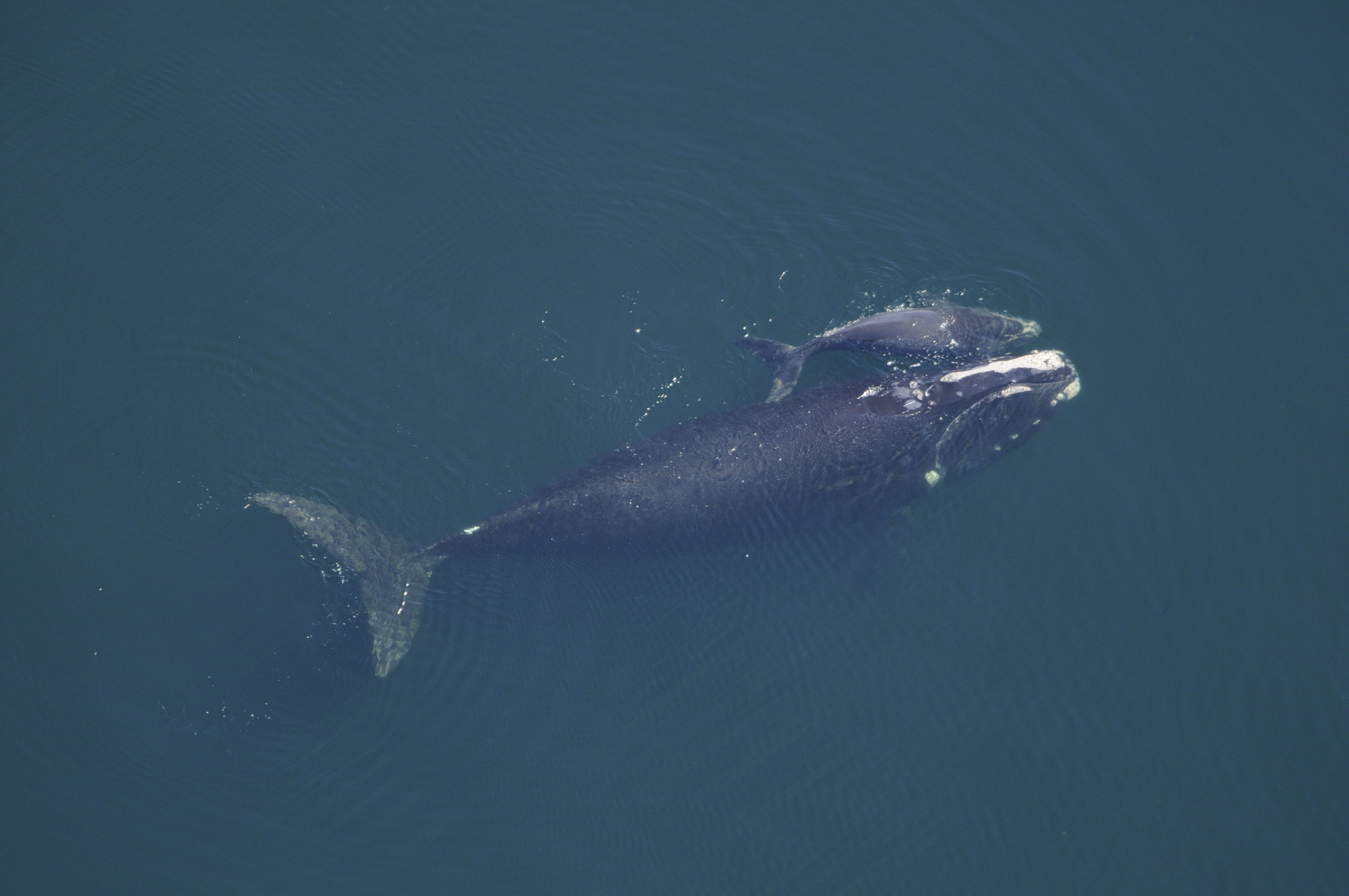
North Atlantic right whale with calf

===== North Atlantic right whale (Eubalaena glacialis) =====
This Critically Endangered species has a population of just over 350 individuals in the north-western Atlantic (a second, even scarcer, population is situated in the eastern Atlantic). Although the North Atlantic right whale spends most of its time outside of the Caribbean zone, it uses the eastern coastlines of Georgia and Florida, at the northern periphery of the Caribbean region, for its breeding sites. However, there have been several sightings in the Gulf of Mexico, indicating the potential historical presence of these animals further south.

=== Odontocetes (dolphins, killer whales and toothed whales) ===
==== Delphinidae (dolphins and killer whales) ====
===== Killer whale (Orcinus orca) =====
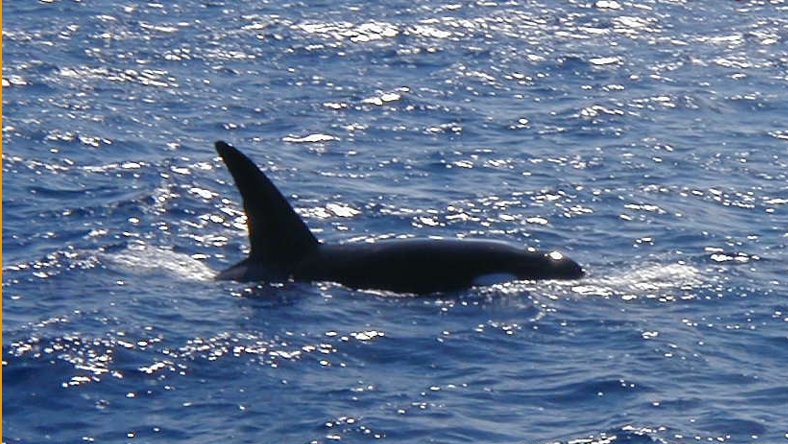
Killer whale south-east of Barbados (Cobblers Reef)

The killer whale is the largest member of the Delphinidae family, and its range includes all the world's oceans, although most of the research on the species has been conducted in polar or subpolar environments. However, killer whales are observed in the whole of the Caribbean region all year round, with a morphotype showing differences from all morphotypes described previously (Antarctic, Subantarctic, North-West Atlantic, or North-West Pacific).

===== Delphininae =====
====== Atlantic spotted dolphin (Stenella frontalis) ======
The Atlantic spotted dolphin is endemic to the Atlantic Ocean, and is observed between 50°N and 25/30°S. There are several populations in the Western Atlantic, with two morphotypes: a large form living on the continental slope at depths of less than 200 m, particularly in the Gulf of Mexico along the American coast, to the West of the Yucatán peninsula and a smaller form further offshore and along the islands.

====== Pantropical spotted dolphin (Stenella attenuata) ======
The pantropical spotted dolphin lives in the Atlantic, Pacific and Indian oceans, at greater depths than the Atlantic spotted dolphin.

The species is frequently observed in the oceanic environment in the Gulf of Mexico and is one of the most common cetacean species in tropical environments in general. It also appears to be very common in the south of the Lesser Antilles.

It has also been observed elsewhere in the Caribbean, for example Puerto Rico, Tobago, Dominican Republic, Venezuela and Colombia, generally in deep waters.

====== Spinner dolphin (Stenella longirostris) ======
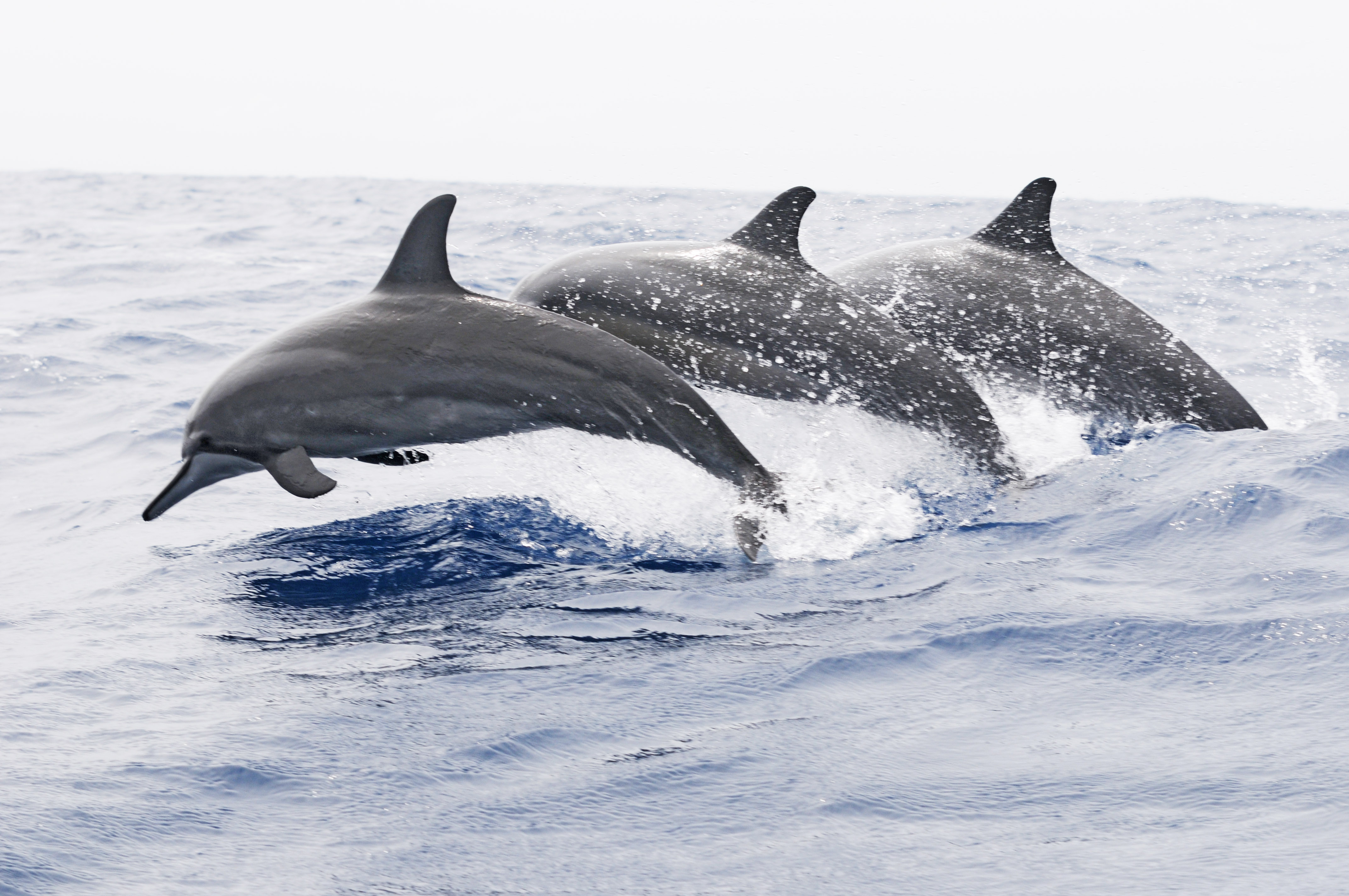
Spinner dolphin in Guadeloupe

The world distribution of the spinner dolphin is similar to that of the pantropical spotted dolphin.

In the North of the Gulf of Mexico, it is observed mainly to the east of the Mississippi, at depths greater than 200 m, all year round. The populations within the gulf (no doubt shared between United States, Mexico and Cuba) are assumed to be separate from those living in the Western Atlantic.

The spinner dolphin is observed along the entire Caribbean arc, although in variable numbers. Its preferred habitat appears to be around the islands, particularly in the coastal zone and around the seamounts. There is a major resident population in the Bahamas. They are hunted for food in Saint Vincent and the Grenadines.

====== Striped dolphin (Stenella coeruleoalba) ======
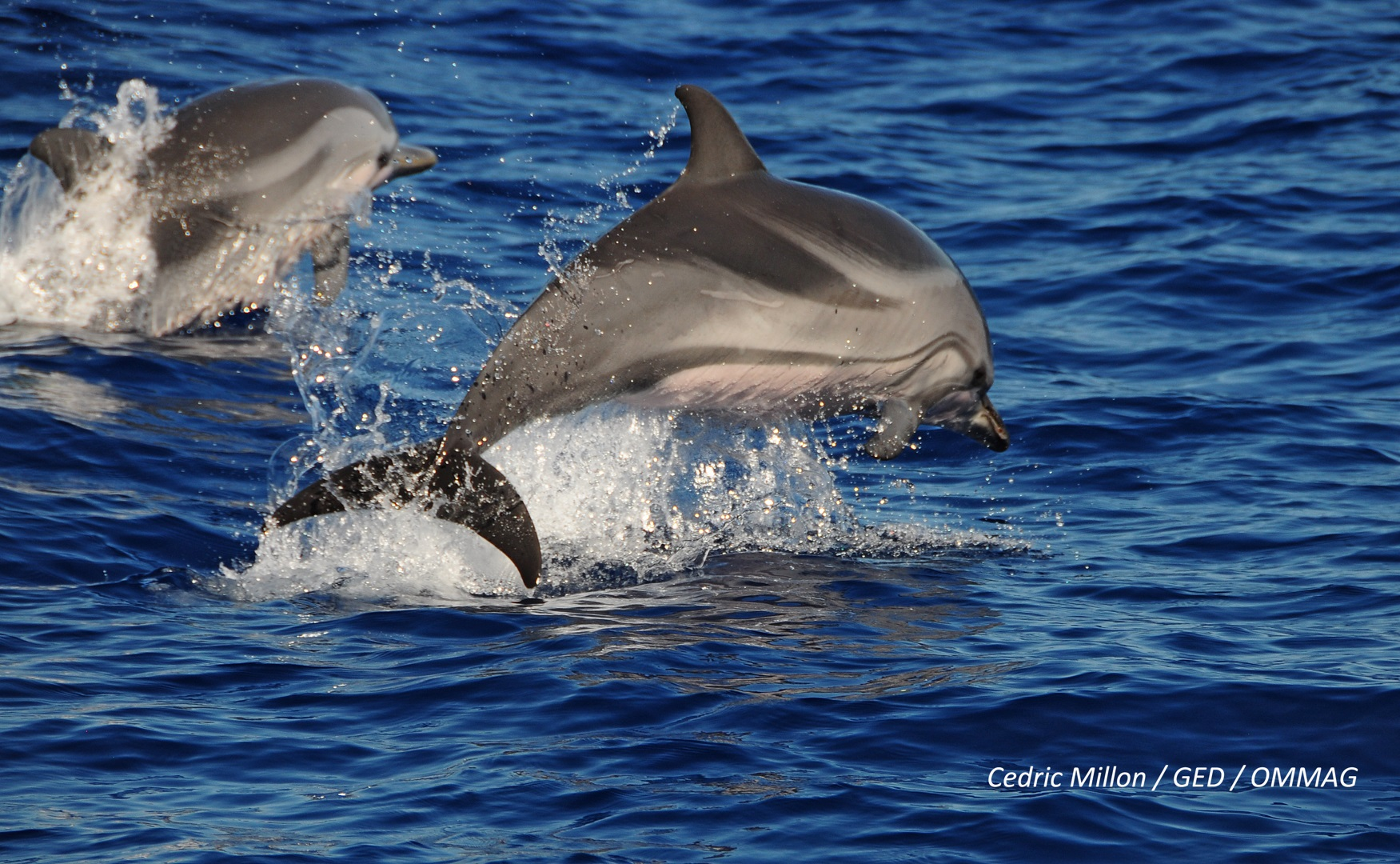
Striped dolphin

The striped dolphin is observed in most of the world's tropical and temperate waters.

In the North of the Gulf of Mexico, it is found at depths greater than 200 m and most often greater than 1000 m.

Sightings in the Caribbean are somewhat rare, limited to a few along the whole of the arc, in the Greater Antilles (United States Virgin Islands, Jamaica, Puerto Rico) and the Lesser Antilles.

====== Clymene dolphin (Stenella clymene) ======
Clymene dolphins are specific to the tropical and subtropical waters of the Atlantic Ocean, mainly between New Jersey and southern Brazil on the western side. In the North of the Gulf of Mexico, most observations have been recorded in the deepest waters.

The Clymene dolphin is a hybrid between the spinner dolphin and the striped dolphin.

====== Common dolphin (Delphinus delphis) ======
Since 2016, the common dolphin, previously divided into long-beaked common dolphin (Delphinus capensis) and short-beaked common dolphin (Delphinus delphis), is considered to be a single species. It is one of the cetaceans with the broadest distribution and highest abundance in all the habitats of all the main oceans.

However, it does not appear to have been observed in the Gulf of Mexico or in the Caribbean Sea, with the exception of the North of South America, along the coasts of Colombia and Venezuela.

====== Fraser's dolphin (Lagenodelphis hosei) ======
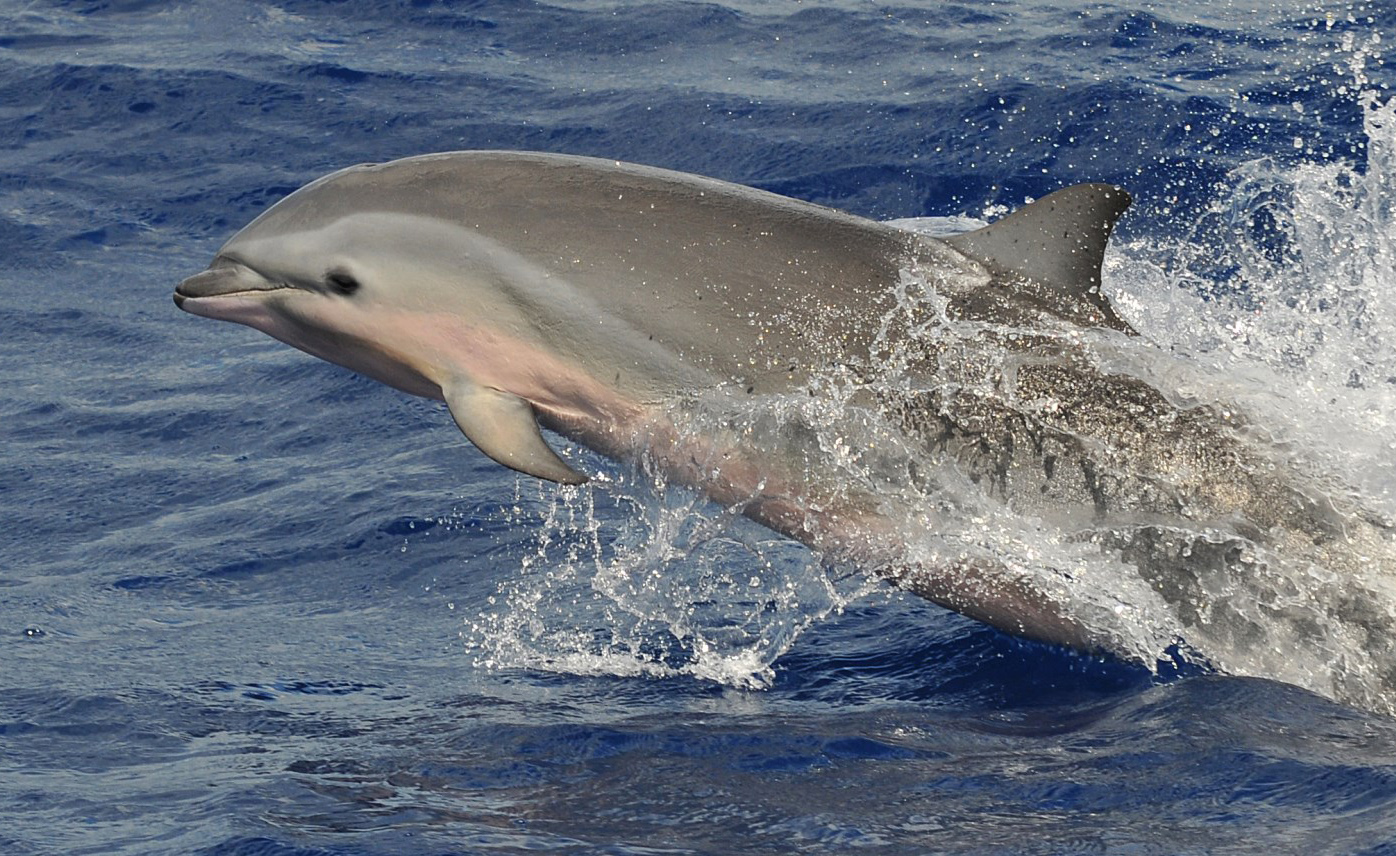
Fraser's Dolphin in Guadeloupe

Fraser's Dolphin is a pantropical species ranging between 30°S and 30°N, and is consequently observed in the Wider Caribbean Region. The populations are generally observed offshore in deep waters, but may be encountered close to the coasts around the oceanic islands, such as the Lesser Antilles.

Sightings in the Caribbean have been recorded in particular off Puerto Rico, Bonaire, and the French Antilles.

====== Bottlenose dolphin (Tursiops truncatus) ======
The Bottlenose dolphin is one of the most common cetacean species: its distribution is worldwide and it is observed in the three major ocean basins. Its local adaptation and its complex social structure have produced a number of clearly differentiated populations, with morphological variations that are sometimes marked, particularly in coastal waters.

In the Caribbean, for example, the NOAA identifies several populations managed independently in the Gulf of Mexico while around Puerto Rico a single ecotype could be identified, but comprising two distinct genetic lineages. The strong fidelity of these small populations to a single site, along with their genetic separation from the other populations, renders them more vulnerable to human pressures.

In addition to the local coastal populations, an oceanic form living further offshore is also observed in the Caribbean region. The genetic relationships between the various populations, whether coastal or oceanic, require more detailed studies to be correctly identified

The Bottlenose dolphin is the species most commonly kept in captivity in the Wider Caribbean Region. Several individuals of this species have been captured in Cuban waters and exported regionally and internationally.

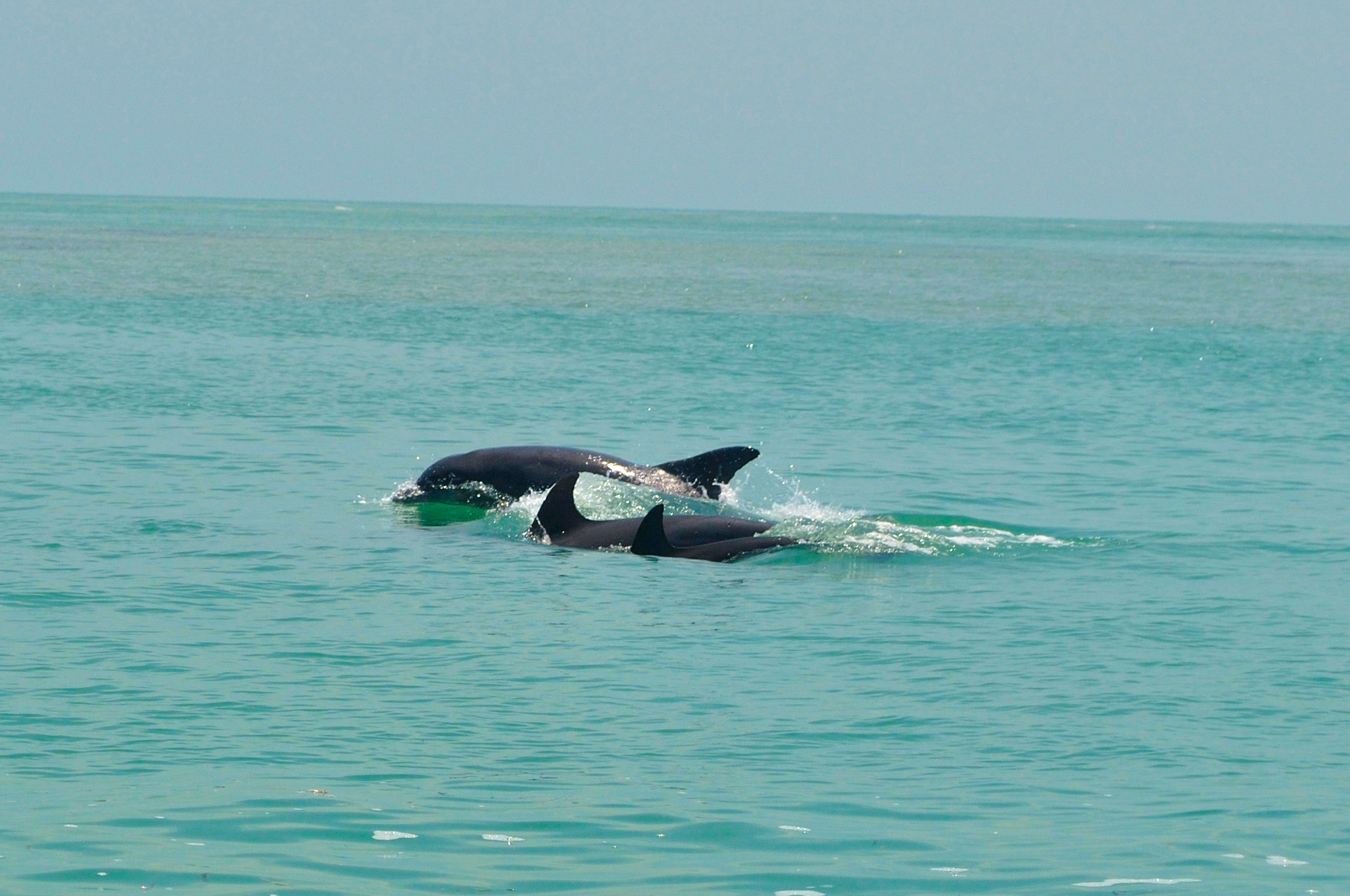
Bottlenose dolphins off the Yucatan Peninsula, Mexico

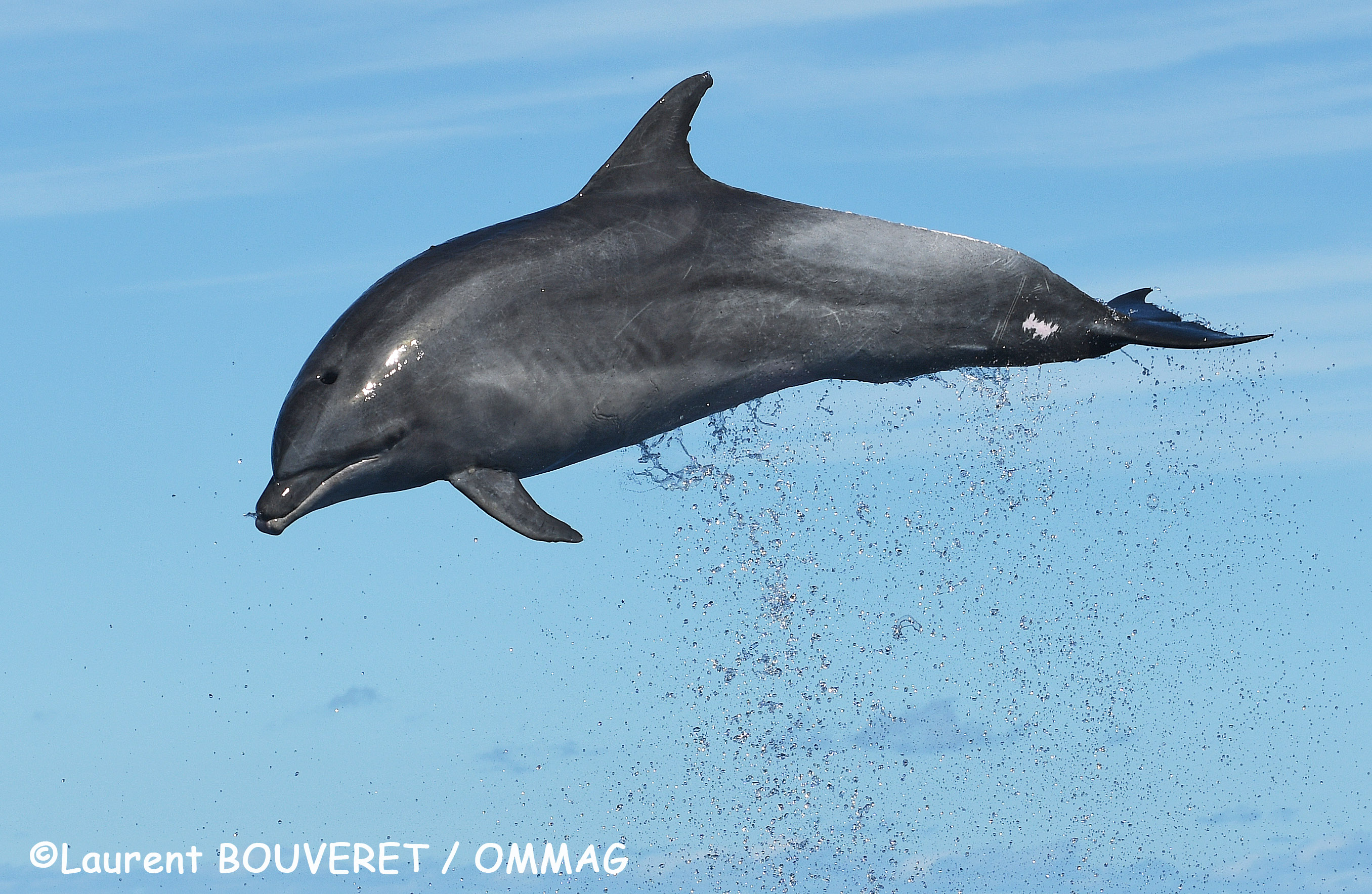
Bottlenose dolphin in Guadeloupe

====== Guiana dolphin (Sotalia guianensis) ======
The Guiana dolphin, also known as the estuarine dolphin or costero, is a predominantly coastal species, reported in the Caribbean region zone from Brazil to Honduras in the north.

It lives in groups in calm, shallow waters close to the coast and in estuaries, with a strong fidelity to its site.

There is an isolated population more than 500 km (310 mi) inland up the river Orinoco in Venezuela.

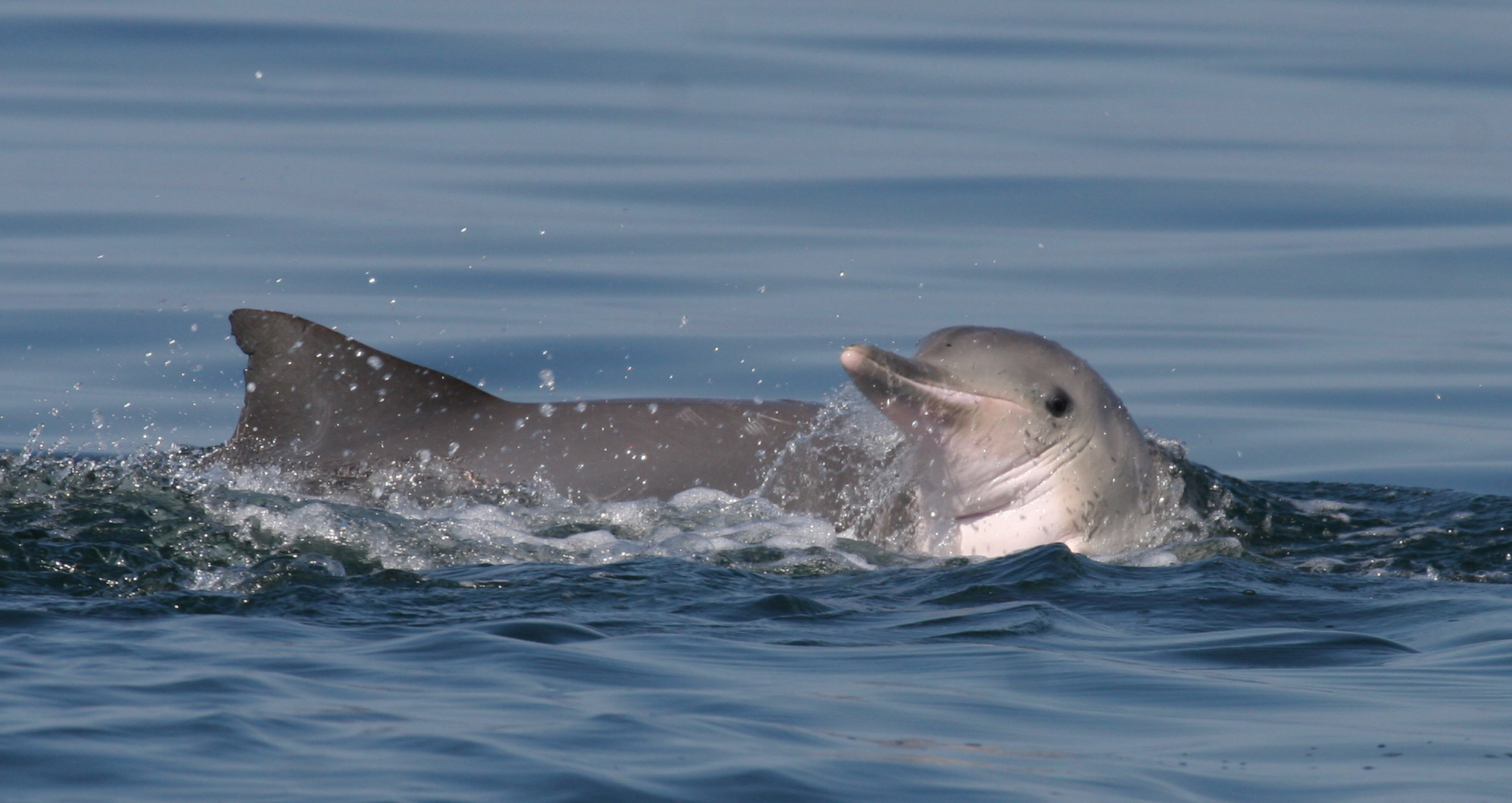
Guiana dolphins

====== Tucuxi (Sotalia fluviatilis) ======
In contrast, the dolphins living in the river basin of the Amazon have been recognised since the late 2010s as tucuxi, a separate species from Sotalia guianensis, and do not appear to venture out to sea. This means that it is not, strictly speaking, a marine mammal, unlike the Amazon river dolphin, from which it differs totally.

Whether the Lake Maracaibo population in Venezuela belongs to one or the other of the two Sotalia species remains to be determined.

===== Globicephalinae =====
====== False killer whale (Pseudorca crassidens) ======
The false killer whale has a cosmopolitan distribution, ranging over all the world's oceans between 50°N and 50°S, although the population density decreases substantially at latitudes above 15°. It is also observed in the Caribbean region, mainly around the Greater and Lesser Antilles and occasionally in the Western Caribbean. The species is also seen in the North of the Gulf of Mexico, mainly in the eastern part.

====== Rough-toothed dolphin (Steno bredanensis) ======
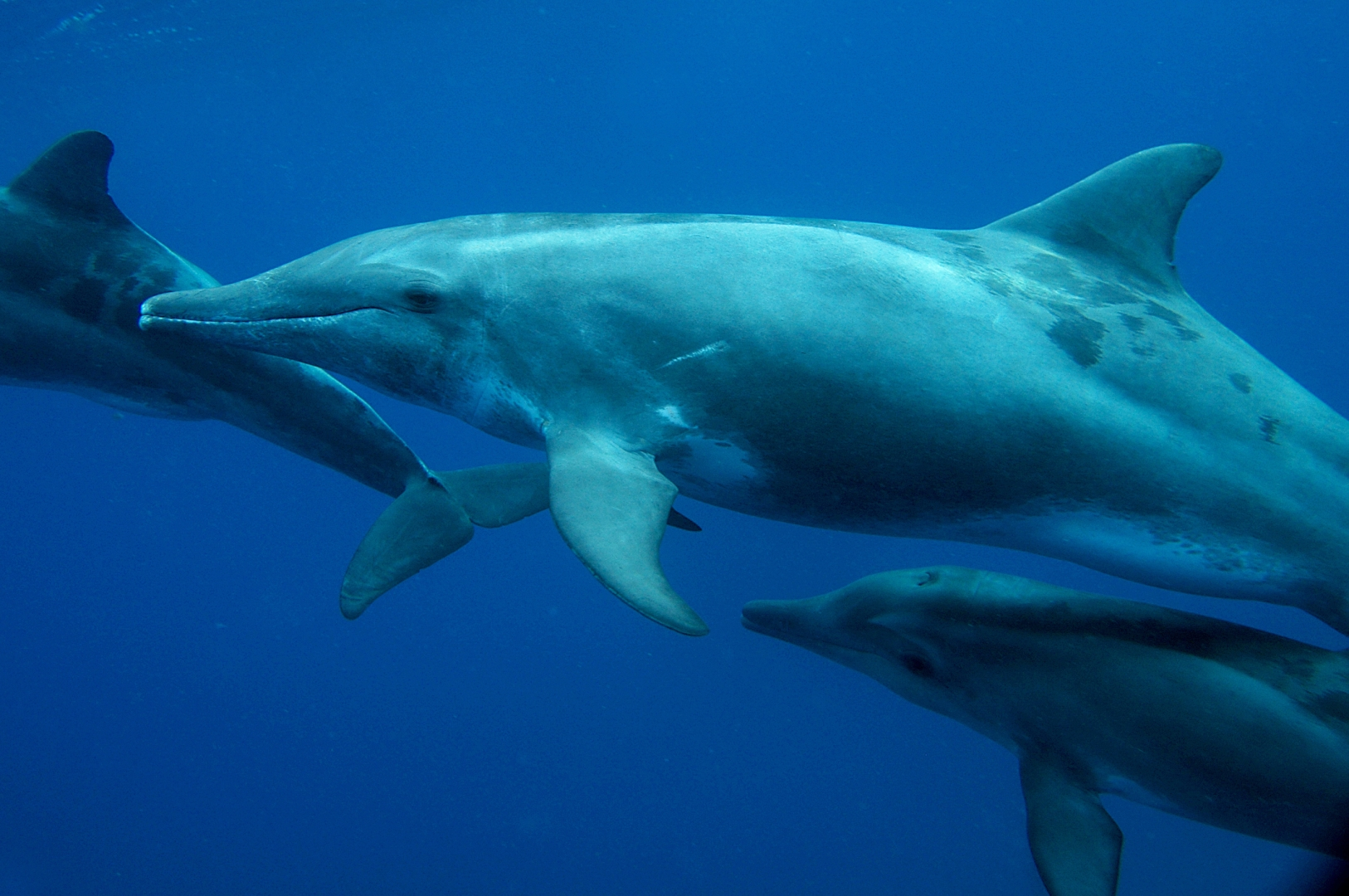
Rough-toothed dolphin in Guadeloupe

The rough-toothed dolphin is observed in all the world's warm waters, between 40°N and 35°S, in a wide variety of habitats. Its populations have well-defined structures. For example, the populations West and East of Florida seem to be separate. In the North of the Gulf of Mexico most of the sightings have been recorded in the oceanic environment, with a few cases on the continental shelf.

The rough-toothed dolphin has also been observed in the Caribbean Sea, for example around Aruba, off Honduras or off Colombia.

====== Pygmy (or dwarf) killer whale (Feresa attenuata) ======
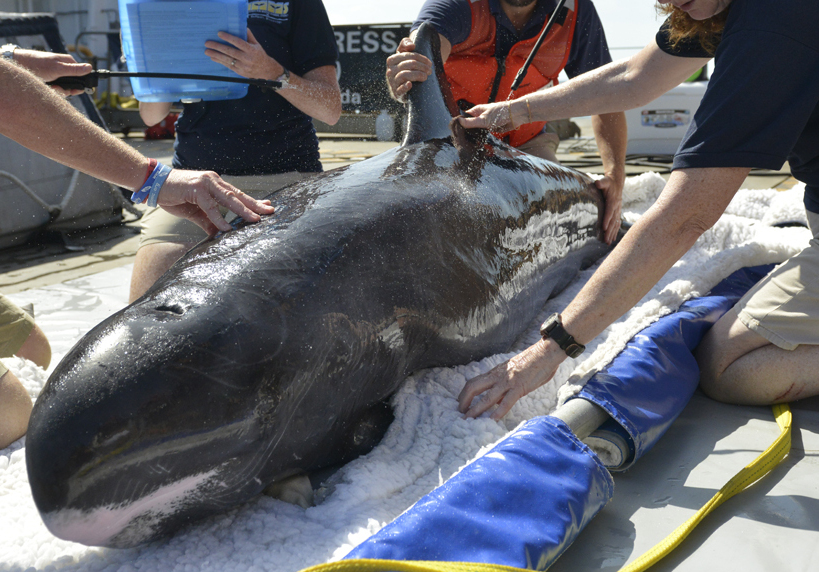
Pygmy killer whale stranded in the Gulf of Mexico

Few sightings of pygmy killer whales have been recorded in the Caribbean. One was captured at Saint Vincent in 1969 and a mass stranding occurred in the British Virgin Islands in 1995.

====== Short-finned pilot whale (Globicephala macrorhynchus) ======
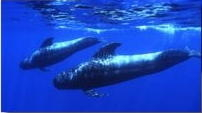
Short-finned pilot whales in the Caribbean

In the water it is difficult to distinguish between the short- and long-finned pilot whales, but morphological genetic analyses show characteristic differences. Their distributions overlap in the North of the Caribbean region, along the American coast, but only the short-finned pilot whale is observed in the Caribbean region, the long-finned species preferring to avoid warm waters. However, some strandings of long-finned pilot whales have been observed in Florida.

The short-finned pilot whale is found throughout the Caribbean and along the continental shelf and slope of the Gulf of Mexico. It is apparently the most common cetacean species around Puerto Rico and the Virgin Islands.

====== Risso's dolphin (Grampus griseus) ======
Risso's dolphin is found in the three major oceans, in temperate and tropical waters, mainly on the continental slope. Higher concentrations are observed on the continental slope of the Gulf of Mexico, although its distribution is worldwide in all oceans. Similarly, in the North-East Atlantic it is observed along the slope and moves further offshore in the winter.

Sightings have been reported off Aruba, French Guiana, Venezuela and Mexico but do not appear to be common in the region.

====== Melon-headed whale (Peponocephala electra) ======
The melon-headed whale is distributed worldwide in tropical and subtropical waters.

The rare sightings in the Gulf of Mexico have been in relatively deep waters at depths greater than 800 m. Sightings are also rather rare in the rest of the Caribbean, East or West, and consequently little is known about its distribution.

==== Iniidae ====
===== Amazon river dolphin (Inia geoffrensis) =====
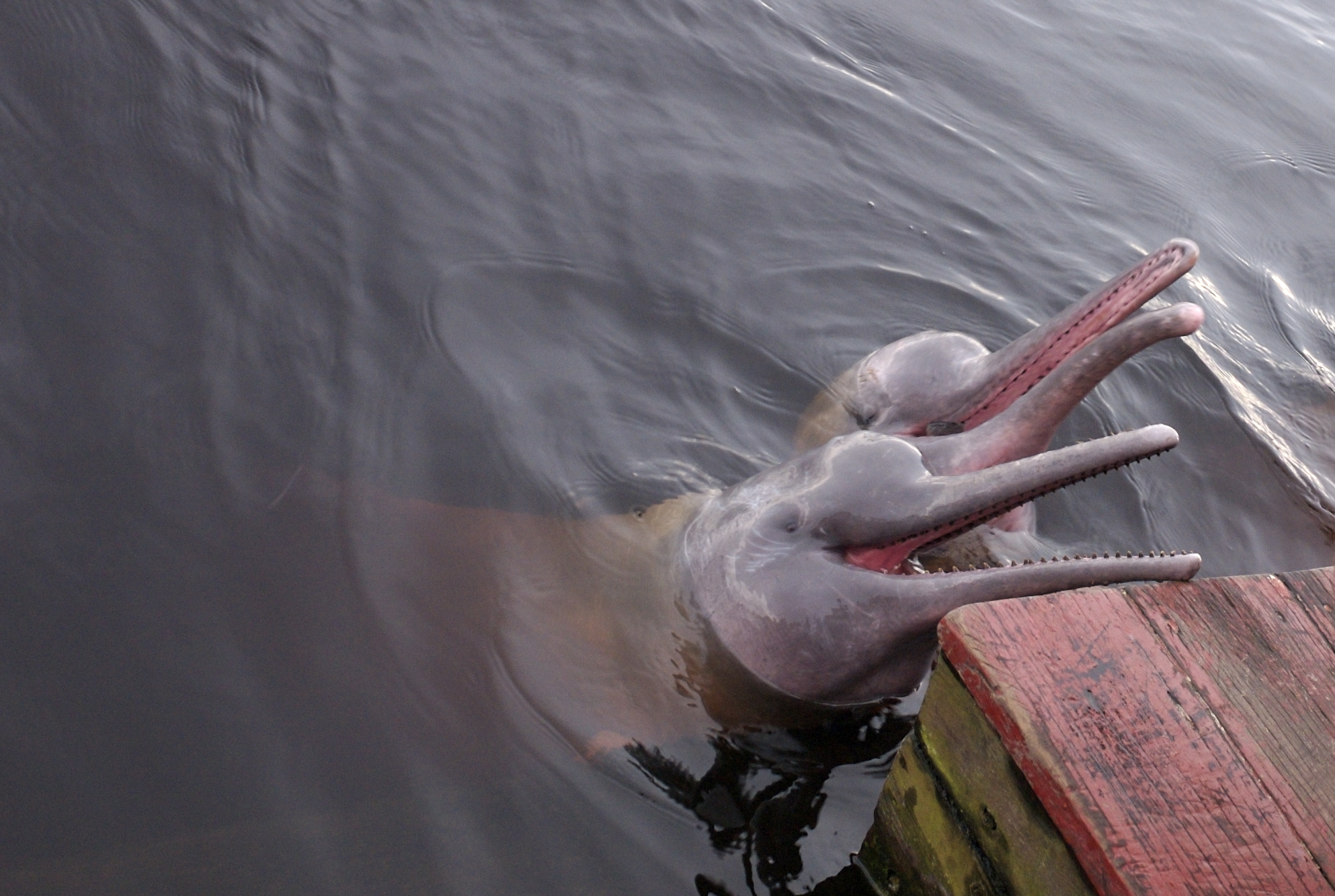
Boto

The genus Iniidae has only one species, the freshwater Amazon river dolphin, also known as the boto. It lives in the Amazon and Orinoco river basins in Brazil, Colombia and Venezuela, but also, outside the Caribbean region, further West in Ecuador, Bolivia and Peru. Its distribution extends from the estuaries to far upstream, where it is blocked by currents or waterfalls.

==== Physeteridae and Kogiidae (sperm whales) ====
===== Sperm whale (Physeter macrocephalus) =====
The sperm whale, or cachalot, is a cosmopolitan species, often sighted close to continental shelves and canyons.

The population in the Lesser Antilles is one of the most closely studied in the world, and comprises several social units (mainly females and their young), travelling between several islands; most of these units are declining. The Caribbean arc population(s) appear(s) to be divided into three vocal clans sharing a common vocal repertoire.

Sperm whales are the most common large cetaceans in the Gulf of Mexico, where their movements are determined by the areas of high and low atmospheric pressure. At least one population appears to be resident in the Gulf.

===== Dwarf sperm whale (Kogia sima) =====
The dwarf sperm whale, the morphology of which closely resembles that of the pygmy sperm whale (Kogia breviceps), is found in tropical and temperate waters worldwide, apparently preferring rather warmer waters than Kogia breviceps.

Although the species is rarely seen, spending most of its time in open sea, sightings have been reported along the Florida coast, in the Gulf of Mexico, and in the Caribbean arc. Strandings have been reported in the South and West of the Caribbean basin, in Costa Rica (2006), Honduras (2011), Aruba, Curaçao and Colombia (2008). Insufficient information is available to determine population sizes, let alone their trends.

===== Pygmy sperm whale (Kogia breviceps) =====
Like the other Kogia species, the pygmy sperm whale is cosmopolitan, with sightings reported along the entire Western Atlantic seaboard, from Argentina to Canada. It also lives in deep waters, and its behaviour is such that it is rarely sighted at the surface.

Many stranded individuals were reported in the second half of the 20th century, particularly in Colombia, Puerto Rico, the United States Virgin Islands and Mexico, at any time of the year, suggesting a continuous presence in the Caribbean basin despite the absence of sightings at sea. No sightings have been reported in the waters of the Dutch Caribbean, suggesting a lack of sightings rather than an absence of the species.

In the North of the Gulf of Mexico (EEZ of the United States), the estimated number of the two species combined was 336 individuals in 2017/2018.

==== Ziphiidae (beaked whales) ====
The beaked whales sighted in the region include Cuvier's beaked whale (or goose-beaked whale) and four species of mesoplodont whales which are often difficult to identify at species level. As differentiating between the species of mesoplodont whales at sea is very difficult, offshore sighting data are often grouped under Mesoplodon sp. Blainville's and Gervais' beaked whales are the only two mesoplodont whales with a confirmed continuous presence in the region; the other two species are extralimital cases. A hydrophone recording of an unknown mesoplodont whale has been obtained in the Gulf of Mexico.

===== Cuvier's beaked whale (Ziphius cavirostris) =====
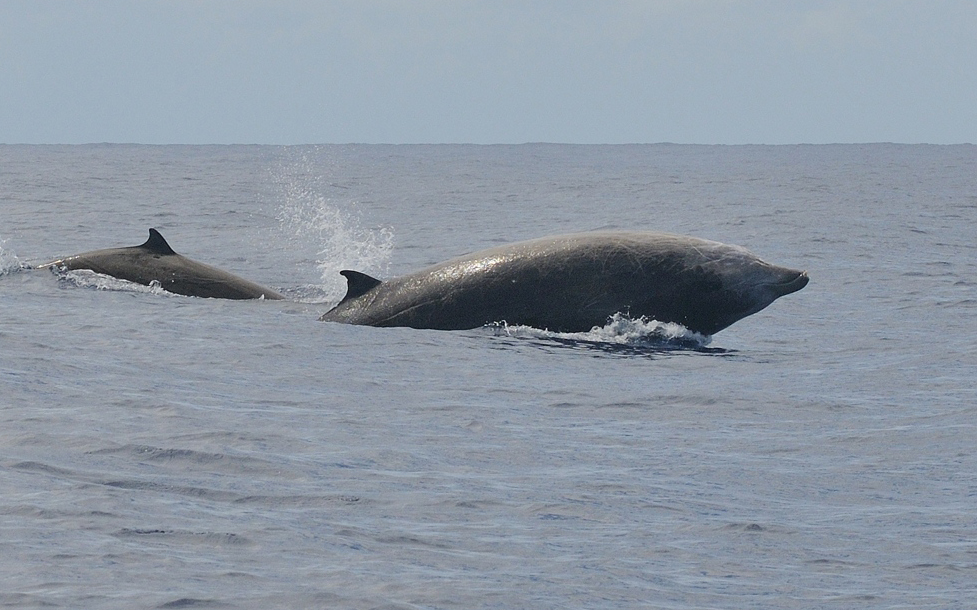
Cuvier's beaked whale in Dominica

Cuvier's beaked whale, or goose-beaked whale, is the most common and abundant species of beaked whale. It is sighted in all the oceans, from the tropics to the polar regions, excluding shallow waters and very high latitudes.

In the North-East Atlantic Ocean, it is sighted mainly along the edge of the continental shelf and, in the Gulf of Mexico, in areas where the depth is greater than 1000 m.

Studies on some populations suggest that Cuvier's beaked whale appears to travel relatively limited distances and have a strong fidelity to a particular region, suggesting a relatively strong social structure.

The species has been recorded making the longest dive ever documented for any mammal, rendering its detection and the estimation of its abundance very difficult. Its distribution is known mainly through strandings. It is also one of the cetacean species most frequently found stranded in the North-Eastern Caribbean.

Sightings have been reported off Cuba, Dominican Republic, Saint Martin, Dominica, Martinique, Saint Vincent, Barbados, Venezuela, Colombia, the Dutch Leeward Islands and Puerto Rico.

===== Blainville's beaked whale (Mesoplodon densirostris) =====
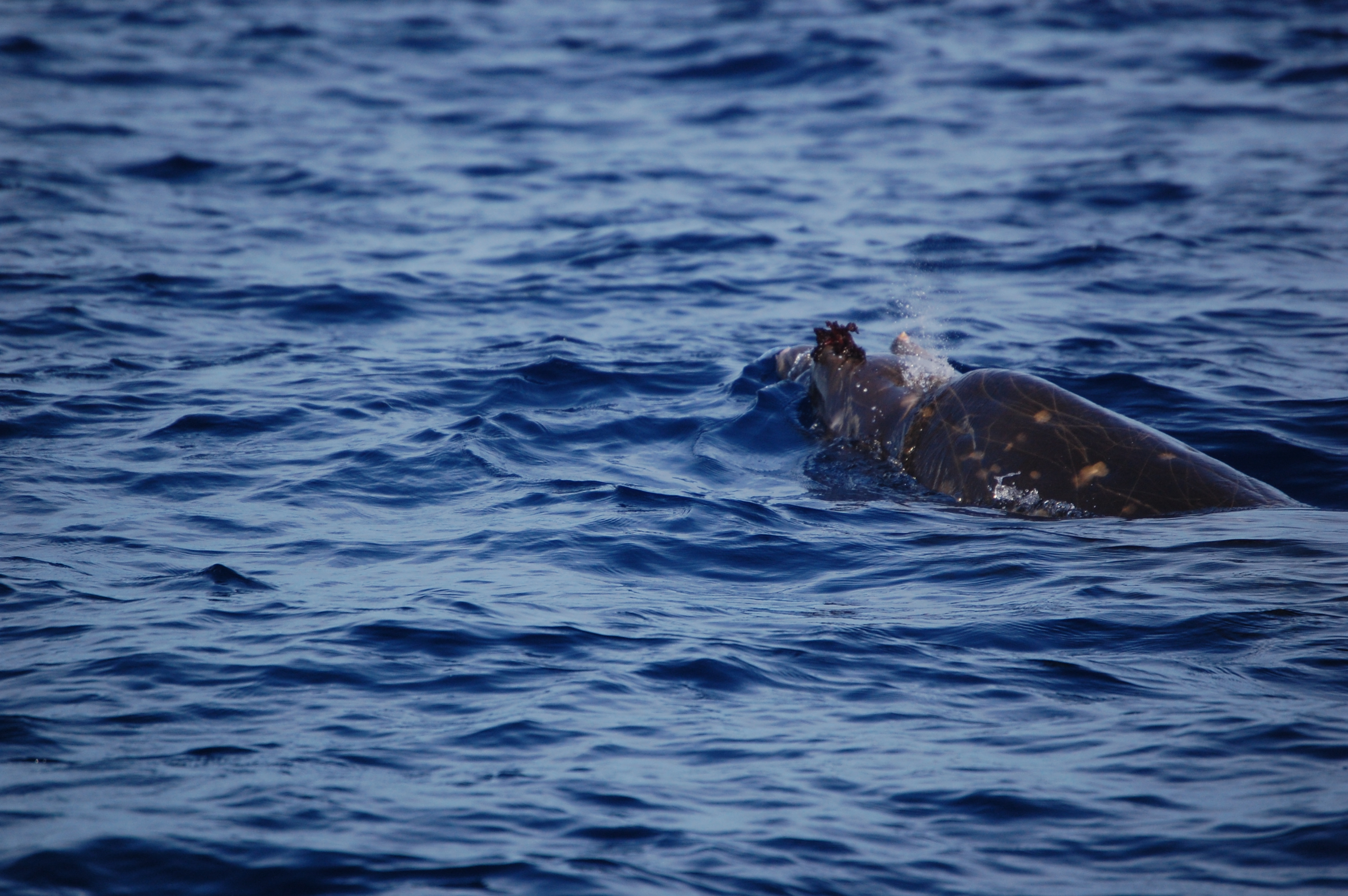
A Blainville's beaked whale off the Bahamas

Blainville's beaked whale appears to have the widest distribution of any mesoplodont whale species, and is found in temperate to tropical waters in all oceans. It mainly inhabits deep waters, but can also be sighted near the coast, in particular around islands and on the margins of continental shelves. It prefers steep zones where it can feed both in the deep scattering layer and at the bottom.

Strandings have been reported in the Cayman Islands, Puerto Rico and the Bahamas.

===== Gervais' beaked whale (Mesoplodon europaeus) =====
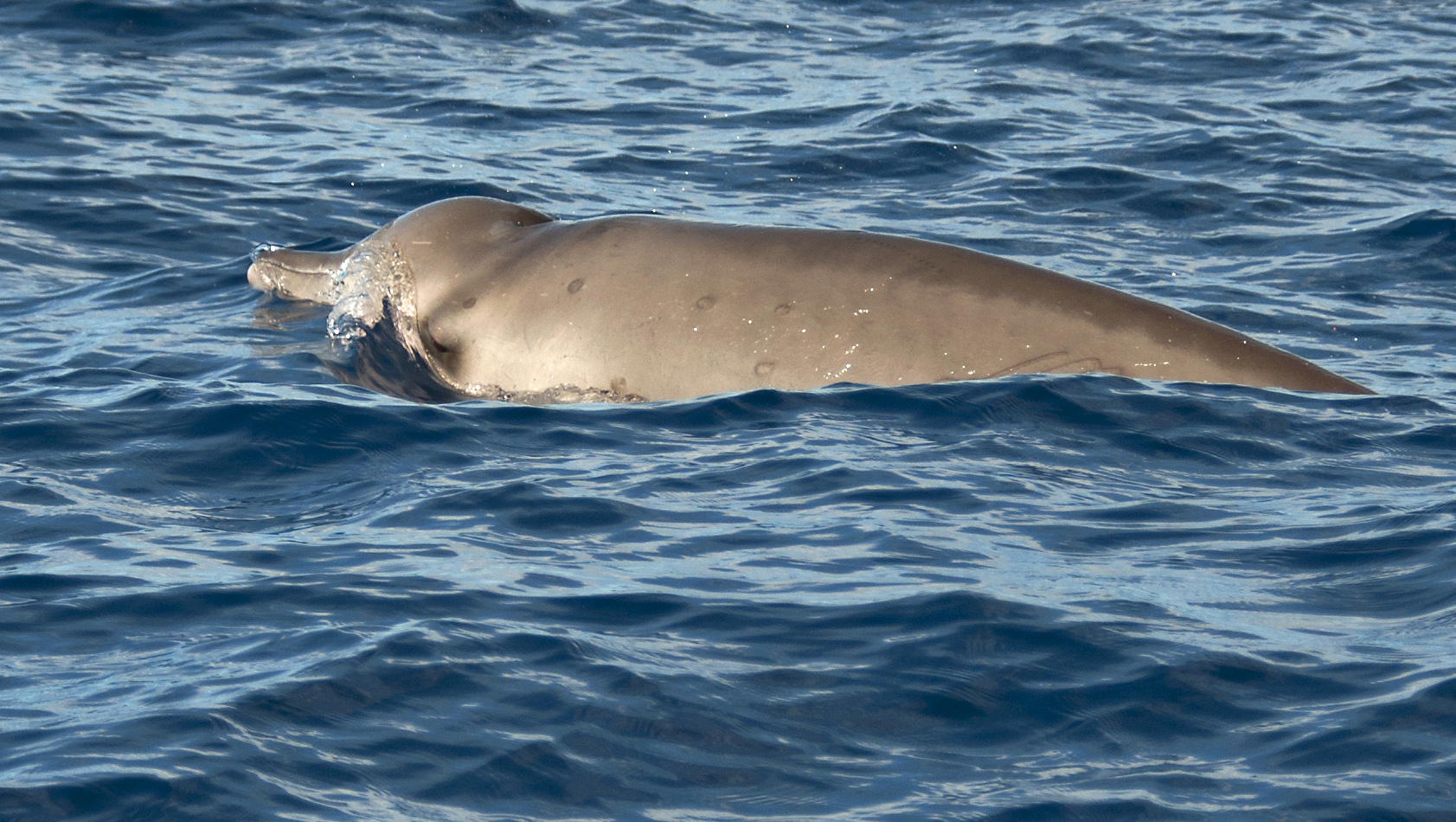
Gervais' beaked whale in Guadeloupe

Given the difficulty in differentiating between the mesoplodont whales visually at sea, the majority of the sightings are recorded simply as mesoplodon sp. Strandings have been reported in Trinidad, Jamaica, Cuba, Dominican Republic, on Curaçao, on Bonaire in the Virgin Islands and on Martinique.

===== True's beaked whale (Mesoplodon mirus) =====
This North Atlantic species lives predominantly on the margin of the continental shelf and further offshore, mainly in temperate waters, down as far as Florida and the Bahamas. A stranding of this species occurred in the Bahamas in 1981.

===== Sowerby's beaked whale (Mesoplodon bidens) =====
This species is at the limit of its distribution in the Wider Caribbean Region, preferring the cold waters of the North Atlantic. A single stranding occurred in 1984 on the coast of Florida in the Gulf of Mexico but this was apparently a lost individual.

== Other marine mammals ==
Other marine mammal species, not belonging to the infra-order of the cetaceans, can be sighted in the Wider Caribbean region:

- the West Indian manatee, divided into two subspecies
  - the Caribbean manatee (Trichechus manatus manatus): manatee subspecies living between Florida and the Guiana Shield, where it hybridises with the Amazonian manatee (Trichechus inunguis). It has been extinct in all the Lesser Antilles for at least a century, although travelling individuals pass through the Leeward Islands
  - the Florida manatee (Trichechus manatus latirostris): subspecies living only in North America and studied particularly closely;
- the West Indian monk seal (Monachus tropicalis): observed for the last time in 1952, the species is officially considered extinct since 1986 by the IUCN. A few sightings in the Caribbean seem to be attributable to young hooded seals (Cystophora cristata), lost far from their area of distribution.
- the California sea lion (Zalophus californianus): this species is not native to the Caribbean, but was introduced in the 1950s and 1960s.

== Threats ==
Between 2010 and 2014, the LifeWeb project conducted a cross-sector analysis of the threats to marine mammals in the Caribbean, based on several maps of pollution, coastal development, maritime traffic and fishing. In 2020, as part of the CARI'MAM (Caribbean mammals preservation network) project funded by Interreg Caribbean, the SPAW-RAC produced an analysis of the 2012 action plan for the marine mammals of the region. It shows how the management measures taken by the countries have evolved over 8 years and lists the threats by territory.

=== Interaction with fishing ===
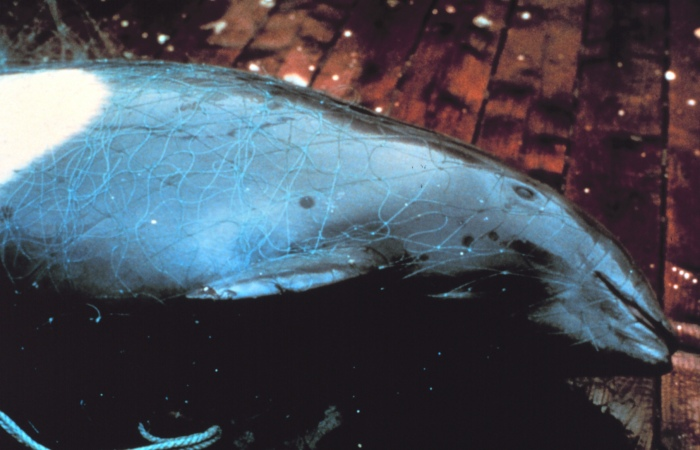
Cetaceans in fishing net in the Pacific Ocean

Marine mammals can be caught in fishing gear and be drowned, injured or hoisted in the nets as bycatch. In the Caribbean, where fishing is mainly small-scale, little information on bycatch is available, and the main institutions concerned take little or no account of this issue in their analyses and strategies. However, entanglement has been observed, for example of sperm whales in the cables of fish aggregating devices or of dolphins in gill nets.

The overexploitation of many fish stocks in the region may also have an impact on the maintenance of the cetacean populations that feed on them.

Beyond the negative interactions between fishers and marine mammals, several species of marine mammals are targeted directly by hunters in the Caribbean, legally or illegally. None of these catches are monitored or reported as required by the SPAW protocol. Because of the lack of data, the impact of these hunts on the populations remains unknown. Various species are hunted, including killer whales, pilot whales, stenella, humpback whales (at Bequia only) and manatees .

=== Habitat degradation ===
Coastal urbanisation is progressing rapidly in the whole of the region, including cruise terminals, ports and seaside resorts. These developments are accompanied by issues of chemical pollution (untreated wastewater, hydrocarbons in the ports, etc.) and noise pollution. Marine mammals are rarely taken into account in the pre-works impact assessment, in contrast to corals and other coastal benthic species. In some regions of the Caribbean, the development of oilfields contributes to this problem, either directly by drilling wells or by the maritime traffic generated and the installations required by the oil industry.

=== Pollution ===
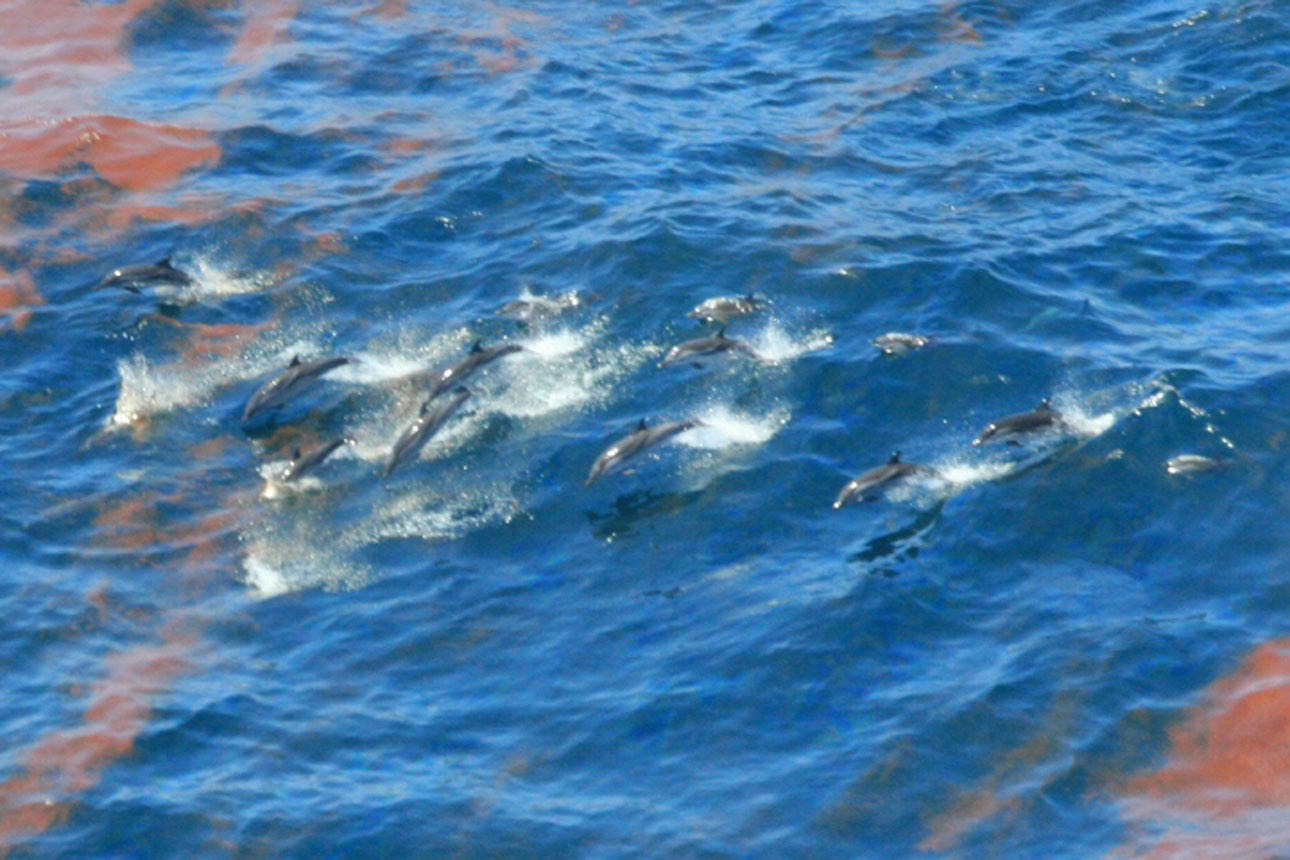
Striped dolphins in the Deepwater Horizon oil spill

Pollution of terrestrial origin includes the eutrophication of coastal waters by nutrient runoff along watercourses and by soil leaching. The Caribbean islands, other than in local cases, are not greatly affected by this problem, but algal blooms have been recorded, particularly in Florida, causing unusual mortality events among bottlenose dolphins.

The oil industry is expanding rapidly in the region and several oil spills have already been observed. The largest oil disaster in the United States, the Deepwater Horizon oil rig explosion, is having long-term impacts on the cetacean populations of the Gulf of Mexico .

Heavy metals such as mercury accumulate up the food chain. Cetaceans, generally at the top of the food chain, are the principal animals affected. The mercury is a by-product of gold washing in the Amazon basin. Mercury and selenium have been detected in several cetacean species hunted off Saint Vincent for food.

The region also experiences high levels of pollution by waste, particularly plastics, which can be ingested by marine mammals or within which they can become entangled.

=== Whale watching ===
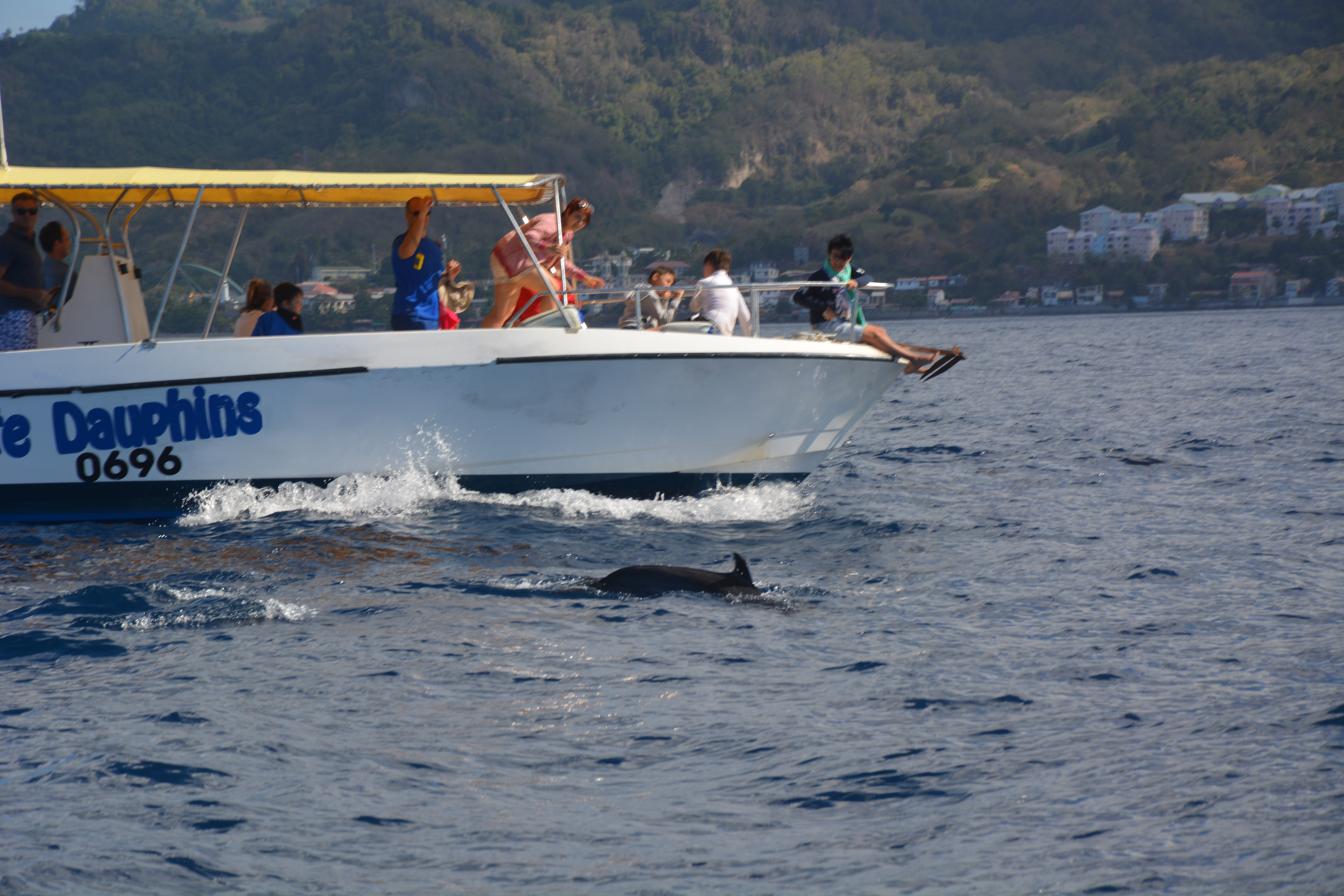
Dolphin watching in Martinique

Recreational observation of marine mammals, generally referred to as whale watching, began at least 50 years ago in the Caribbean, and has since shown continuous growth. In Dominica, the activity generates around 3 million dollars of profit while in the French West Indies the estimated profit was more than 2 million euros in 2015. Although the practice can support the economic development of certain territories, while playing an important awareness-raising role, it can also be highly damaging for the whales if it is poorly implemented or too intensive. There is a good practice guide backed by the SPAW Protocol.

=== Lack of knowledge ===
There are relatively few programmes for acquiring knowledge about marine mammals in the Caribbean region, and the existing data are scattered. The majority of the monitoring programmes are carried out by associations with few links between them, leading to scattering of the results and difficulty in conducting overall analyses. Lack of knowledge about the distribution of species and the estimation of their abundance is a major problem in their conservation. The LifeWeb project, completed in 2014, provided an initial analysis of the distribution of the species by cross-referencing the various available data sources in the form of an interactive map. A 2021 study in Guadeloupe has attempted to bring together several data sets from various sources to reduce this disparity of information.

Marine mammal strandings in the region can be a major source of information on the threats against these animals and on the species distributions. However, the information potential of these events is generally under-used.

=== Captivity ===
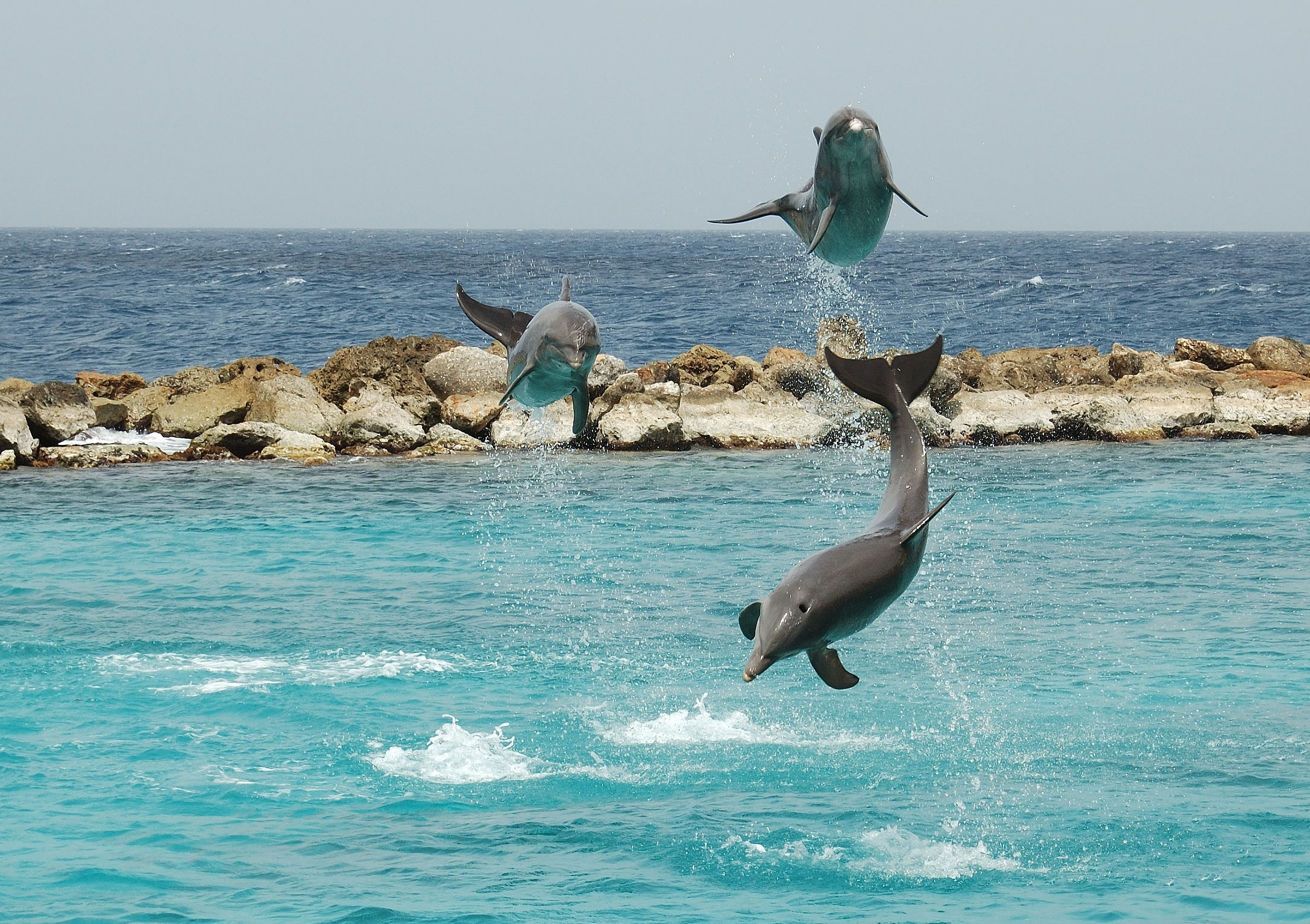
Bottlenose dolphins in captivity in Curaçao

There are more than 50 leisure facilities in which marine mammals are held captive in the Caribbean, either in sea pens or in pools. Beyond the issue of the well-being of the animals in captivity in dolphinariums, several countries capture wild animals to perform in these establishments. Cuba for example, regularly exports bottlenose dolphins to several countries. They are the most common species in captivity.

=== Noise pollution ===
Noise pollution has a strong impact on the various marine mammal species, as they depend on sound for major aspects of their life, such as communication and location . Noise pollution in the region is generated by seismic surveys related to oil exploration, military sonars, and maritime traffic. Although strandings linked with noise pollution have been documented, there is a lack of knowledge on the pollution level in the region, and a lack of regional directives on attenuating the effects of seismic surveys.

=== Collisions ===
Maritime traffic along the major sea lanes in the Caribbean can lead to collisions with the large cetaceans, and at the same time increase noise pollution in the marine environment. However, the number of collisions recorded is low, no doubt because the information is not reported. Although the sea routes are known, knowledge of the risk areas for animals is inadequate and/or based on extrapolations. Small cetaceans and manatees can also be involved in collisions with small boats (fishing boats or recreational boats) or injured by their propellers

=== Climate change ===
The impact of climate change on marine mammals is difficult to predict, all the more so in tropical environments. Populations of small cetaceans living close to the coasts, in small areas, will have the greatest difficulty adapting. Potential threats to marine mammals include heat stress, algal blooms, reduction of the flow of rivers resulting in concentration of pollutants, reduction of fish stocks and destruction of certain key habitats such as coral reefs.

== Management ==
=== International regulations ===
At global level, the member countries of the International Whaling Commission have ratified a moratorium banning the hunting of certain cetacean species. The moratorium only concerns commercial whaling; subsistence whaling and 'scientific' whaling are subject to waiver and quota. In the Caribbean, Saint Vincent and the Grenadines (Bequia island) have a waiver for aboriginal subsistence whaling concerning the humpback whale. They are allowed to kill 28 individuals between 2019 and 2025. The mammal trade is also covered by the CITES convention.

At regional level, the signatory countries of the SPAW Protocol of the Cartagena Convention undertake to provide total protection of the marine mammals on their territory. All these species are listed in annex II of the protocol on Specially Protected Areas and Wildlife (SPAW) of the Cartagena Convention. This means that for the 17 Parties to the protocol, any form of destruction or disturbance is prohibited, possession or commercial trading of the species are also banned, as are products derived from these species. Any human activity having an adverse impact on their habitat is supposed to be regulated. However, the protocol makes provision for exemptions to be requested for scientific, educational or management purposes necessary for the survival of a species. An action plan for the mammals was adopted by the parties to the protocol in 2008.

In 2014 the LifeWeb project put forward various scenarios to reinforce the protection of marine mammals at regional level, such as the establishment of three Particularly Sensitive Sea Areas (PSSA): North of the Dominican Republic and North of Puerto Rico; at the Virgin Islands channel West of Saint Thomas; and North-West of Saint Lucia, along Martinique and Dominica and South of Guadeloupe.

=== National regulations ===
In 2020, a study on the national legislation of each country was conducted by SPAW-RAC as part of the CARI'MAM project. The study listed the national regulations specific to marine mammals by country (which does not preclude general and global legislation on the environment, fishing or biodiversity including marine mammals). Additional information on the national regulations can be found in the analysis of the 2012 action plan for marine mammals.

Country	Specific regulations
Antigua and Barbuda	
Bahamas	Bahamas Marine Mammal Protection Act, came into effect in 2006 and was updated in 2010
Barbados	No specific regulations
Belize	Act on fishery resources (2020) ruling on full protection of marine mammals.
Colombia	Political Constitution (1991) establishing the obligations of the Colombian State regarding the protection of natural resources and more specifically of the diversity and the integrity of the environment, guaranteeing the participation of communities in the decision-making process.; Laws on the protection of wildlife and ecosystems: decree-law 2811 (1974) setting out the National renewable natural resources and environmental protection code.; Decree 1681 (1978) regulating the conservation and utilisation of hydrobiological resources
Costa Rica	
Cuba	No specific regulations concerning marine mammals, but there is a regulation for the monitoring and protection of biological diversity of particular interest, including all cetaceans and manatees.
Dominica	
Dominican Republic	General act on the environment and on natural resources (Act 64 of 2000); Sectoral act on protected areas (Act 202 of 2004); General act on biodiversity (Act 333 of 2015)
France	Ministerial order establishing the list of protected marine mammals on French territory and the procedures for their protection (2011)
Grenada	No specific regulations
Guiana	No specific regulations
Haiti	
Honduras	No specific regulations, but has a general wildlife and ecosystems protection system which includes marine mammals.
Jamaica	
Panama	Act establishing the marine corridor for the protection and conservation of marine mammals in the waters under national jurisdiction (2005).; Resolution 0530-2017 of the Protocol on the observation of cetaceans in the waters under national jurisdiction.; Executive decree 6-A on measures to reduce marine mammal injuries during fishing activities.
Mexico	Federal criminal code (2020 version in effect): article 420 of the General Act on ecological equilibrium and environmental protection (2019 version in effect) and article 20a. 6, Art. 28, Art. 51, Art. 131 and Art. 132 on marine ecosystems including aquatic fauna and flora.; General Act on wildlife (2020 version in effect): article 55a (2010 version in effect) and Art. 60a.; Protocol for monitoring marine mammal strandings (2014).; Decrees establishing protected natural areas.; Agreements on the management plans of protected natural areas.
Montserrat	No specific regulations, but has a general wildlife and ecosystems protection system which includes marine mammals.
Nicaragua	
Netherlands	Decree of 2010 on BES (Bonaire, St Eustatius, Saba) fishing.; Act of 2010 on BES Nature (referring to the species under sections f, g, h and i of the SPAW protocol).; Nature conservation framework.
St Lucia	No specific regulations
Saint Vincent and the Grenadines	Aboriginal subsistence whaling regulations (2003).
Trinidad and Tobago	No specific regulations, but has a general wildlife and ecosystems protection system which includes marine mammals.
Turks and Caicos Islands	Fishery protection order (2018 version in effect).
United States of America	Marine Mammal Protection Act.; Endangered Species Act.; Animal Welfare Act.; Dolphin Protection Consumer Information Act
Venezuela	No specific regulations, but exploitation of a species prohibited as long as no exploitation programme has been launched. In theory this excludes exploitation of marine mammals
British Virgin Islands	

=== Sanctuaries for marine mammals ===
Several countries have designated all or part of their exclusive economic zone as a sanctuary for marine mammals. In practice, these marine protected areas are dedicated to the conservation of these species, although marine mammals are in many cases already covered by national conservation measures. Since the beginning of the 21st century, these large marine protected areas have signed cooperation agreements, encouraged by the NOAA Sister Sanctuaries programme.

Other than these few large sanctuaries, the 74 protected areas identified by the LifeWeb project in 2014 are inadequate for effective protection of marine mammals, except those living very close to the coasts. In 2020, an analysis of the management plans of the Caribbean marine protected areas, carried out as part of the CARI'MAM (Caribbean Marine Mammals Preservation network) project, showed that the planning documents for these coastal sites took little account of marine mammals.

The LifeWeb project accompanied its analysis with recommendations, including the establishment of a network of marine protected areas. Previously, between 2011 and 2014, the MamaCocoSea (Marine Mammal Conservation Corridor for Northern South America) project had already initiated cooperation between professionals working on marine mammals in the North-East of Latin America. Between 2018 and 2021, the CARI'MAM project worked to reinforce the network of partners across the entire Caribbean. In April 2021, the scientific and technical committee of the SPAW protocol asked the secretariat to consider organising a regional activity network based on the results of the project.

==== Agoa Sanctuary ====
The Agoa Sanctuary comprises the 143,256 km^{2} (55,311 sq mi) of the French exclusive economic zone in the West Indies, which includes the waters of Martinique, Guadeloupe, Saint Martin and Saint Barthélemy. It was established in 2010 and recognised under the SPAW protocol of the Cartagena Convention in 2012, with the objective of ensuring "a favorable conservation status for marine mammals by protecting them and their habitats from the direct or indirect, proven or potential negative impacts deriving from human activities".

==== Yarari Sanctuary ====
The Yarari Sanctuary was established in 2015 around the Dutch islands Saba and Bonaire. In 2018 it was enlarged to include the waters around Sint Eustatius. The exclusive economic zones of these three islands forming the Dutch Caribbean together constitute a 25,390 km^{2} sanctuary dedicated to the conservation of marine mammals and sharks.

==== Silver Bank and Navidad Bank Sanctuary ====
The Banco de la Plata y la Navidad is a marine protected area established in the Dominican Republic by decree no. 319 of 14 October 1986 and amended by Act no. 202 on protected areas, increasing the area to 32,879.8 km^{2} (12,695.0 sq mi). The area is known to be a major breeding site in the Caribbean for humpback whales. An estimated 2000 to 3000 individuals spend the northern winter here each year.

==== Bermuda Marine Mammal Sanctuary ====
In September 2012, the whole of the exclusive economic zone of the Bermuda archipelago, more than 1,000 km (620 mi) north of the Caribbean region, was designated a sanctuary for marine mammals, with an area of more than 583,083 km^{2} (225,130 sq mi). This designation was intended above all to reinforce the protection of humpback whales, already protected by two other national legislative texts, and the cooperation with other national sanctuaries such as the Stellwagen Bank National Marine Sanctuary in Massachusetts Bay.

== See also ==
- List of cetaceans
- Mediterranean cetaceans
