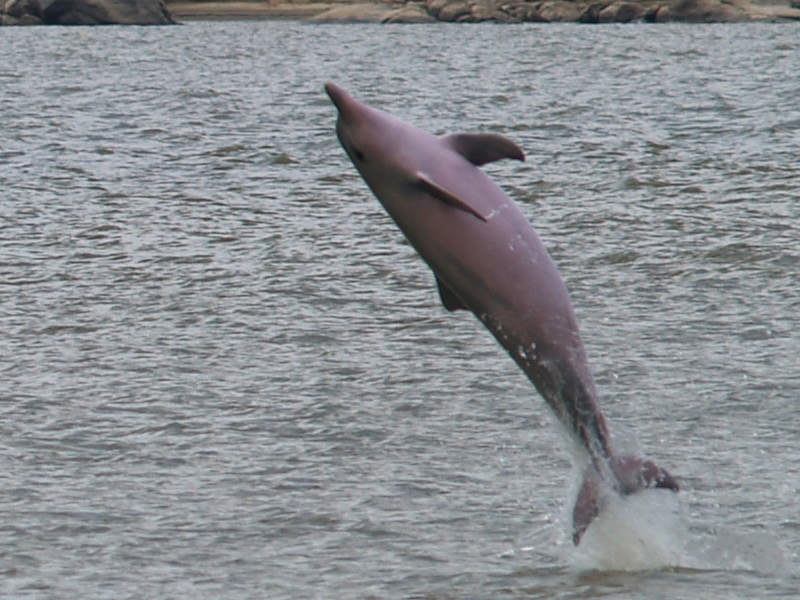
- Jumping Sotalia in the Orinoco river

Scientific classification
- Domain: Eukaryota
- Kingdom: Animalia
- Phylum: Chordata
- Class: Mammalia
- Order: Artiodactyla
- Infraorder: Cetacea
- Family: Delphinidae
- Subfamily: Stenoninae
- Genus: Sotalia; Gray, 1866

Type species
- Delphinus guianensis Van Beneden, 1864

Species
- S. fluviatilis S. guianensis
- Native range of Sotalita sp.

= Sotalia =

Genus of mammals

The dolphin genus Sotalia is considered to have two member species with the classification of Sotalia guianensis as a distinct species from Sotalia fluviatilis in 2007. This was a result of recent morphometric analyses, as well as mitochondrial DNA analysis.

Members of this genus are found in the Atlantic and Caribbean coasts of Central and South America as well as in the Amazon River and most of its tributaries.

== Member species ==
- Sotalia fluviatilis (Gervais & Deville, 1853), Tucuxi
- Sotalia guianensis (van Bénéden, 1864), Costero or Guiana dolphin
