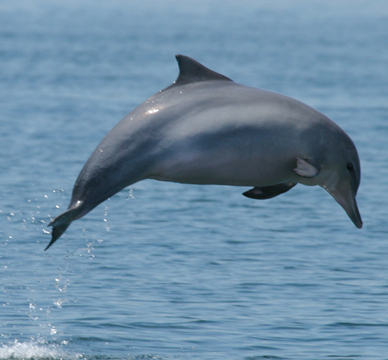
- Guiana dolphin
- Size compared to an average human

Conservation status
- Near Threatened (IUCN 3.1)
- CITES Appendix I

Scientific classification
- Kingdom: Animalia
- Phylum: Chordata
- Class: Mammalia
- Infraclass: Placentalia
- Order: Artiodactyla
- Infraorder: Cetacea
- Family: Delphinidae
- Genus: Sotalia
- Species: S. guianensis

Binomial name
- Sotalia guianensis (van Bénéden, 1864)
- Range of Guiana dolphin

= Guiana dolphin =

Species of mammal

Sound of Sotalia guianensis

The Guiana dolphin (Sotalia guianensis), also known as the estuarine dolphin or costero, is a dolphin found in the coastal and estuary waters to the north and east of South America, and east of Central America. It is a member of the oceanic dolphin family (Delphinidae).

== English name ==
During its 2008 Annual Meeting in Santiago, Chile, as proposed by Flores et al. (2008), the Scientific Committee of the International Whaling Commission (IWC) endorsed "Guiana dolphin" as the common English name for Sotalia guianensis in its IWC List of Recognized Cetacean Species (LRCS). Following this endorsement, Flores and colleagues also made the case for the adoption of the English name in the Latin American Journal of Aquatic Mammals.

== Description ==
The Guiana dolphin is frequently described as similar to the bottlenose dolphin in appearance, but it is typically smaller, at only up to 2.1 m (6.9 ft) in length. Individuals are light to bluish grey in coloration on their back and sides. The ventral region is light grey. The dorsal fin is typically slightly hooked, with a triangular shape. The beak is well-defined and of moderate length.

The Guiana dolphin is very similar in appearance to the closely related tucuxi (Sotalia fluviatilis) with most differences only apparent in skull shape and body size. The Guiana dolphin is the larger of two at a maximum mass of 121 kilograms versus 53 kilograms for the tucuxi.

Researchers have recently shown that the Guiana dolphin has an electroreceptive sense, and speculate this may also be the case for other odontocetes.

== Taxonomy ==
Although described as species distinct from the tucuxi Sotalia fluviatilis by Pierre-Joseph van Bénéden in 1864, the Guiana dolphin Sotalia guianensis was subsequently synonymized with Sotalia fluviatilis with the two species being treated as subspecies, or marine and freshwater varieties. The first to reassert differences between these two species was a three-dimensional morphometric study of Monteiro-Filho and colleagues. Subsequently, a molecular analysis by Cunha and colleagues unambiguously demonstrated that Sotalia guianensis was genetically differentiated from Sotalia fluviatilis. This finding was reiterated by Caballero and colleagues with a larger number of genes. The existence of two species has been generally accepted by the scientific community.

== Distribution ==
The Guiana dolphin is seen to practice site fidelity with staying in the same area for a long time or returning back to previous sites. In addition to site fidelity the Guiana dolphin is also seen to not travel far to forage and generally stays in the same area. Though seen to practice site fidelity this species is seen to have patterns of movement that correlate with the seasons. The Guiana dolphin is found close to estuaries, inlets and other protected shallow-water areas around the eastern and northern South American coast. It has been reported as far south as southern Brazil and north as far as Nicaragua and possibly Honduras. This species has been observed to tolerate a wide range of temperatures and salinities

== Behaviour ==
Behavior regarding social interaction between individuals is commonly seen for the purpose of foraging and traveling. Group size and behavior in general is seen to differ within the seasons. Along with tending to forage in pods the Guiana Dolphin is also seen to be an opportunistic feeder.

This species generally forms small groups averaging about 2-6 individuals, but does occasionally form larger aggregations of up to several hundred animals. They are quite active and may jump clear of the water (a behaviour known as breaching), somersault, spy-hop or tail-splash. They are unlikely, however, to approach boats.

In December 2006, researchers from the Southern University of Chile and the Rural Federal University of Rio de Janeiro witnessed attempted infanticide by a group of Guiana dolphins in Sepetiba Bay, Brazil. A group of six adults separated a mother from her calf, four then keeping her at bay by ramming her and hitting her with their flukes. The other two adults rammed the calf, held it under water, then threw it into the air and held it under water again. The mother was seen again in a few days, but not her calf. Since females become sexually receptive within a few days of losing a calf, and the group of attacking males were sexually interested in the female, it is possible that the infanticide occurred for this reason. Infanticide has been reported previously in bottlenose dolphins but is thought to be generally uncommon among cetaceans.

== Diet and foraging ==
Guiana dolphins feed mainly on a wide variety of bony fish and occasionally on shrimps, cephalopods, and crabs. Studies of growth layers suggest the species can live more than 40 years. Diet for the Guiana dolphins range dramatically depending on where said dolphins are located at due to their opportunistic feeding habits. Feeding often occurs in more shallow waters where there is a more concentrated amount of prey.

More than 60 species of demersal and pelagic schooling fish have been reported as prey. Small fish of 8 in (20 cm) or less are preferred. Foraging may be carried out individually or in groups. Different dolphin communities may adopt their own foraging strategies based on local circumstances. One of the best studied groups herds fish onto beaches and half strands themselves for a few seconds while grabbing their prey. To capture small prey Guiana Dolphins have been seen fish whacking to disorient and then capture prey. Foraging can also be seen to correlate with others in the community with instances of the Guiana Dolphin and the seabirds participating in multi-species feeding.

== Reproduction ==
A study of a population off the coast of southern Brazil in the late 1990s found that females matured at 5–8 years of age and males where mature at 7 years of age. The gestation period was found to be approximately 12 month gestation period. The Guiana Dolphin is not seen to have a defined breeding season though the reproductive cycle is 2 years long. After age 25, the researchers found that the reproductive cycle had increased to 2.5 years a possible indication of reproductive senescence, or aging. The Guiana dolphin practices polyandry causing correlation to males competing for access to females.

== Conservation ==
The Guiana dolphin is listed on Appendix II of the Convention on the Conservation of Migratory Species of Wild Animals (CMS). It is listed on Appendix II as it has an unfavourable conservation status or would benefit significantly from international co-operation organised by tailored agreements. As with all coastal cetaceans, the Guiana dolphin suffers from negative interactions with humans. Entanglement in gill nets, seine nets, and shrimp traps is responsible for the death of many animals each year. There is very limited gene flow between concentrations of this dolphin, and large stretches of coast contain no animals at all, so recovery from depletion of a local population may take time.

A population decline was noted in Guanabara Bay near Rio de Janeiro with 34 individuals surviving in 2016, down from 70 in 1995 and 400 in 1985. The bays around Rio de Janeiro are known to be polluted with industrial waste and sewage, a possible cause of this population's decline. By 2024 the number in Guanabara Bay was below 30, and while populations in Sepetiba Bay and Ilha Grande Bay to the west are larger, they are thought also to be at risk.

== See also ==
- List of cetaceans
